= 74th British Academy Film Awards =

2021 film award ceremony

- Date: 10–11 April 2021
- Site: Royal Albert Hall, London
- Hosted by: Clara Amfo (Opening Night); Edith Bowman and Dermot O'Leary (Main ceremony)

Highlights
- Best Film: Nomadland
- Best British Film: Promising Young Woman
- Best Actor: Anthony Hopkins; The Father
- Best Actress: Frances McDormand; Nomadland
- Most awards: Nomadland (4)
- Most nominations: Nomadland and Rocks (7)

The 74th British Academy Film Awards, also known as the BAFTAs, were held on 10 and 11 April 2021 at the Royal Albert Hall in London, honouring the best national and foreign films of 2020 and early 2021. Presented by the British Academy of Film and Television Arts, accolades were handed out for the best feature-length film and documentaries of any nationality that were screened at British cinemas in 2020 and early 2021.

The nominees were announced on 9 March 2021. The American drama Nomadland and British coming-of-age drama Rocks received the most nominations with seven each; the former ultimately won four, including Best Film.

== Winners and nominees ==
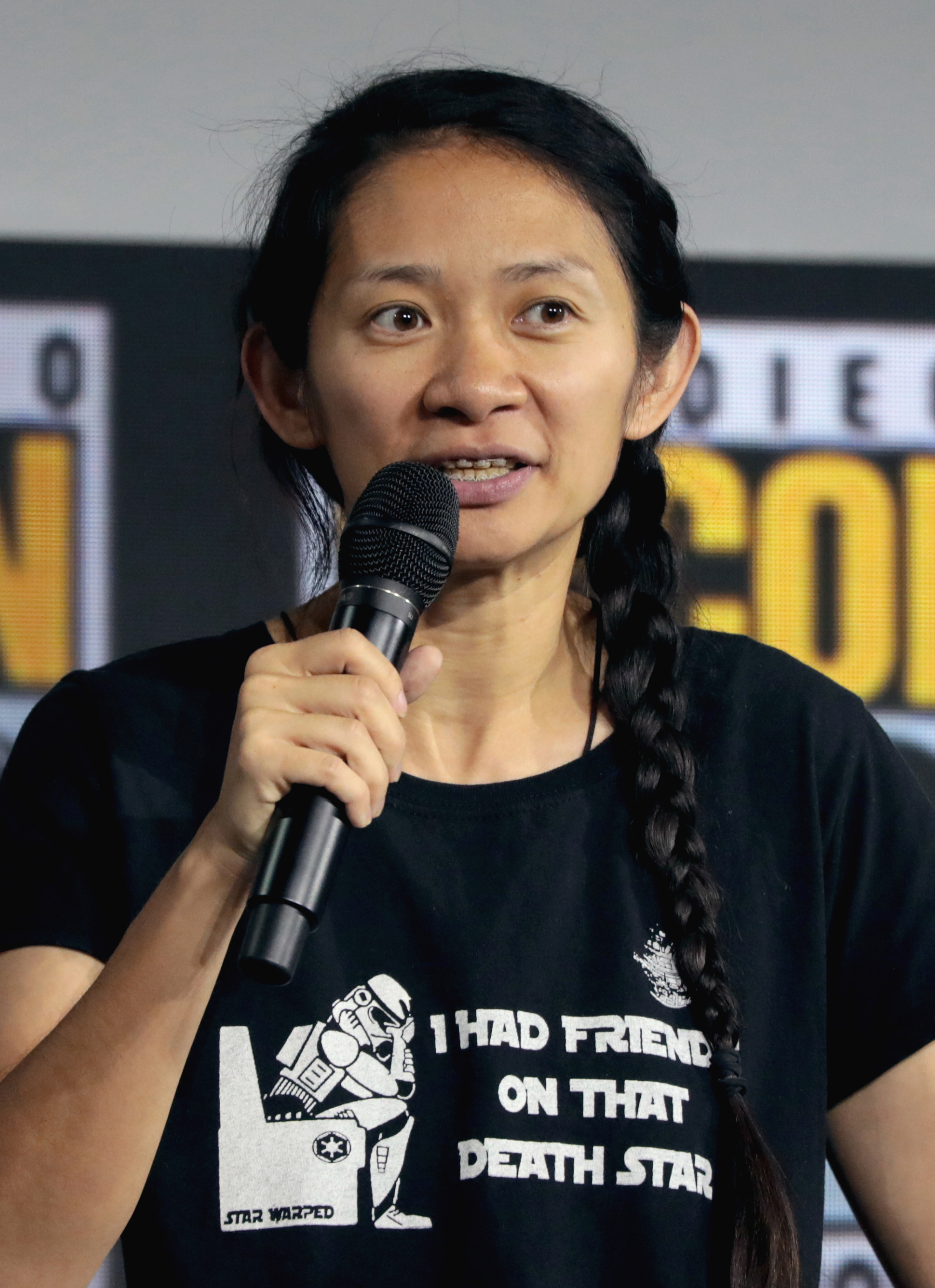
Chloé Zhao, Best Director winner and Best Film co-winner

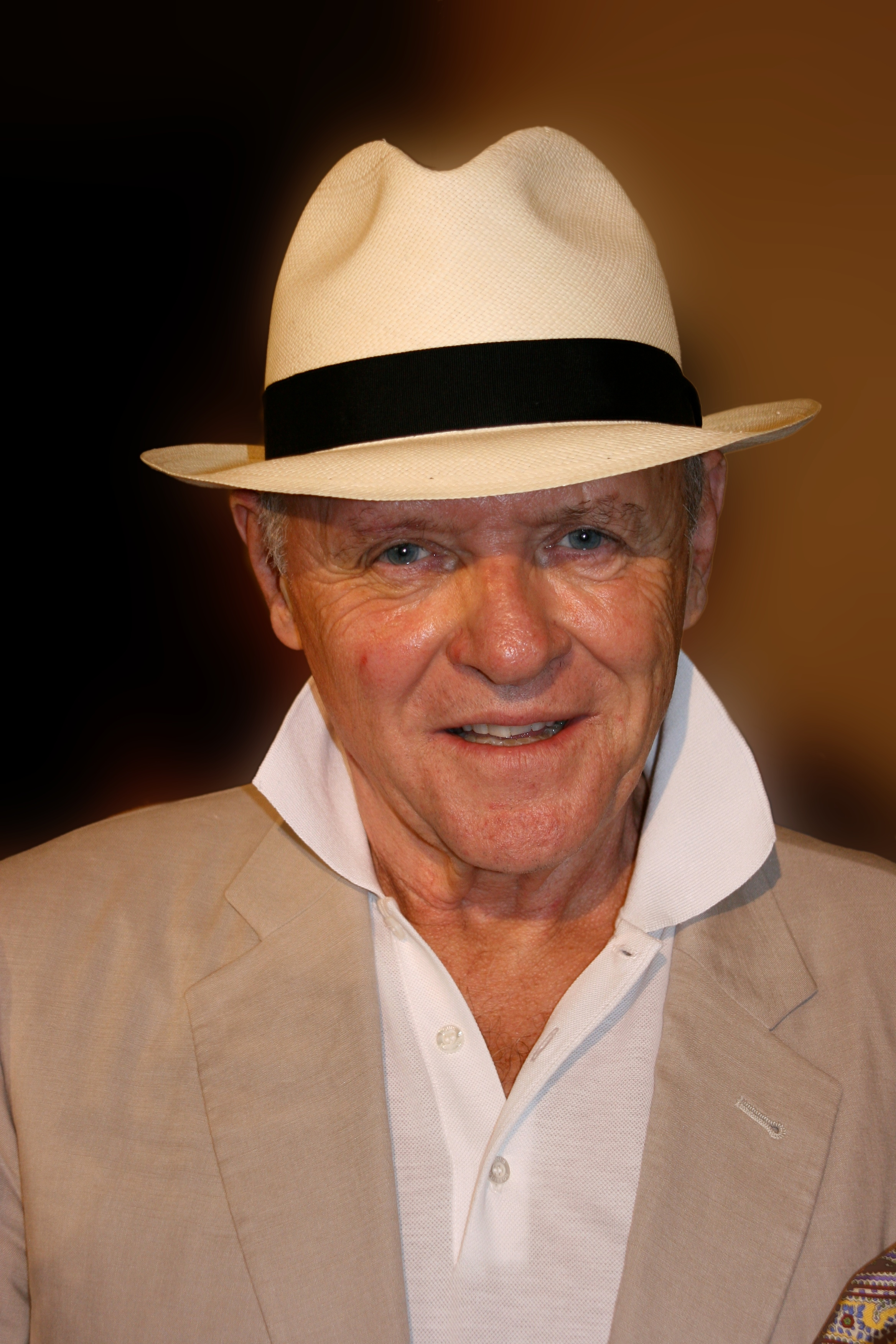
Anthony Hopkins, Best Actor winner

Frances McDormand, Best Actress winner and Best Film co-winner

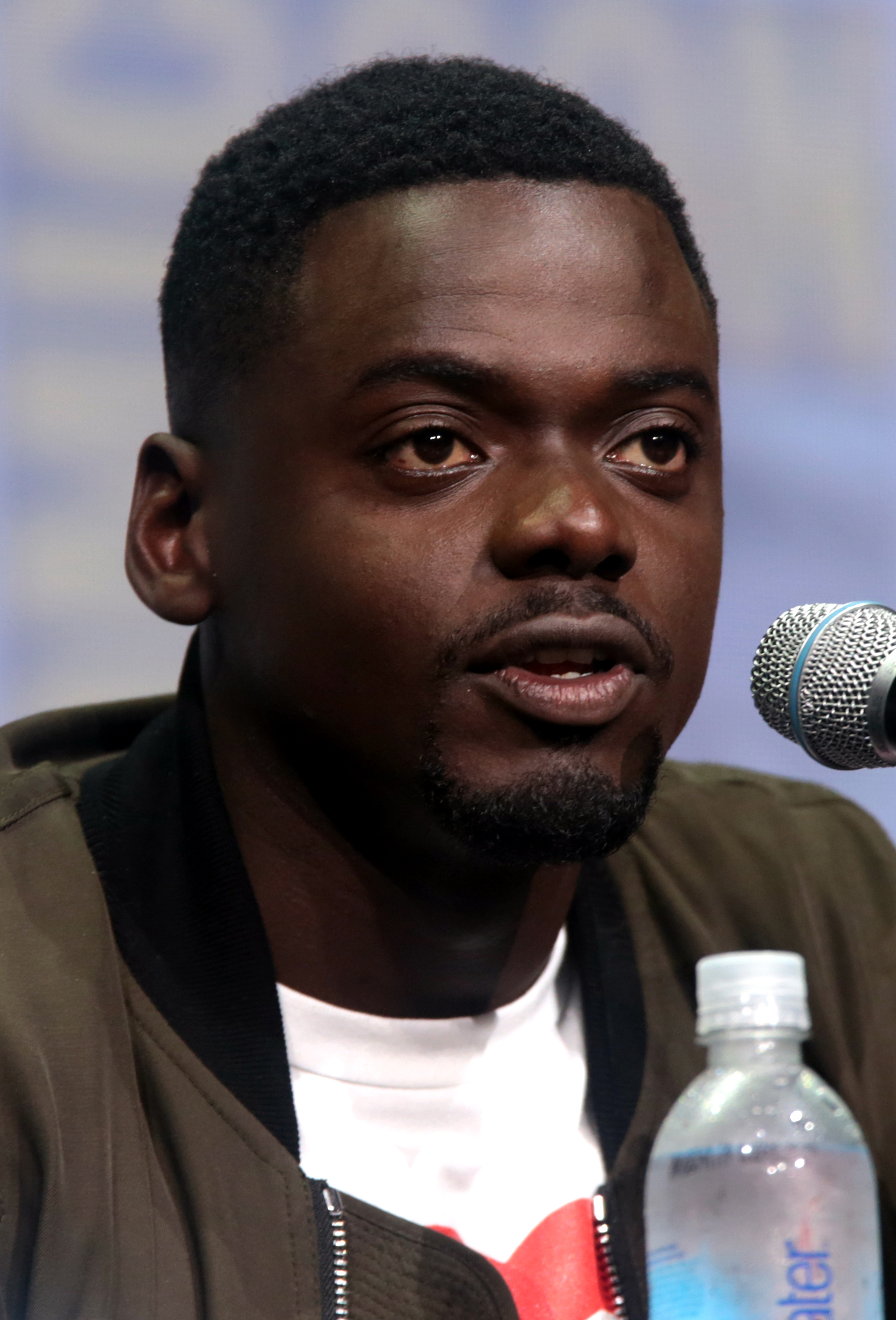
Daniel Kaluuya, Best Supporting Actor winner

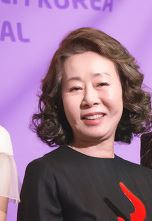
Youn Yuh-jung, Best Supporting Actress winner

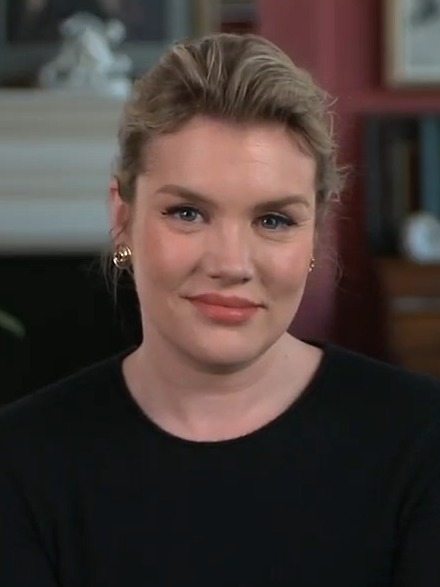
Emerald Fennell, Best Original Screenplay winner and Outstanding British Film co-winner

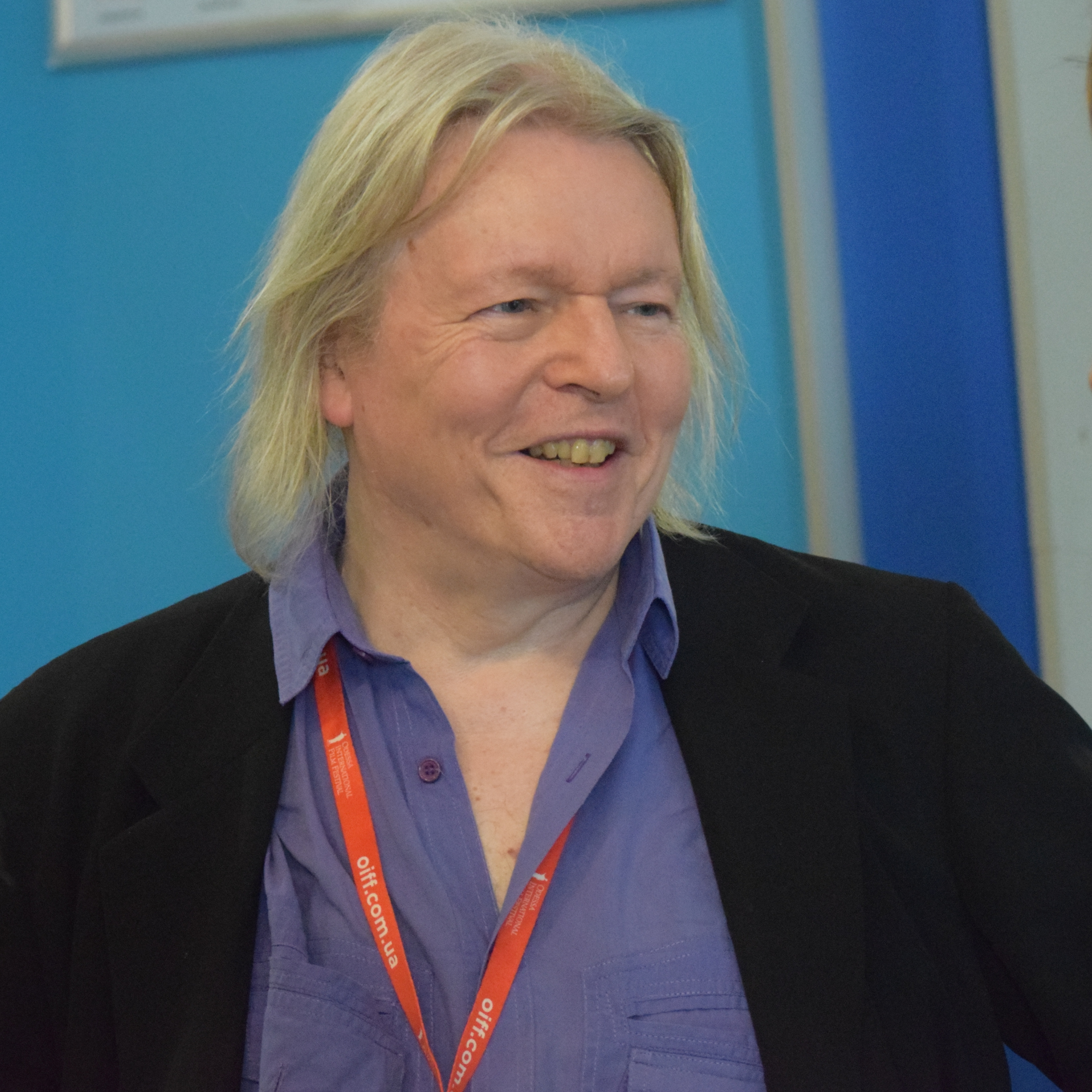
Christopher Hampton, Best Adapted Screenplay co-winner

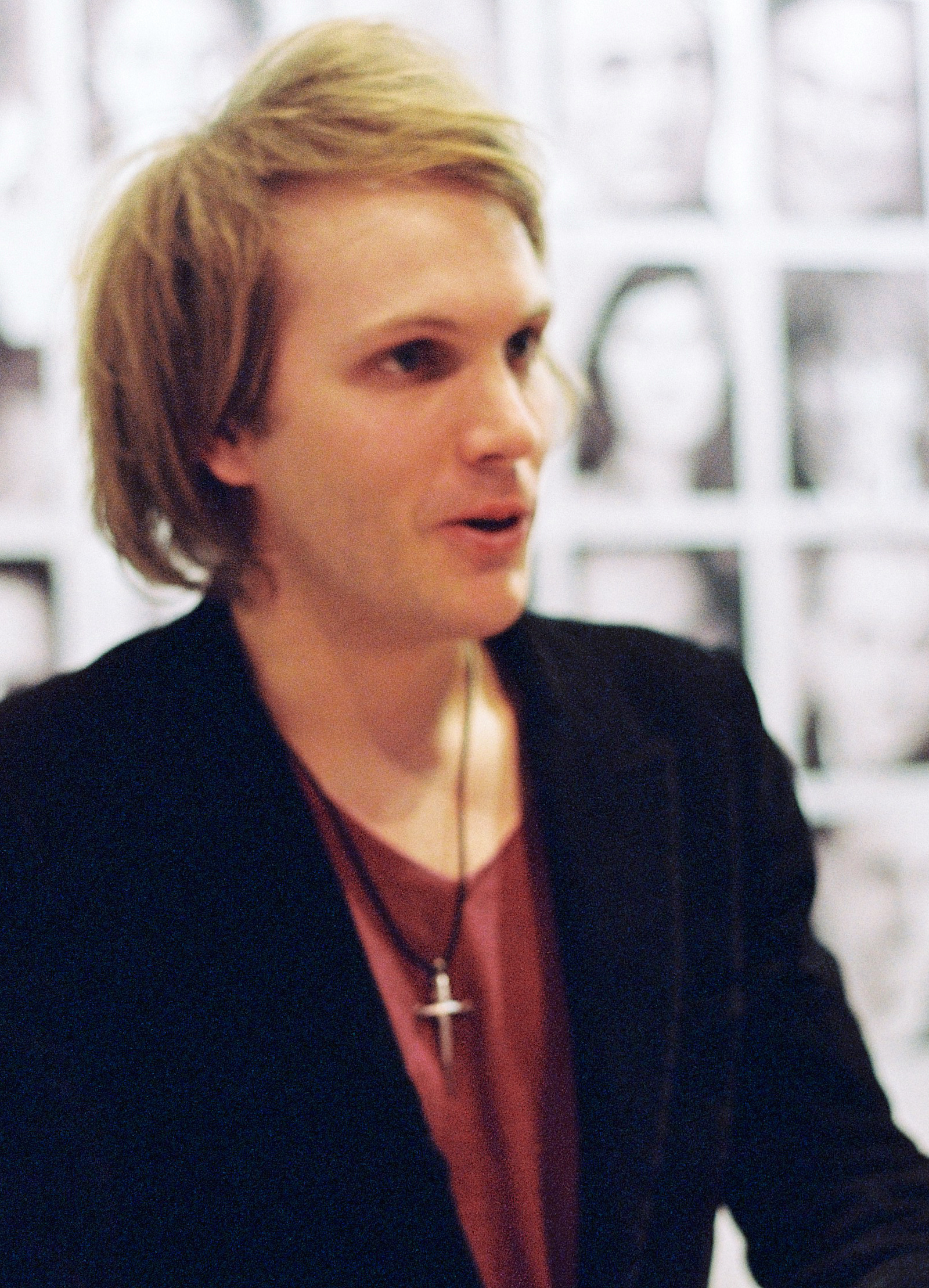
Florian Zeller, Best Adapted Screenplay co-winner

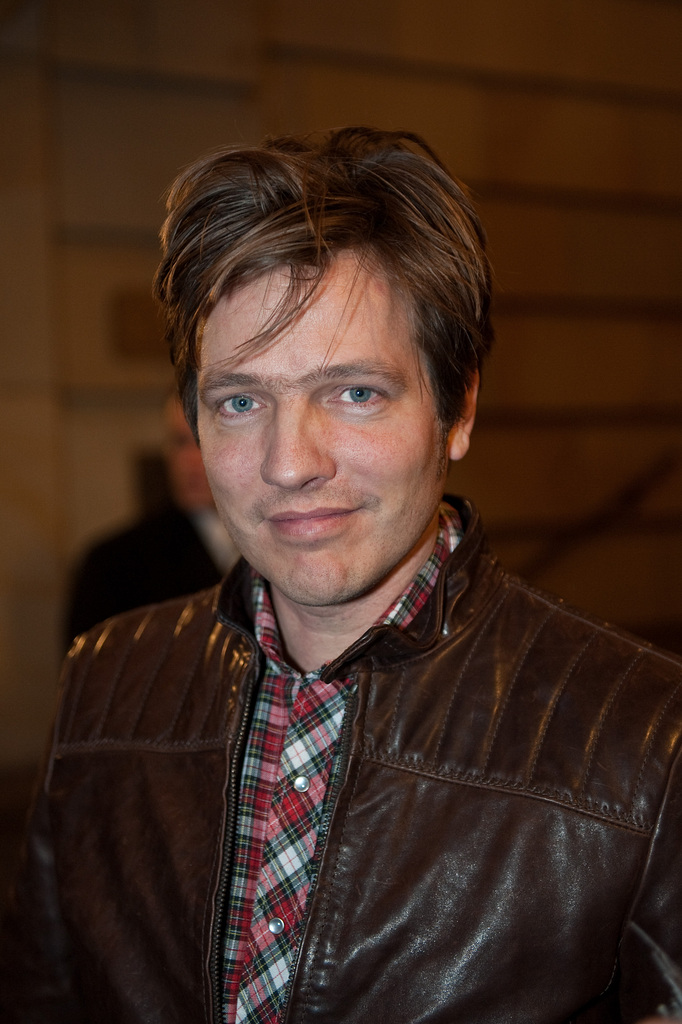
Thomas Vinterberg, Best Film Not in the English Language co-winner

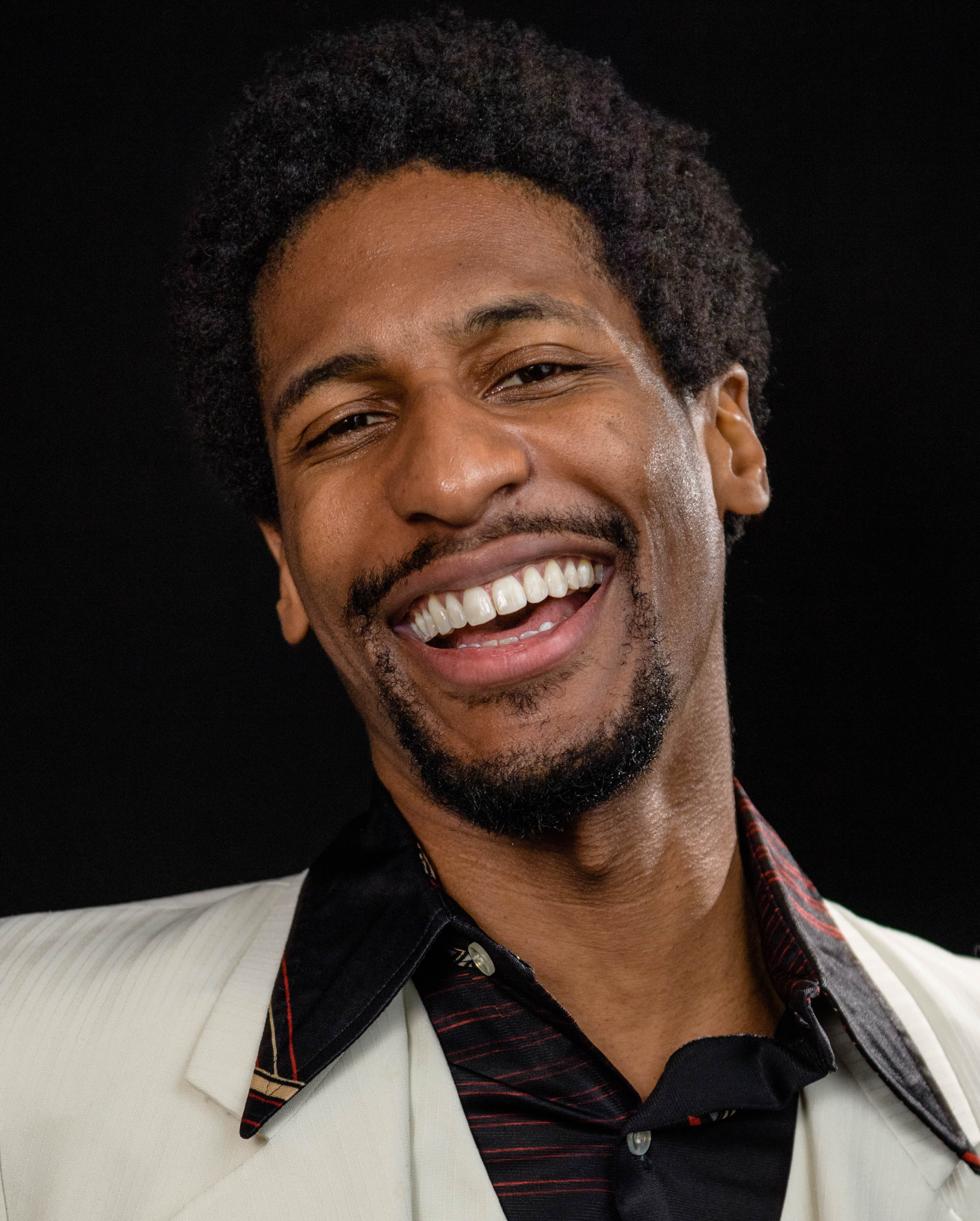
Jon Batiste, Best Original Music co-winner

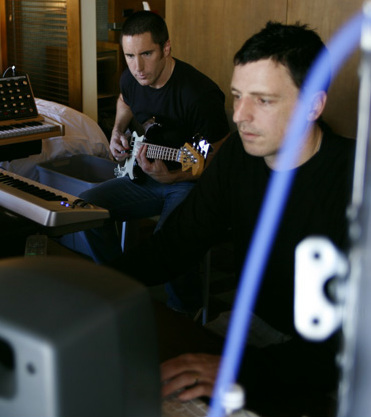
Trent Reznor (left) and Atticus Ross (right), Best Original Music co-winners

The nominees were announced on 9 March 2021. The winners were announced on 10 and 11 April 2021.

=== BAFTA Fellowship ===
- Ang Lee

=== Outstanding British Contribution to Cinema ===
- Noel Clarke (Note: On 29 April 2021, BAFTA revoked Clarke's award and membership of the organisation, following multiple allegations of professional and sexual misconduct. Many of the allegations came out as a response to the announcement that Clarke would be honoured.)

=== Awards ===
Winners are listed first, and highlighted in boldface.

**Best Film**: **Nomadland – Mollye Asher, Dan Janvey, Frances McDormand, Peter Spears and Chloé Zhao**; The Father – Philippe Carcassonne, Jean-Louis Livi and David Parfitt; The Mauritanian – Adam Ackland, Leah Clarke, Beatriz Levin and Lloyd Levin; Promising Young Woman – Ben Browning, Emerald Fennell, Ashley Fox and Josey McNamara; The Trial of the Chicago 7 – Stuart M. Besser and Marc Platt	**Best Director**: **Chloé Zhao – Nomadland**; Lee Isaac Chung – Minari; Sarah Gavron – Rocks; Shannon Murphy – Babyteeth; Thomas Vinterberg – Another Round; Jasmila Žbanić – Quo Vadis, Aida?
**Best Actor in a Leading Role**: **Anthony Hopkins – The Father as Anthony**; Riz Ahmed – Sound of Metal as Ruben Stone; Chadwick Boseman – Ma Rainey's Black Bottom as Levee Green; Adarsh Gourav – The White Tiger as Balram Halwai / Ashok Sharma; Mads Mikkelsen – Another Round as Martin; Tahar Rahim – The Mauritanian as Mohamedou Ould Slahi	**Best Actress in a Leading Role**: **Frances McDormand – Nomadland as Fern**; Bukky Bakray – Rocks as Olushola Omotoso; Radha Blank – The Forty-Year-Old Version as Radha; Vanessa Kirby – Pieces of a Woman as Martha Weiss; Wunmi Mosaku – His House as Rial; Alfre Woodard – Clemency as Warden Bernadine Williams
**Best Actor in a Supporting Role**: **Daniel Kaluuya – Judas and the Black Messiah as Fred Hampton**; Barry Keoghan – Calm with Horses as Dymphna; Alan Kim – Minari as David Yi; Leslie Odom Jr. – One Night in Miami... as Sam Cooke; Clarke Peters – Da 5 Bloods as Otis; Paul Raci – Sound of Metal as Joe	**Best Actress in a Supporting Role**: **Youn Yuh-jung – Minari as Soon-ja**; Niamh Algar – Calm with Horses as Ursula; Kosar Ali – Rocks as Sumaya; Maria Bakalova – Borat Subsequent Moviefilm as Tutar Sagdiyev; Dominique Fishback – Judas and the Black Messiah as Akua Njeri; Ashley Madekwe – County Lines as Toni
**Best Original Screenplay**: **Promising Young Woman – Emerald Fennell**; Another Round – Tobias Lindholm and Thomas Vinterberg; Mank – Jack Fincher; Rocks – Theresa Ikoko and Claire Wilson; The Trial of the Chicago 7 – Aaron Sorkin	**Best Adapted Screenplay**: **The Father – Christopher Hampton and Florian Zeller**; The Dig – Moira Buffini; The Mauritanian – Rory Haines, Sohrab Noshirvani and M.B. Traven; Nomadland – Chloé Zhao; The White Tiger – Ramin Bahrani
**Best Short Animation**: **The Owl and the Pussycat – Mole Hill and Laura Duncalf**; The Fire Next Time – Renaldho Pelle, Yanling Wang and Kerry Jade Kolbe; The Song of a Lost Boy – Daniel Quirke, Jamie MacDonald and Brid Arnstein	**Best Short Film**: **The Present – Farah Nabulsi**; Eyelash – Jesse Lewis Reece and Ike Newman; Lizard – Akinola Davies, Rachel Dargavel and Wale Davies; Lucky Break – John Addis and Rami Sarras Pantoja; Miss Curvy – Ghada Eldemellawy
**Best Animated Film**: **Soul – Pete Docter and Dana Murray**; Onward – Kori Rae and Dan Scanlon; Wolfwalkers – Tomm Moore, Ross Stewart and Paul Young	**Best Documentary**: **My Octopus Teacher – Pippa Ehrlich, James Reed and Craig Foster**; Collective – Alexander Nanau; David Attenborough: A Life on Our Planet – Alastair Fothergill, Jonnie Hughes and Keith Scholey; The Dissident – Bryan Fogel, Thor Halvorssen, Mark Monroe and Jake Swantko; The Social Dilemma – Jeff Orlowski and Larissa Phodes
**Best Film Not in the English Language**: **Another Round – Thomas Vinterberg, Kasper Dissing and Sisse Graum Jørgensen**; Dear Comrades! – Andrei Konchalovsky and Alisher Usmanov; Les Misérables – Ladj Ly, Toufik Ayadi and Christophe Barral; Minari – Lee Isaac Chung and Christina Oh; Quo Vadis, Aida? – Jasmila Žbanić and Damir Ibrahimovich	**Best Casting**: **Rocks – Lucy Pardee**; Calm with Horses – Shaheen Baig; Judas and the Black Messiah – Alexa L. Fogel; Minari – Julia Kim; Promising Young Woman – Lindsay Graham-Ahanonu and Mary Vernieu
**Best Cinematography**: **Nomadland – Joshua James Richards**; Judas and the Black Messiah – Sean Bobbitt; Mank – Erik Messerschmidt; The Mauritanian – Alwin H. Küchler; News of the World – Dariusz Wolski	**Best Costume Design**: **Ma Rainey's Black Bottom – Ann Roth**; Ammonite – Michael O'Connor; The Dig – Alice Babidge; Emma – Alexandra Byrne; Mank – Trish Summerville
**Best Editing**: **Sound of Metal – Mikkel E.G. Nielsen**; The Father – Yorgos Lamprinos; Nomadland – Chloé Zhao; Promising Young Woman – Frédéric Thoraval; The Trial of the Chicago 7 – Alan Baumgarten	**Best Makeup and Hair**: **Ma Rainey's Black Bottom – Matiki Anoff, Larry M. Cherry, Sergio Lopez-Rivera and Mia Neal**; The Dig – Jenny Shircore; Hillbilly Elegy – Patricia Dehaney, Eryn Krueger Mekash and Matthew W. Mungle; Mank – Colleen LaBaff, Kimberley Spiteri and Gigi Williams; Pinocchio – Dalia Colli, Mark Coulier and Francesco Pegoretti
**Best Original Music**: **Soul – Jon Batiste, Trent Reznor and Atticus Ross**; Mank – Trent Reznor and Atticus Ross; Minari – Emile Mosseri; News of the World – James Newton Howard; Promising Young Woman – Anthony Willis	**Best Production Design**: **Mank – Donald Graham Burt and Jan Pascale**; The Dig – Maria Djurkovic and Tatiana Macdonald; The Father – Peter Francis and Cathy Featherstone; News of the World – David Crank and Elizabeth Keenan; Rebecca – Sarah Greenwood and Katie Spencer
**Best Sound**: **Sound of Metal – Jaime Baksht, Nicolas Becker, Phillip Bladh, Carlos Cortés and Michelle Couttolenc**; Greyhound – Beau Borders, Christian P. Minkler, Michael Minkler, Warren Shaw and David Wyman; News of the World – Michael Fentum, William Miller, Mike Prestwood Smith, John Pritchett and Oliver Tarney; Nomadland – Sergio Díaz, Zach Seivers and M. Wolf Snyder; Soul – Coya Elliott, Ren Klyce and David Parker	**Best Special Visual Effects**: **Tenet – Scott R. Fisher, Andrew Jackson and Andrew Lockley**; Greyhound – Peter Bebb, Nathan McGuinness and Sebastian von Overheidt; The Midnight Sky – Matt Kasmir, Chris Lawrence, Max Solomon and David Watkins; Mulan – Sean Faden, Steve Ingram, Anders Langlands and Seth Maury; The One and Only Ivan – Santiago Colomo Martinez, Nick Davis, Greg Fisher and Ben Jones
**Outstanding British Film**: **Promising Young Woman – Emerald Fennell, Ben Browning, Ashley Fox and Josey McNamara**; Calm with Horses – Nick Rowland, Daniel Emmerson and Joe Murtagh; The Dig – Simon Stone, Gabrielle Tana and Moira Buffini; The Father – Florian Zeller, Philippe Carcassonne, Jean-Louis Livi, David Parfitt and Christopher Hampton; His House – Remi Weekes, Martin Gentles, Edward King and Roy Lee; Limbo – Ben Sharrock, Irune Gurtubai and Angus Lamont; The Mauritanian – Kevin Macdonald, Adam Ackland, Leah Clarke, Beatriz Levin, Lloyd Levin, Rory Haines, Sohrab Noshirvani and M.B. Traven; Mogul Mowgli – Bassam Tariq, Riz Ahmed, Thomas Benski and Bennett McGhee; Rocks – Sarah Gavron, Ameenah Ayub Allen, Faye Ward, Theresa Ikoko and Claire Wilson; Saint Maud – Rose Glass, Andrea Cornwell and Oliver Kassman	**Outstanding Debut by a British Writer, Director or Producer**: **His House – Remi Weekes (Writer/Director)**; Limbo – Ben Sharrock (Writer/Director) and Irune Gurtubai (Producer); Moffie – Jack Sidey (Writer/Producer); Rocks – Theresa Ikoko and Claire Wilson (Writer); Saint Maud – Rose Glass (Writer/Director) and Oliver Kassman (Producer)
**Rising Star Award**: **Bukky Bakray**; Kingsley Ben-Adir; Morfydd Clark; Ṣọpẹ Dìrísù; Conrad Khan

== Ceremony information ==
Both ceremonies were delayed two months due to the COVID-19 pandemic, taking place largely virtually, still lining up with the 93rd Academy Awards set to take place on 25 April 2021, two weeks following both British Academy of Film and Television Arts' (BAFTA) ceremonies. Despite its minimal live elements, the ceremonies still featured a red carpet in London and a step and repeat in Los Angeles.

The nominees were significantly more diverse than at any previous BAFTA Awards ceremony. Sixteen of the twenty-four nominees in the acting categories were from ethnic minority backgrounds. Four nominees for Best Director were women and three of the directors of films nominated for Best Film Not in the English Language were also women. The ceremony also introduced a new voting system for nominations after criticism over lack of diversity at the 73rd British Academy Film Awards. In the first round, voters compile a longlist in all categories (with a gender quota in the directing category). It is now compulsory for all voters to watch all long-listed films before the second round. In the second round, the nominees in the directing category and all four acting categories were decided by a small jury.

BBC radio and television presenter Clara Amfo hosted the Opening Night ceremony from the Royal Albert Hall, which aired on 10 April 2021 on BBC Two and BBC Two HD, and was joined by actress and screenwriter Joanna Scanlan, and film critic Rhianna Dhillon. The first ceremony awarded casting, craft, and short film categories, and Best Actor in a Supporting Role nominee Leslie Odom Jr. performed the song "Speak Now" from the film One Night in Miami.... Edith Bowman and Dermot O'Leary hosted the second night of the ceremony, which aired on 11 April 2021 on BBC One and BBC One HD. The co-hosts, who for several years have hosted BAFTA's live red carpet show, were joined by a small group of awards presenters at the Royal Albert Hall, as well as additional presenters via the internet from Los Angeles.

At the 11 April ceremony, the Royal Albert Hall was drenched in red light. Bowman and O'Leary led presentations to the all-virtual nominees, alongside a handful of actors as in-person presenters. The first musical performance of the night was a virtual duet, with two holograms of Liam Payne singing together. Catherine Shoard of The Guardian described the live virtual audience, present to laugh and applaud on cue, as "eerie". Shaord also opined that while the nominees were atypically diverse, including twenty-one first-time acting nominees, the eventual winners were traditional. She also asserted that Nomadland's four wins indicated it as the frontrunner for the upcoming Academy Awards.

Announced on 8 April 2021, both ceremonies had been intended to feature Prince William, Duke of Cambridge, the president of BAFTA. At the opening ceremony, he planned to speak virtually with filmmakers about the hardships of film production during the COVID-19 pandemic and would have presented a video speech about the resilience of the film industry during the 11 April ceremony. However, he pulled out from public engagements due to the death of his grandfather, Prince Philip, Duke of Edinburgh, on 9 April 2021.

Chloé Zhao became only the second female winner for Best Director (following Kathryn Bigelow in 2010), and the first woman of colour to take the prize; she also shared Best Film with four other producers. Neither Best Actor in a Leading Role winner Anthony Hopkins (for The Father) nor Best Actress in a Leading Role winner Frances McDormand (for Nomadland), who also co-won Best Film, attended the ceremony and were able to be on camera when their wins were announced. At age 83, Hopkins become the oldest Best Actor winner, beating out expected posthumous nominee Chadwick Boseman (for Ma Rainey's Black Bottom); though he was not present when his win was announced, Hopkins did deliver an acceptance speech at the press interviews following the event. Hopkins' last competitive BAFTA win was twenty-seven years earlier (for The Remains of the Day). Another unexpected win was first-time screenwriter and director Emerald Fennell for Best Original Screenplay (for Promising Young Woman). Fennell accepted her award while eating a chocolate BAFTA mask. Other films with high expectations, including The Trial of the Chicago 7, News of the World and Borat Subsequent Moviefilm, won zero awards, while Mank only won one (Best Production Design).

Death was a theme among other acceptance speeches; in accepting her Rising Star Award, actress Bukky Bakray paid tribute to rapper DMX, who also died on 9 April 2021, as well as recently deceased members of her own friends and family, while Thomas Vinterberg, who co-won for Best Film Not in the English Language with Another Round, spoke of his daughter who died during production. South Korean actress Youn Yuh-jung, who won for Best Supporting Actress (for Minari), opened her speech with an address to the British people watching, offering condolences following the death of the Duke of Edinburgh. Youn then lightened the mood by noting that she was surprised and more grateful to win due to the perception of British people as "snobbish". The acceptance speeches of Daniel Kaluuya and Remi Weekes thanked minority voices.

== Statistics ==
Films that received multiple nominations
Nominations	Film
7	Nomadland
7	Rocks
6	The Father
6	Mank
6	Minari
6	Promising Young Woman
5	The Dig
5	The Mauritanian
4	Another Round
4	Calm with Horses
4	Judas and the Black Messiah
4	News of the World
4	Sound of Metal
3	His House
3	Ma Rainey's Black Bottom
3	Soul
3	The Trial of the Chicago 7
2	Greyhound
2	Limbo
2	Quo Vadis, Aida?
2	Saint Maud
2	The White Tiger

Films that received multiple awards
Awards	Film
4	Nomadland
2	The Father
2	Ma Rainey's Black Bottom
2	Promising Young Woman
2	Soul
2	Sound of Metal

== In Memoriam ==
The In Memoriam recognised people who died since the previous ceremony and who had an impact on the British film industry, as well as those related to nominated films. This year's montage was played to Ennio Morricone's "Love Theme for Nata" from Cinema Paradiso, who was included within the montage.

- Prince Philip, Duke of Edinburgh
- Ennio Morricone
- Sir Sean Connery
- George Segal
- Michael Chapman
- Allen Daviau
- Bertrand Tavernier
- Barbara Jefford
- Irrfan Khan
- Nikita Pearl Waligwa
- Pamela Mann-Francis
- Ben Cross
- Sir Ian Holm
- Yaphet Kotto
- Trevor Green
- Frank Pierce
- Cicely Tyson
- Hilary Heath
- Paul Heller
- David Prowse
- Michael Lonsdale
- Dame Barbara Windsor
- Peter Lamont
- Bill Gavin
- Robert Mitchell
- Dame Olivia de Havilland
- Michael Apted
- John Fraser
- Chadwick Boseman
- Joel Schumacher
- Brian Dennehy
- Wilford Brimley
- Sir Alan Parker
- Sue Bruce-Smith
- Arthur Wooster
- Giuseppe Rotunno
- Michael Wolf Snyder
- Max von Sydow
- Rishi Kapoor
- Sir Ronald Harwood
- Kirk Douglas
- Alberto Grimaldi
- Larry McMurtry
- Christopher Plummer

As well as appearing first in the montage, Prince Philip, Duke of Edinburgh, royal consort and first president of BAFTA, who died the day before the opening ceremony, was paid tribute in the opening monologues on both nights of the awards. Dame Diana Rigg was omitted from the montage, which sparked complaints and controversy; in response, BAFTA explained that it considered her most prominent in television, and so she would be featured at the next British Academy Television Awards ceremony.

== See also ==
- 10th AACTA International Awards
- 93rd Academy Awards
- 46th César Awards
- 26th Critics' Choice Awards
- 73rd Directors Guild of America Awards
- 34th European Film Awards
- 78th Golden Globe Awards
- 41st Golden Raspberry Awards
- 35th Goya Awards
- 36th Independent Spirit Awards
- 26th Lumière Awards
- 11th Magritte Awards
- 8th Platino Awards
- 32nd Producers Guild of America Awards
- 25th Satellite Awards
- 46th Saturn Awards
- 27th Screen Actors Guild Awards
- 73rd Writers Guild of America Awards
