= List of Academy Award winners and nominees from Mexico =

This is a list of Mexican Academy Award winners and nominees. This list details the performances of Mexican filmmakers, actors, actresses and films that have either been submitted, nominated or have won an Academy Award.

== List of winners ==
Name	#	Academy Awards	Title	Year
Alfonso Cuarón	5	Best Director	Gravity	2013
Alfonso Cuarón	5	Best Film Editing	Gravity	2013
Alfonso Cuarón	5	Best Director	Roma	2018
Alfonso Cuarón	5	Best Cinematography	Roma	2018
Alfonso Cuarón	5	Best Foreign Language Film	Roma	2018
Alejandro González Iñárritu	5	Special Achievement	Flesh and Sand	2017
Alejandro González Iñárritu	5	Best Director	The Revenant	2015
Alejandro González Iñárritu	5	Best Picture	Birdman	2014
Alejandro González Iñárritu	5	Best Director	Birdman	2014
Alejandro González Iñárritu	5	Best Original Screenplay	Birdman	2014
Emmanuel Lubezki	3	Best Cinematography	The Revenant	2015
Emmanuel Lubezki	3	Best Cinematography	Birdman	2014
Emmanuel Lubezki	3	Best Cinematography	Gravity	2013
Guillermo del Toro	3	Best Picture	The Shape of Water	2017
Guillermo del Toro	3	Best Director	The Shape of Water	2017
Guillermo del Toro	3	Best Animated Picture	Guillermo del Toro's Pinocchio	2022
Anthony Quinn	2	Best Supporting Actor	Lust for Life	1956
Anthony Quinn	2	Best Supporting Actor	Viva Zapata!	1952
Emile Kuri	2	Best Production Design	20,000 Leagues Under the Sea	1954
Emile Kuri	2	Best Production Design	The Heiress	1949
Manuel Arango	2	Best Documentary (Short Subject)	Sentinels of Silence	1971
Manuel Arango	2	Best Live Action Short Film	Sentinels of Silence	1971
Lupita Nyong'o	1	Best Supporting Actress	12 Years a Slave	2013
Guillermo Navarro	1	Best Cinematography	El Laberinto del Fauno	2006
Eugenio Caballero	1	Best Production Design	El Laberinto del Fauno	2006
Brigitte Broch	1	Best Production Design	Moulin Rouge!	2001
Edward Carrere	1	Best Production Design	Camelot	1967
Jaime Baksht	1	Best Sound	Sound of Metal	2020
Michelle Couttolenc	1	Best Sound	Sound of Metal	2020
Carlos Cortés	1	Best Sound	Sound of Metal	2020

== Special Achievement ==
Special Achievement Academy Award
Year	Name	Film	Status	Milestone / Notes
2017	Alejandro González Iñárritu	Flesh and Sand	Recipient	First Mexican to receive this award.

== Best Picture ==
This list focuses on Mexican-born producers.

Academy Award for Best Picture
Year	Name	Film	Status	Milestone / Notes
2006	Alejandro González Iñárritu	Babel	Nominated	Shared with Steve Golin and Jon Kilik.
2013	Alfonso Cuarón	Gravity	Nominated	Shared with David Heyman.
2014	Alejandro González Iñárritu	Birdman	Won	Shared with John Lesher and James W. Skotchdopole.
2015	Alejandro González Iñárritu	The Revenant	Nominated	Shared with Arnon Milchan, Steve Golin, Mary Parent and Keith Redmon.
2017	Guillermo del Toro	The Shape of Water	Won	Shared with J. Miles Dale.
2018	Alfonso Cuarón	Roma	Nominated	Shared with Gabriela Rodriguez.
2021	Guillermo del Toro	Nightmare Alley	Nominated	Shared with J. Miles Dale and Bradley Cooper.
2025	Guillermo del Toro	Frankenstein	Nominated	Shared with J. Miles Dale and Scott Stuber.

== Best Director ==
This list focuses on Mexican-born directors.

Academy Award for Best Director
Year	Name	Film	Status	Milestone / Notes
2006	Alejandro González Iñárritu	Babel	Nominated	First Mexican to be nominated for Best Director.
2013	Alfonso Cuarón	Gravity	Won	First Mexican and Latin American to win Best Director.
2014	Alejandro González Iñárritu	Birdman	Won	First Mexican and Latin American to be nominated for Best Director twice.
2015	Alejandro González Iñárritu	The Revenant	Won	First Mexican and Latin American to win Best Director two times. Third director in history to win consecutive Best Director Academy Awards. First Mexican and Latin American to be nominated for Best Director three times.
2017	Guillermo del Toro	The Shape of Water	Won	
2018	Alfonso Cuarón	Roma	Won	First person to win for Best Director and Best Cinematography.

== Best Actor ==
This list focuses on Mexican-born actors.

=== Leading ===
Academy Award for Best Actor
Year	Name	Film	Status	Milestone / Notes
1957	Anthony Quinn	Wild Is the Wind	Nominated	
1964	Anthony Quinn	Zorba the Greek	Nominated	
2012	Demián Bichir	A Better Life	Nominated	

=== Supporting ===
Academy Award for Best Supporting Actor
Year	Name	Film	Status	Milestone / Notes
1952	Anthony Quinn	Viva Zapata!	Won	
1956	Anthony Quinn	Lust for Life	Won	First Mexican-born actor to win two Oscars in the same category.

== Best Actress ==
This list focuses on Mexican-born actresses.

=== Leading ===
Academy Award for Best Actress
Year	Name	Film	Status	Milestone / Notes
2002	Salma Hayek	Frida	Nominated	First Mexican actress to be nominated for Best Leading Actress.
2018	Yalitza Aparicio	Roma	Nominated	Debut performance. First Indigenous Latin American (Indigenous Mexican) to be nominated in any category.

=== Supporting ===
Academy Award for Best Supporting Actress
Year	Name	Film	Status	Milestone / Notes
1954	Katy Jurado	Broken Lance	Nominated	First Mexican and Hispanic actress to be nominated for Best Supporting Actress.
2006	Adriana Barraza	Babel	Nominated	
2013	Lupita Nyong'o	12 Years a Slave	Won	Mexican with Kenyan citizenship. First Mexican-born actress to win an Academy Award.
2018	Marina de Tavira	Roma	Nominated	

== Best Animated Feature Film ==
Academy Award for Best Animated Feature
Year	Name	Film	Status	Milestone / Notes
2021	Carlos López Estrada	Raya and the Last Dragon	Nominated	Shared with Don Hall, Osnat Shurer and Peter Del Vecho.
2022	Guillermo del Toro	Guillermo del Toro's Pinocchio	Won	Shared with Mark Gustafson, Gary Ungar and Alex Bulkley.

== Best Cinematography ==
This list focuses on Mexican-born cinematographers.

Academy Award for Best Cinematography
Year	Name	Film	Status	Milestone / Notes
1964	Gabriel Figueroa	The Night of the Iguana	Nominated	
1975	John A. Alonzo	Chinatown	Nominated	First American-born Latino to be nominated for Best Cinematography.
1995	Emmanuel Lubezki	A Little Princess	Nominated	
1999	Emmanuel Lubezki	Sleepy Hollow	Nominated	
2005	Emmanuel Lubezki	The New World	Nominated	
2005	Rodrigo Prieto	Brokeback Mountain	Nominated	
2006	Emmanuel Lubezki	Children of Men	Nominated	
2006	Guillermo Navarro	Pan's Labyrinth	Won	Original title: El laberinto del fauno
2011	Emmanuel Lubezki	The Tree of Life	Nominated	
2013	Emmanuel Lubezki	Gravity	Won	
2014	Emmanuel Lubezki	Birdman	Won	
2015	Emmanuel Lubezki	The Revenant	Won	First cinematographer to win three years in a row. First Mexican and Latin American to win the Oscars three times. First Mexican Jews to be nominated and to win an Academy Award in any category.
2016	Rodrigo Prieto	Silence	Nominated	
2018	Alfonso Cuarón	Roma	Won	First Mexican director to be nominated for Best Cinematography while serving as both director and cinematographer. First Mexican director to win for Best Director and Best Cinematography in the same year.
2019	Rodrigo Prieto	The Irishman	Nominated	
2023	Rodrigo Prieto	Killers of the Flower Moon	Nominated	

== Best Costume Design ==
Academy Award for Best Costume Design
Year	Name	Film	Status	Milestone / Notes
2019	Mayes C. Rubeo	Jojo Rabbit	Nominated	First Mexican and Latin American costume designer to be nominated for Best Costume Design.

== Best Documentary Feature ==
This list focuses on documentaries features directed by Mexican-born filmmakers.

Academy Award for Best Documentary Feature
Year	Film	Name	Status	Milestone / Notes
1957	Torero!	Manuel Barbachano Ponce	Nominated	
1969	The Olympics in Mexico	Alberto Isaac	Nominated	
1985	The Mothers of Plaza de Mayo	Lourdes Portillo	Nominated	Shared with Susana Blaustein Muñoz.
2001	Promises	Carlos Bolado	Nominated	Shared with B.Z. Goldberg and Justine Shapiro.

== Best Documentary Short Subject ==
This list focuses on documentaries short subject directed by Mexican-born filmmakers.

Academy Award for Best Documentary Short Subject
Year	Film	Name	Status	Milestone / Notes
1971	Sentinels of Silence	Manuel Arango	Won	Original title: Centinelas del silencio Shared with Robert Amram. This was the only time that a short film won Oscars in two categories.

== Best Film Editing ==
This list focuses on Mexican-born film editors.

Academy Award for Best Film Editing
Year	Name	Film	Status	Milestone / Notes
2006	Alfonso Cuarón	Children of Men	Nominated	Shared with Alex Rodriguez.
2013	Alfonso Cuarón	Gravity	Won	Shared with Mark Sanger.

== Best International Feature Film ==
This list focuses on Mexican films that won or were nominated for the foreign language film award.

Academy Award for Best Foreign Language Film
Year	Film	Director	Status	Milestone / Notes
1960	Macario	Roberto Gavaldón	Nominated	First Latin American and Mexican film to be nominated for Best Foreign Language Film.
1961	The Important Man	Ismael Rodríguez	Nominated	Original title: Ánimas Trujano
1962	The Pearl of Tlayucan	Luis Alcoriza	Nominated	Original title: Tlayucan
1975	Letters from Marusia	Miguel Littín	Nominated	Original title: Actas de Marusia
2000	Love's a Bitch	Alejandro González Iñárritu	Nominated	Original title: Amores Perros
2002	The Crime of Father Amaro	Carlos Carrera	Nominated	Original title: El Crimen del Padre Amaro
2006	Pan's Labyrinth	Guillermo del Toro	Nominated	Original title: El Laberinto del Fauno; The film was nominated for five other Academy Awards, and won three of them: Best Art Direction, Best Cinematography and Best Makeup.
2010	Biutiful	Alejandro González Iñárritu	Nominated	Second nomination for Best Foreign Language Film to a film directed by Alejandro González Iñárritu.
2018	Roma	Alfonso Cuarón	Won	First Mexican film to be nominated in the Best Foreign Language Film and to be simultaneously nominated for Best Picture.

== Best Live Action Short Film ==
This list focuses on live action short-films directed by Mexican-born filmmakers.

Academy Award for Best Live Action Short Film
Year	Film	Name	Status	Milestone / Notes
1971	Sentinels of Silence	Manuel Arango	Won	Original title: Centinelas del silencio Shared with Robert Amram. This was the only time that a short film won Oscars in two categories.
1996	De tripas, corazón	Antonio Urrutia	Nominated	
2022	Le pupille	Alfonso Cuarón	Nominated	Shared with Alice Rohrwacher

== Best Makeup ==
This list focuses on Mexican-born makeup artists.

Academy Award for Best Makeup and Hairstyling
Year	Name	Film	Status	Milestone / Notes
2008	Mike Elizalde	Hellboy II: The Golden Army	Nominated	

== Best Original Score ==
Academy Award for Best Original Score
Year	Name	Film	Status	Milestone / Notes
1970	Bill Melendez	A Boy Named Charlie Brown	Nominated	The category was Best Music, Original Song Score. Shared with Rod McKuen, John Scott Trotter, Alan Shean, and Vince Guaraldi.

== Best Production Design ==
This list focuses on Mexican-born art directors/production designers and set decorators.

Academy Award for Best Production Design
Year	Name	Film	Status	Milestone / Notes
1942	Emile Kuri	Silver Queen	Nominated	Mexican-born American set decorator of Lebanese descent.
1949	Emile Kuri	The Heiress	Won	
1949	Edward Carrere	Adventures of Don Juan	Nominated	Shared with Lyle Reifsnider.
1952	Emile Kuri	Carrie	Nominated	
1954	Emile Kuri	20,000 Leagues Under the Sea	Won	
1954	Emile Kuri	Executive Suite	Nominated	
1959	John DeCuir	The Big Fisherman	Nominated	
1960	Edward Carrere	Sunrise at Campobello	Nominated	Shared with George James Hopkins.
1961	Emile Kuri	The Absent-Minded Professor	Nominated	
1961	Fernando Carrere	The Children's Hour	Nominated	
1963	John DeCuir	Cleopatra	Won	
1964	Emile Kuri	Mary Poppins	Nominated	
1967	Edward Carrere	Camelot	Won	Shared with John Truscott and John W. Brown.
1967	John DeCuir	The Taming of the Shrew	Nominated	
1969	John DeCuir	Hello, Dolly!	Won	
1971	Emile Kuri	Bedknobs and Broomsticks	Nominated	
1996	Brigitte Broch	Romeo + Juliet	Nominated	German-born Mexican art director. Shared with Catherine Martin.
2001	Brigitte Broch	Moulin Rouge!	Won	German-born Mexican art director. Shared with Catherine Martin.
2002	Felipe Fernández del Paso; Hania Robledo	Frida	Nominated	
2006	Eugenio Caballero	Pan's Labyrinth	Won	Original title: El laberinto del fauno Shared with Pilar Revuelta.
2018	Eugenio Caballero; Bárbara Enríquez	Roma	Nominated	

== Best Sound ==
This list focuses on Mexican-born sound editors and mixers.

Prior to the 93rd Academy Awards, the Best Sound Mixing and Best Sound Editing were separate categories.

Academy Award for Best Sound
Year	Name	Film	Category	Status	Milestone / Notes
2006	Fernando Cámara	Apocalypto	Mixing	Nominated	
2012	José Antonio García	Argo	Mixing	Nominated	
2014	Martin Hernández	Birdman	Editing	Nominated	Shared with Aaron Glascock.
2015	Martin Hernández	The Revenant	Editing	Nominated	Shared with Lon Bender.
2018	José Antonio García	Roma	Mixing	Nominated	Shared with Skip Lievsay and Craig Henighan.
2018	Sergio Díaz	Roma	Editing	Nominated	Shared with Skip Lievsay.
2020	Jaime Baksht; Michelle Couttolenc; Carlos Cortés Navarrete	Sound of Metal	Sound	Won	Shared with Nicolas Becker and Phillip Bladh.
2025	José Antonio García	One Battle After Another	Sound	Nominated	Shared with Christopher Scarabosio and Tony Villaflor.

== Best Writing (Screenplay) ==
This list focuses on Mexican-born writers.

=== Adapted ===
Academy Award for Best Writing (Adapted Screenplay)
Year	Name	Film	Status	Milestone / Notes
2006	Alfonso Cuarón	Children of Men	Nominated	Shared with Hawk Otsby, Timothy J. Sexton and Mark Fergus.
2025	Guillermo del Toro	Frankenstein	Nominated	

=== Original ===
Academy Award for Best Writing (Original Screenplay)
Year	Name	Film	Status	Milestone / Notes
2002	Alfonso Cuarón; Carlos Cuarón	And Your Mother Too	Nominated	Original title: Y Tu Mamá También
2006	Guillermo Arriaga	Babel	Nominated	
2006	Guillermo del Toro	Pan's Labyrinth	Nominated	Original title: El Laberinto del Fauno
2014	Alejandro González Iñárritu	Birdman	Won	Shared with Alexander Dinelaris Jr., and Nicolás Giacobone and Armando Bo.
2017	Guillermo del Toro	The Shape of Water	Nominated	Shared with Vanessa Taylor. Story by Guillermo del Toro.
2018	Alfonso Cuarón	Roma	Nominated	

== Best Visual Effects ==
Academy Award for Best Visual Effects
Year	Name	Film	Status	Milestone / Notes
1947	Paul Lerpae	Unconquered	Nominated	Mexican born-American special effects artist.

== Nominations and Winners ==
No. of wins	No. of nominations
28	100

== See also ==
- Cinema of Mexico
- List of Mexican films
