= Charu Suri =

First Jazz Indian American Composer

- Origin: Indo-American
- Genres: Jazz, Classical music
- Website: charusuri.com

Charu Suri is an Indo-American jazz composer and pianist known for her style of blending Indian ragas with jazz. At the 2026 Grammy Awards, she received a nomination for the album Shayan in the Best Contemporary Instrumental Album category. Shayan has 6 Album Producers: Charu Suri, Margee Minier Tubbs, Siddhant Bhatia, Devan Ekambaram, Tess Remy-Schumacher, Raniero Palm along with numerous featured guest artists among them: acclaimed multi-instrumentalist, Premik Russell Tubbs (Flute), Jim “Kimo” West – Grammy® Winner (Guitar), Raniero Palm & the Venezuela String Recording Ensemble – Grammy® Winner (Strings), Ron Korb – Grammy® Winner (Flute) Max ZT – Grammy® Nominee (Dulcimer), Tess Remy-Schumacher (Cello), Anita Lerche (Vocals), Ravichandra Kulur (Flute), Siyer (Vocals), Haruna Fukazawa (Flute), Philip Vaiman (Violin), Mary Dawood Catlin (Vocals), Peter Sterling (Harp), Ramya Shankar (Ukulele).

In 2021, she was selected by BJ Sam, the Nigerian international singer and producer, to represent India in the first universal Christmas music project with other global music icons including Hollywood Actor Paul_Raci, Bollywood playback singer Jaspinder Narula, Ghanaian singer Diana Hopeson, and Swiss actress Christina Zurbrügg.
