= Kobi Hemaa Osisiadan =

Ghanaian television presenter (born 1983)

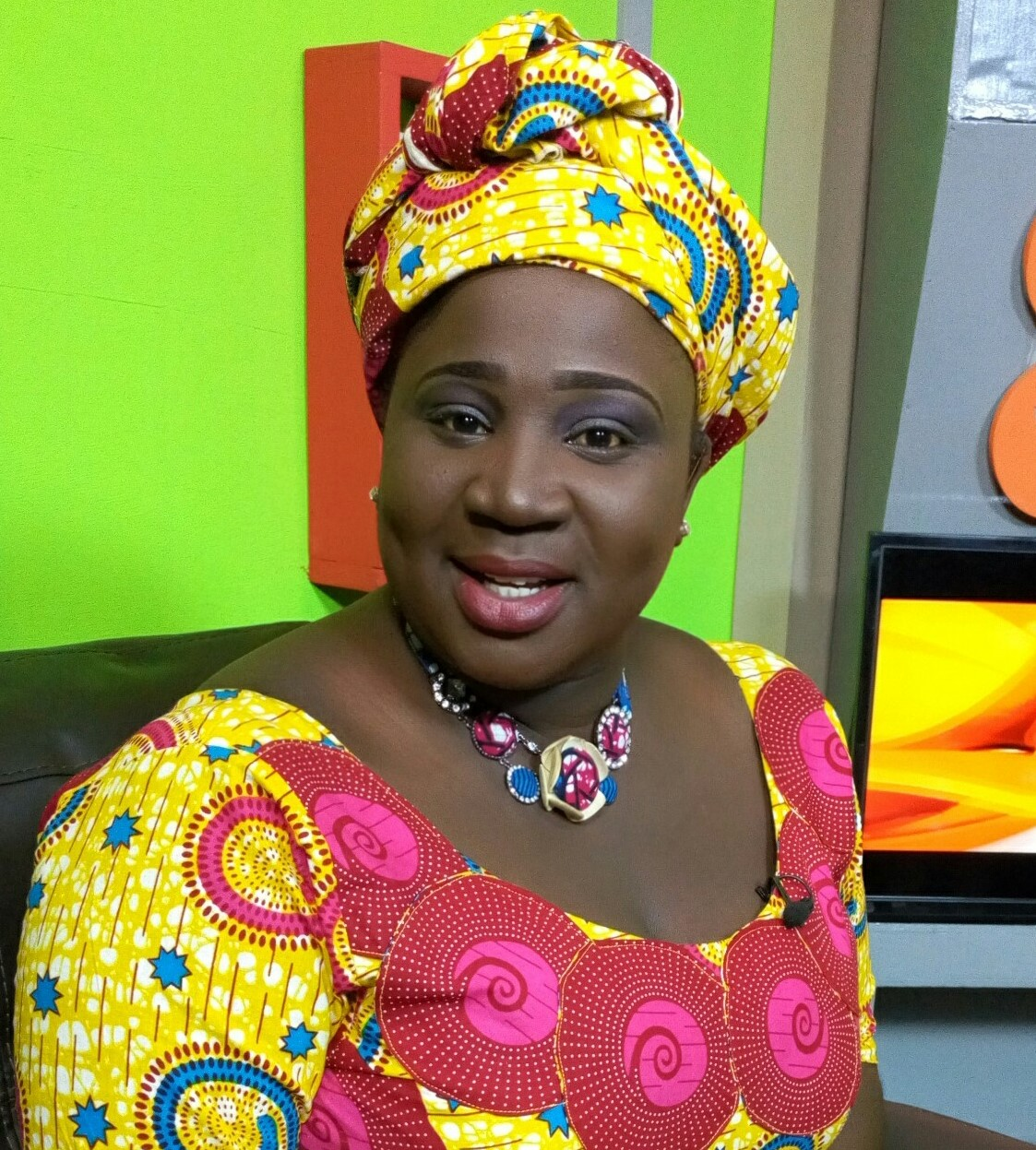
- Born: 30 November 1983 (age 42); Kumasi, Ghana
- Education: Regent University College of Science and Technology; Maastricht University (MBA)
- Occupation: Communication strategist
- Employer: Head of Corporate Communication Ghana Post
- Spouse: Emmanuel Bekoe
- Children: 3

Afia Serwaa Kobi Hemaa Osisiadan-Bekoe (born 30 November 1983) is a Ghanaian female entrepreneur, TV presenter and communication specialist. She has had a career in the media industry for over ten years. She is currently the head of corporate communication at Ghana Post Company Limited and the founder of Angeles Foundation an agency which focuses on boy-child empowerment and entrepreneurial skills.

== Education ==
She has a degree in Accounting and Information System from the Regent University College of Science and Technology, Accra. She went on to pursue Master of Business Administration in Corporate Strategy and Economic Policy at Maastricht School of Management in Netherlands from 2011 to 2013.

== Career ==
Her first step in the media industry was at TV Africa where she hosted "Ghana’s Pride" in 2007. The programme sought to project the rich Ghanaian culture while showcasing the various Ghanaian products on the market.

In 2009, she made her way to the Ghana Broadcasting Corporation with the same programme. She created another programme dubbed "Ohemaa Dwaso".

She headed to Multi TV in 2014 with a programme called "Exclusive to Cancer". In 2015, she became the programme's manager of Light TV and later at Homebase TV where she doubled as the morning show host and the head of the TV department.

She was the Director of TV at Homebase television till March 2018.

She co-hosted the Homebase TV morning show known as Eboboba until she came up with a programme called ‘Beyond the Ballot’ which is a social political show that airs on TV every Wednesday at 8pm to 10pm.

Kobi Hemaa Osisiadan is popularly known as the voice that promotes Made-in-Ghana products and also addresses many societal issues.

She marked her 10th anniversary in April 2017 and as part of the celebration, she started a foundation known as Angeles Foundation which focuses on boy-child empowerment, cancer education and development of entrepreneurial skills.

She is currently the head of corporate communication at the Ghana Post Company Limited.

== Personal life ==
Born to Sylvia Ofori and Prince Anane-Acheampong Osisiadan, Kobi Hemaa Osisiadan is the fourth child out of five children of her parents. She is married with three kids to Mr. Emmanuel Bekoe who is a news editor at Peace FM.
