= Diana Hopeson =

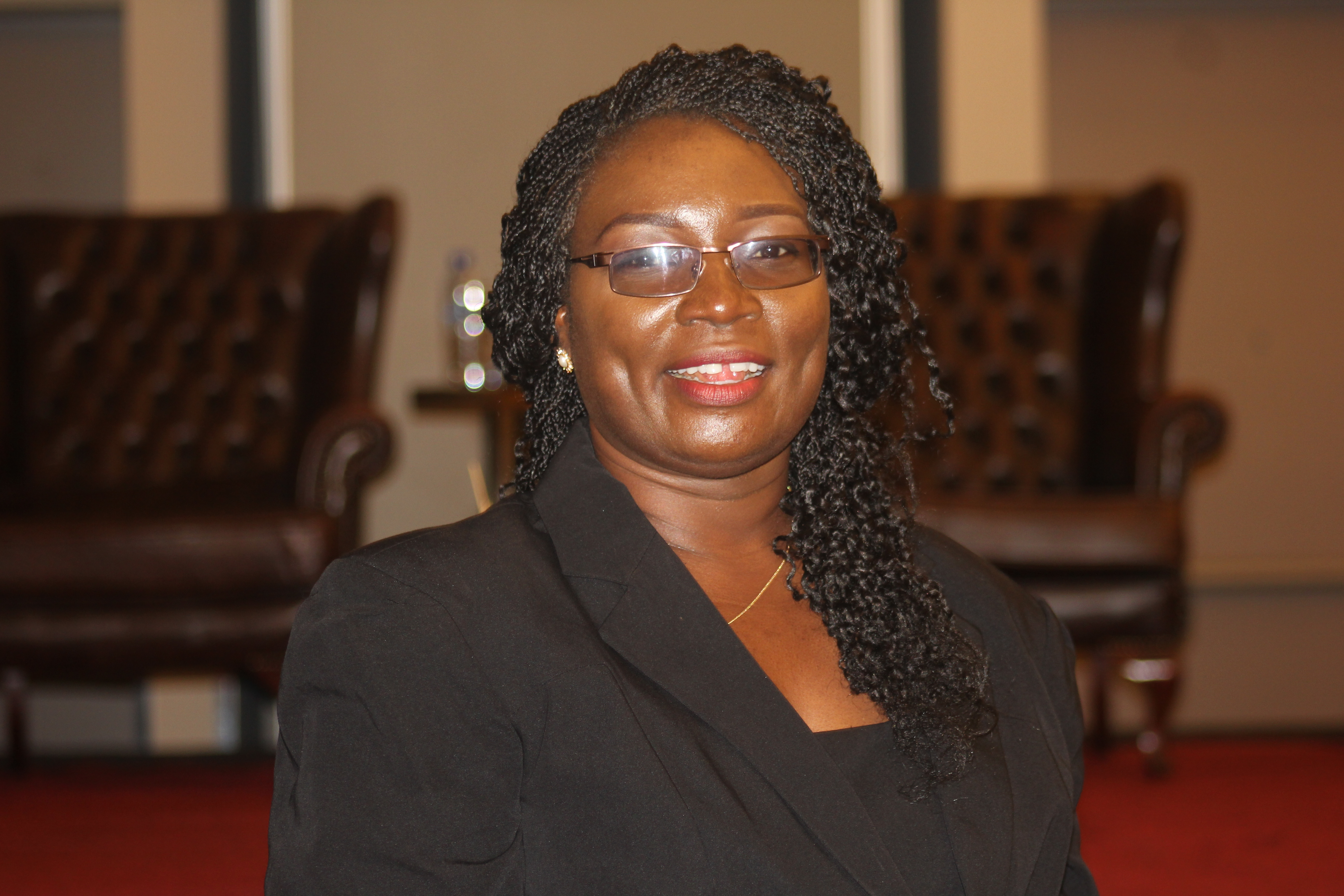

Background information
- Also known as: Diana Akiwumi
- Born: Diana Botchway
- Origin: Accra, Ghana
- Genres: Gospel
- Occupation: Musician
- Years active: 1991

Diana Hopeson (also known as Diana Botchway) is a Ghanaian gospel singer and a former president of the Musicians Union of Ghana. Her contributions to the Ghanaian Art industry won her a National Honors Award, which was presented to her by former president John Agyekum Kufuor in 2007. In March 2021, she was among the Top 30 Most Influential Women in Music by the 3Music Awards Women's Brunch. She was also a GHAMRO board member and also the Chairperson of the Interim Management Board of the Copyright Society of Ghana.

== Early life and education ==
Mrs. Hopeson was born as Diana Botchway on 30 August 1970, in Accra to Francis Arhin and Hannah Amoo, the last of seven children. She attended Winneba Secondary School. After completing her secondary education, she furthered at the University of Ghana, where she studied Theatre Arts. She also attended a needs assessment class at Ghana Institute of Management and Public Administration. In 2019, she graduated from the University of Education, Winneba with a master's degree in Philosophy.

== Marriage ==
She is currently married to Rev Emmanuel Hopeson and they have a child together.

In 1990, Diana Hopeson got married at age 21 to Mr. Reverend Samuel Akiwumi. Mr. Akiwumi, who is now her ex-husband was a pastor at the Assemblies of God, Ghana and once acted as her manager.

In an interview with Jessica on the Traffic Avenue on Citi FM, Diana Hopeson disclosed that her ex-husband was bi-polar hence this led to an abusive marriage. She appeared on the front page of a popular newspaper in Ghana called People and Places. Despite an abusive marriage, the husband loved her so much however, at age 27, she separated from him to protect both parties as he threatened to kill himself and her. She became a single parent for 10 years, during such times she returned to the School of Performing Acts, then went into the mission with the US-based “Youth With A Mission,” for 5 years.

== Career ==
Hopeson released her debut album in 1991. Popularly known as Diana Akiwumi during much of her active career, she has released over ten additional albums throughout her music career.

She is Ghanaian recording and Performing Artiste with nine (9) albums including “If Jesus says yes”, “Ebesimeyie”, “Yeyi w’aye daa”, “Africa America” and “Koso Aba”. Her biggest hit was in 1993 with the song ‘Winner” which won her an ECRAG Award and she was interviewed on BBC.

Between 1993 and 1994 she sold 10 thousand cassettes per month. She started touring in Europe in 1995 and recorded her 'Onyame Aem Se' in Holland in the year 1996. This album has her hit song 'Agyenkwa Hene'.

Her music was recommended for the Billy Graham Evangelistic Network. Diana has travelled extensively as an Artiste, Performing with her band in several concerts including Panafest (Several times in Ghana), Afro Music Festival and MASA in La Cote D’voire, Togo, Nigeria and Anton Philipszaal in The Hague. Diana has represented Ghana at several conferences including the World Music Conference in Tallinn, Estonia in 2011 to speak on Music and Poverty Reduction.

For four years, Hopeson served as the president of the Musicians Union of Ghana after her predecessor Alhaji Sidiku Buari. She left to be trained in Events Management for three months at Hawaii, after leaving MUSIGA.

She also served as the Chairman of the Interim Management Board of the Copyright Society of Ghana (COSGA) and was a board member of the Ghana Music Rights Organization.

In 2018, Diana Hopeson and Rev. Thomas Yawson were celebrated for their contribution and dedication towards the Ghanaian music industry at the 5th edition of GSMTV Gospel Awards held in Minnesota, USA.

In 2021, she was selected to represent Ghana in an international Christmas music project, with Hollywood actor Paul Raci, Bollywood playback singer Jaspinder Narula, and Swiss actress Christina Zurbrügg.

She serves as the current 2nd Vice Chairman of GHAMRO and the CEO of GhMusic Publishing and Management.

== 50th Anniversary Celebrations ==
The former President of the Musicians Union of Ghana (MUSIGA), Diana Hopeson organized year-long activities to commemorate her golden jubilee celebration in the year 2020. The celebrations started on 30 August 2020 which is her birthdate and continues to 27 September 2020 for the launch of her new album titled 'Hope Vol 1'.

Also, she scheduled the launch of an autobiography on 25 October 2020. Other activities are industry seminars and a Christmas pageant. The Golden Jubilee celebrations continues to the year 2021 with activities such as Epiphany, Valentine Special, GHMusic Publishing Artistes on Parade. The climax of it all will be the Women in Creative Arts Honors scheduled for Friday, 23 July 2021.

The 'Hope Volume 1' was launched at the Meaglant Hotel in Accra. Among the distinguished guests available are Bishop Charles Hackman of Fire City Chapel, Mrs. Georgina Nettey of Genet Services, Rev. Dr. Dinah Baah Odoom, Registrar of the Ghana Psychology Council, Ms Lorraine Wright Ceo of Liona Nails, Dr. Emefa Bonsi a lecturer at the Methodist University and University Of Education Winneba, Abena Ruthy, President of Women in Gospel as well as Rev. Dr. Mary Ghansah, Helena Rhabbles, Bernice Offei, Abaawa Connie, Barima Amo, Mr. Jerby Dzokoto, Ceo of Jerbette Productions, Mr. Franklin Eleblu, Preachers, Mercy Sackey, Edinam Bright Davis, Mr & Mrs Kumordzi from New Jersey, Mrs Doris Adanu an educational leadership expert, Rev Dr Thomas Yawson Vice President of Musiga, and Coach Freeman Of Jukebox.

== Awards ==
Year	Event	Award	Result	Ref
1993	Entertainment Critics and Reviewers Association of Ghana (ECRAG)	Best Gospel Music	Won	
1997	King David's Awards	Best Personality	Won	
1997	King David's Awards	Best Female Artiste	Won	
