= Zurbrügg =

Zurbrügg is a German surname originating in Switzerland. Notable people with the surname include:

- Christina Zurbrügg (born 1961), Swiss singer
- Chris Zurbrugg (born 1964), American football player
- Lindsey Zurbrugg (born 1998), American wheelchair basketball player
- Rolf Zurbrügg (born 1971), Swiss ski mountaineer
