= Musicians Union of Ghana =

Union of musicians in Ghana

The Musicians Union of Ghana (MUSIGA) is the umbrella group that unites all musicians in Ghana irrespective of their music genre.

Bice Osei Kuffour(Obour) was the former president of the Musicians Union of Ghana (MUSIGA). He was elected on August 18, 2011, in Tamale in the Northern Region of the country. The other candidates were Gyedu-Blay Ambolley, Nana Tuffour and Willi Roi.

Before Obour, Diana Hopeson served as the MUSIGA president between 2007 and 2011.

== Controversy ==
In 2019, the union was dragged to court by Ras Caleb Appiah-Levi, who served as the Accra Regional Chairman of MUSIGA, after alleging some irregularities concerning the electoral process. A High Court in Accra placed an interim injunction on the national elections by the union.

Due to that Bessa Simons was appointed and confirmed at a meeting on Friday, August 30 to lead the body until the National Executive Elections take place. The National Executive Council (NEC) also appointed former Second Vice President, Rev. Dr Thomas Yawson as Acting First Vice President of MUSIGA in this interim period.

Ras Caleb Appiah-Levi later agreed for the case to be withdrawn against the union from court to an alternative dispute resolution before they could have their elections. The election was later scheduled for January 13, 2022 but got postponed again to February 23, 2022 to enable enough preparations for the elections of new executives to lead the association for the next four years. Even though the date was scheduled, the election did not come off in 2022.

The National Executive Council (NEC) of the Musicians Union of Ghana (MUSIGA) announced on Friday, March 17, 2022 that the union will be going to the polls on Tuesday, August 8, 2023. This is the date proposed by NEC for the national and regional elections after almost four years of court injunctions, postponements and internal rifts.

The acting president of the Musicians Union of Ghana (MUSIGA), Bessa Simons said he has no role to play in the umping elections of Musicians Union of Ghana slated for Tuesday, August 8. Bessa Simons told Graphic Showbiz that his present role as the acting President of MUSIGA was to fill a vacuum and to ensure the continuous administration of the union. Bessa Simons, Ras Caleb Appiah-Levi and Deborah Freeman are the candidates competing to be President of MUSIGA in the upcoming elections.

In July 2023, MUSIGA warned its members against breaking away from the mother body. The Leadership of MUSIGA has described moves by certain individuals to form a new music union, NEW MUSIGHA as unfortunate. Due to the issues and controversies in the MUSIGA, certain individuals want to form a new music union, NEW MUSIGHA. In a statement issued on June 29, 2023 and signed by the Acting MUSIGA President, Bessa Simons, He said such moves are a ploy to sow discord and confusion within the ranks of the membership of MUSIGA. Due to this, the leadership of MUSIGA is threatening to expel any members who join the alleged NEW MUSIGHA before the organization’s elections on August 8, 2023.

The upcoming Musicians Union of Ghana (MUSIGA) elections, which were scheduled to take place on Tuesday, August 8, 2023, have been placed on hold after an Accra High Court imposed an interlocutory injunction. In their petition, the plaintiffs, Doe Kwablah Seyenam Nyamadi and Frederick Van Dyk, alleged that MUSIGA and its current executives have failed to comply with the union’s constitution by failing to provide comprehensive financial accounts. They argued that this failure to account for MUSIGA’s finances renders the union ineligible to conduct elections and transfer authority to a new executive. Due to this the election was withheld. Peter Marfo, the Chairman of the MUSIGA Election Committee, apologised for any inconvenience the injunction may have caused to MUSIGA’s esteemed members, aspirants, and the union.

== History and Establishment ==
On December 9, 1975, MUSIGA was founded with the primary objective of uniting musicians under a single organization to safeguard their rights, advance their interests, and advance the Ghanaian music business. Since the group's official recognition by the Ghanaian government, it has been crucial in assisting musicians and developing the music industry.

- Supporting musicians' rights and welfare: MUSIGA stands up for musicians' interests, ensuring that their rights are upheld and that they are treated fairly within the music business.
- Social responsibility and community involvement: Using music as a tool for constructive social change and growth, MUSIGA participates in social responsibility projects and community initiatives.
- In order to empower artists, improve their skills, and prepare them for success in the industry, the group offers training, workshops, and resources.
- The preservation of Ghana's musical history is a priority for MUSIGA, which also works to commemorate and uphold traditional music and other forms of cultural expression.

== Election ==
After several years of court issues, the election of new president for MUSIGA for 2023 to 2027 has been elected. He is in the person of Bessa Simon, a Veteran Highlife musician. Bessa, who had been the Acting MUSIGA president since Bice Osei Kuffour resigned polled a total of 324 votes, with Ras Caleb securing 66 votes. The election, which took place in all the regions, had a good turnout of MUSIGA members who came in to exercise their rights to vote. Eddie Eyison was also elected as national treasurer.

== Support and Funding ==
In October 2025, the Ga Mantse, His Royal Majesty King Tackie Teiko Tsuru II, promised to support the union as part of its golden jubilee celebration.

== See also ==
- Ghana Music Rights Organization
