= Bice Osei Kuffour =

Ghanaian hiplife musician

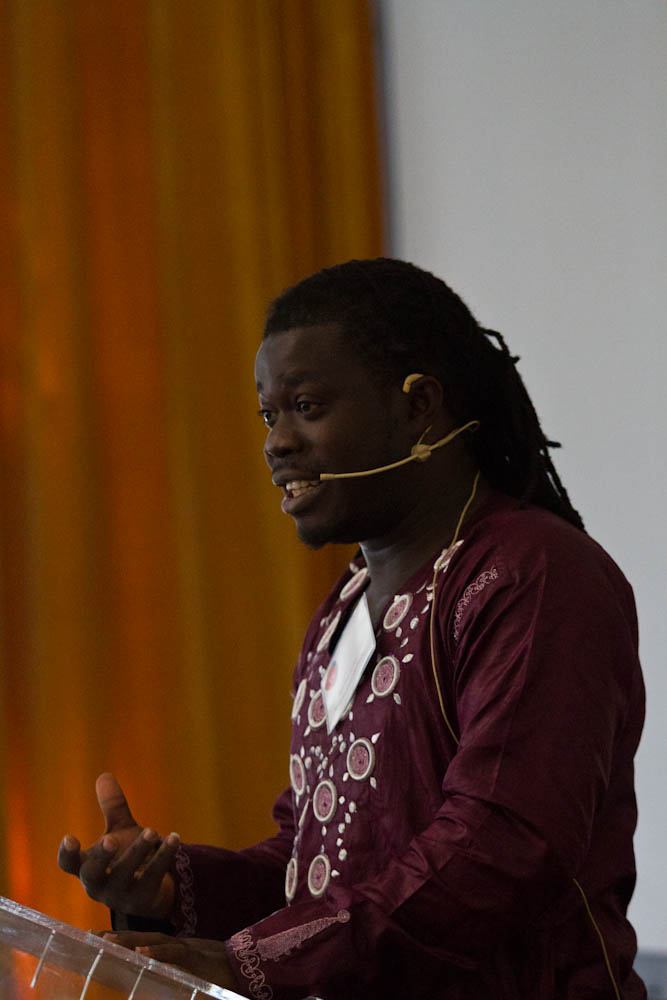
Bice Osei Kuffour

Bice Osei Kuffour (born 17 November 1981) is a Ghanaian hiplife musician, known popularly by the name Obour, which means "stone" in the Akan language. He is the immediate past president of the Musicians Union of Ghana, an umbrella group that unites all musicians in Ghana irrespective of genre. Bice Osei Kuffour contested the NPP primaries elections in the Asante Akyem South constituency as a parliamentary candidate. He was later appointed as secretary to the NPP 2020 Campaign Ashanti Region Advertising Committee. Obour is an alumnus of the University of Ghana, the US International Visitor Leadership Programme, Aspen Global Leadership Network, and African Leadership Initiative of West Africa. He was the youngest recipient of the State Grand Medal Honour given by President J. A Kufuor in 2008. He is a social activist who doubles as a National Road Safety Ambassador; W.H.O Tuberculosis Ambassador British Council & Forest Commission of Ghana Climate Change Ambassador. He is president and Founder of the Christiana Addo Memorial Foundation which promotes education, sanitation, personal hygiene, and youth empowerment in Asante Akyem, and on December 22, 2021 was appointed by President Nana Akufo-Addo, as the Acting Managing Director of Ghana Post.

== Life and career ==
Obour was born at "Braha Bebu Me" (Dekyemenso) in the Ashanti Region on 7 November 1981, to Christiana Addo and Reverend B. O. Kuffour. At the age of six, Obour played many types of drums, especially the Atumpan, in the Juaso-Ashanti Akyem chief's palace where his father used to preside. Obour was educated at the State Experimental School (Kumasi), the Soul Clinic School (Accra), Garison Junior Secondary School (Burma Camp) and Mfantsipim School (Cape Coast).

After finishing secondary school, Obour solicited help from his London-based cousin, J. Amano, who connected him with his personal Soul Records label. He subsequently released Atentenben which won three awards for Soul Records at the Ghana Music Awards in 2002, including Video of the year. This, and other songs by the label, led to Soul Records being awarded with Record Label of the Year. The same video won the Best at Our Music Awards (OMA) in 2002.

He was already a celebrity by the time he entered the University of Ghana in 2002 to study Sociology and Music, as a member of Commonwealth Hall (Vandal City). His second album, entitled Dondo, was led by the track "Nana Obour", which had earlier featured on Soul Records′ Adakamo compilation album. Dondo also featured such classic tunes as "Mesoodae" and "Palm Wine". "Nana Obour" won the Best Video at both Ghana Music Awards and Ghana Music Awards UK in 2003.

In 2005, he established a pub in Osu and a music production company called Family Tree Entertainment.

Obour has led several national campaigns because of his positive and educative lyrics. He won five awards at the 2005 Ghana Music Awards. His albums include Atentenben, Akademua, Dondo, Atumpan, President Obour and Fontomfrom. He made a duet album with A. B. Crentsil entitled The Best of the Lifes. Obour's 2004 album Obour.com produced the hit single "Konkontiba". He released a socially conscious album and project, One Ghana Peace Project/Obour for President, ahead of the 2008 general elections. He went on to embark on a Nationwide Peace Campaign. Obour was selected among 12 other emerging leaders by The African Leadership Initiative to pursue training with the Aspen Global Leadership Network.

He was appointed a climate change ambassador by the British Council and served in that capacity from 2008 till 2010.

He is the immediate past president of the Musicians Union of Ghana, the National Tuberculosis Ambassador of Ghana, Road Safety Ambassador, Executive icon of Youth Icons Africa and a Climate Change Champion for the British Council. He serves on several executive and advisory boards, including the executive committee of the International Federation of Musicians, University of Ghana School of Performing Arts advisory board, National Commission on Culture, National Folklore board and the Ghana Music Rights Organisation board. He was the executive director for the Ghana Tourism Booster Project from 2016 to 2017.

In 2017, Obour and his siblings established the Christiana Addo Memorial Foundation to help the people in the Asante Akyem South constituency of the Ashanti Region. He became more involved in the activities of the constituency as Chiefs and several youth groups called on him to consider representing them as their Member of Parliament.

In January 2021, he cut off his dreadlocks which he had grown for almost 20 years. The dreadlocks which were longer than waist length were removed because he was taking a break from music and needed a new look to rebrand himself.

== Political career ==
Obour's political ambitions started in January 2020 when he publicly announced his bid for the parliamentary primaries of the New Patriotic Party(NPP). He contested to be choose as NPP candidate for the Asante Akim South constituency but was beaten by the incumbent MP for the constituency, Kwaku Asante Boateng. Obour received 32.86% (280 votes), while Mr. Boateng won with 61.27% (522 votes).

In the 2024 NPP parliamentary primaries, incumbent MP Kwaku Asante Boateng secured victory again over the former president of MUSIGA.

== Managing Director at GhanaPost ==
Bice Osei Kuffour (Obour) was appointed by the President of Ghana Nana Akufo-Addo on December 22, 2021, as the Acting Managing Director of GhanaPost.
