= Sound of Metal =

2019 film by Darius Marder

- Official release poster
- Directed by: Darius Marder
- Screenplay by: Darius Marder; Abraham Marder
- Story by: Darius Marder; Derek Cianfrance
- Produced by: Bill Benz; Kathy Benz; Bert Hamelinck; Sacha Ben Harroche
- Starring: Riz Ahmed; Olivia Cooke; Paul Raci; Lauren Ridloff; Mathieu Amalric
- Cinematography: Daniël Bouquet
- Edited by: Mikkel E. G. Nielsen
- Music by: Abraham Marder; Nicolas Becker
- Production companies: Caviar; Ward Four; Flat 7 Productions
- Distributed by: Amazon Studios
- Release dates: September 6, 2019 (TIFF); November 20, 2020 (United States)
- Running time: 120 minutes
- Country: United States
- Languages: American Sign Language; English
- Budget: $5.4 million
- Box office: $516,520

Sound of Metal is a 2019 American drama film directed by Darius Marder, who co-wrote the story with Derek Cianfrance before co-writing the screenplay with his brother Abraham Marder. It stars Riz Ahmed as a metal drummer who loses his hearing. The cast also includes Olivia Cooke, Paul Raci, Lauren Ridloff, and Mathieu Amalric.

Sound of Metal had its world premiere in the Platform Prize program at the 2019 Toronto International Film Festival on September 6, 2019. Amazon Studios released the film in theaters on November 20, 2020, and on Amazon Prime Video on December 4.

The film was critically acclaimed, with particular praise for the performances of Ahmed and Raci, the sound design, the editing, direction, and screenplay. It was listed on 52 film critics' top-ten lists for 2020. At the 93rd Academy Awards, it was nominated for Best Picture, Best Original Screenplay, Best Actor (Ahmed) and Best Supporting Actor (Raci), and won for Best Sound and Best Film Editing.

== Plot ==
Ruben Stone plays drums in the avant-garde metal duo Blackgammon, with his singer girlfriend, Lou. They live in an RV and tour the United States performing gigs. Ruben begins to lose his hearing, so seeks a diagnosis in a pharmacy. He is referred to a doctor, who finds that Ruben has lost most of his hearing and that the rest will deteriorate rapidly. Although cochlear implants may benefit him, insurance does not cover the high cost. The doctor suggests that Ruben eliminate all exposure to loud noises and undergo further testing, but Ruben continues to perform.

Lou wants him to stop performing for his safety, but Ruben wants to continue. She is also concerned about his sobriety, as he is a recovering drug addict. They call his sponsor, Hector, who finds a rural shelter for deaf recovering addicts run by a man named Joe, a recovering alcoholic who lost his hearing in the Vietnam War. Ruben leaves with Lou because they will not let her live there with him, and he only wants the implants. Anxious for his well-being, Lou leaves and persuades Ruben to return to the shelter.

Ruben meets the other members of the shelter, attends meetings, and settles into his new life. He is introduced to schoolteacher Diane and the children in her class and learns American Sign Language. Joe tasks Ruben with writing and sitting peacefully in his study in an effort to make him comfortable with the silence, which he initially rejects but slowly begins to participate in. Ruben joins Diane's class and connects with the children and the rest of the community. He gives the children and Diane drumming lessons.

Joe invites Ruben to stay as an employee of the community. Ruben illicitly uses Joe's office computer to follow Lou's activities and learns she is performing music in Paris. He has his friend Jenn sell his drums and other music equipment, then he sells his RV, using the money for cochlear implant surgery.

Ruben asks Joe to loan him money to buy back his RV while he awaits the activation of the implants. Joe refuses, saying that he is behaving like an addict. He asks Ruben if he has experienced any moments of stillness during his time in his study, before asking him to leave the community, as it is founded on the belief that deafness is not a handicap.

Ruben has his implants activated but is disappointed by their distorted sound. He flies to Paris to meet Lou at the home of her wealthy father, Richard. Richard confides in Ruben that though he initially disliked him, he recognizes that Ruben made Lou happy. She has settled into her new lifestyle and has ceased self-harming. At a party, Lou and Richard perform a duet; Ruben's perception of the sound is distorted by the implants.

When Ruben tells Lou he wants to return to their music, she responds with interest but begins scratching her arms. Realizing that they are not compatible, he tells her all is well and that she saved his life. Lou tells him that he saved hers too. The next morning, Ruben takes his things and leaves while she sleeps. In a park, the ringing of a church bell is distorted by his implants; Ruben removes his processors and sits in silence, finally experiencing the moment of stillness Joe talked about.

== Cast ==
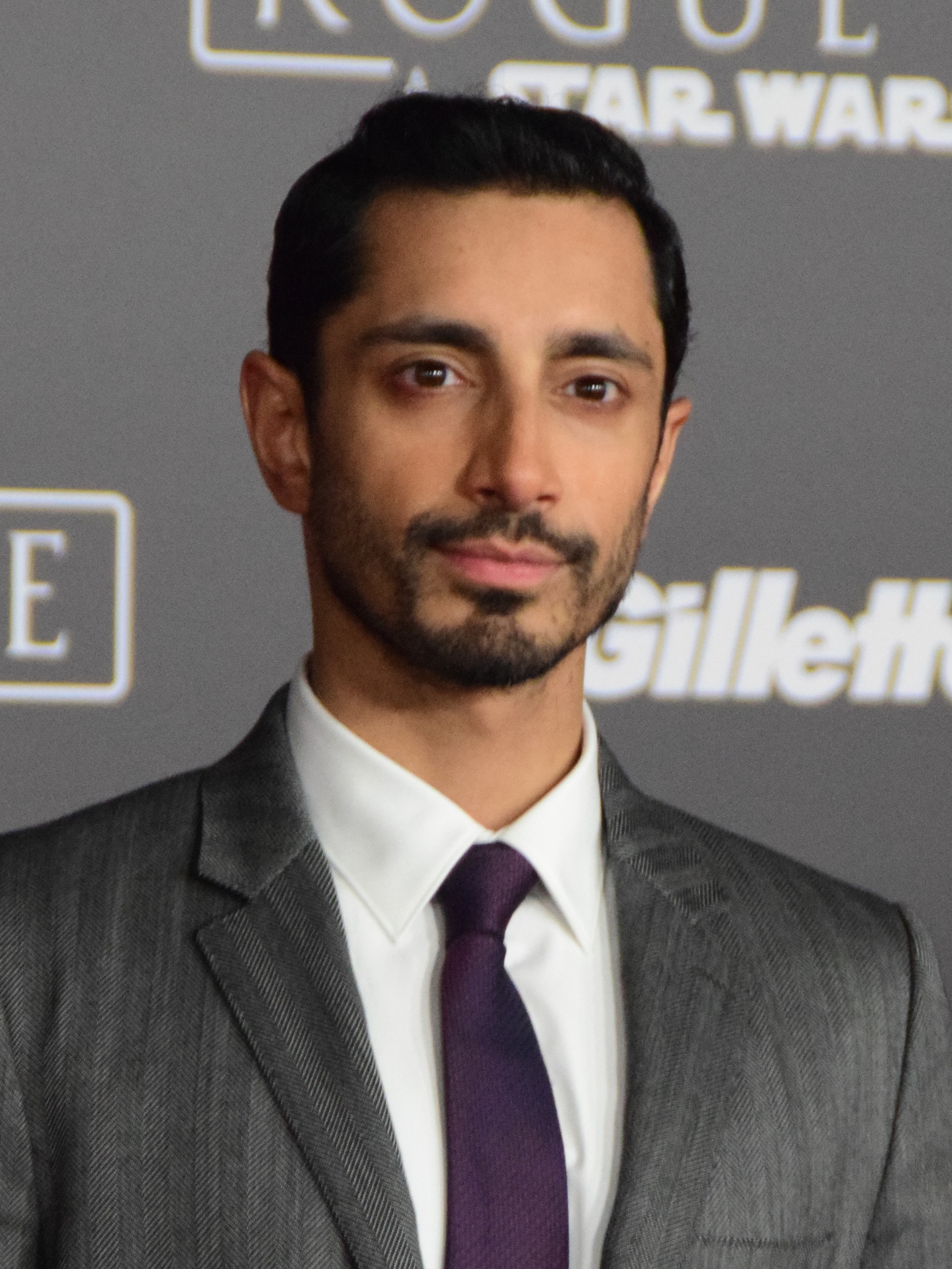
Riz Ahmed portrayed Ruben Stone

- Riz Ahmed as Ruben Stone, a drummer who loses his hearing
- Olivia Cooke as Louise "Lou" Berger, Ruben's girlfriend
- Paul Raci as Joe, a late-deafened and recovering alcoholic who runs a shelter for deaf recovering addicts
- Lauren Ridloff as Diane, a teacher who helps Ruben learn American Sign Language
- Mathieu Amalric as Richard Berger, Lou's father
- Chris Perfetti as Harlan
- Michael Tow as the pharmacist

== Production ==
Sound of Metal is directed by Darius Marder, who wrote the story with Derek Cianfrance and who also wrote the screenplay with his brother Abraham Marder. The film originated as the unfinished Cianfrance project Metalhead, which centers on a metal drummer who suddenly becomes deaf. The film featured the members of the band Jucifer portraying themselves. However, the project was later scrapped, until Cianfrance's friend Darius Marder took it up. In January 2016, Dakota Johnson and Matthias Schoenaerts joined the cast of the film, with Marder directing. In July 2018, Riz Ahmed and Olivia Cooke joined the cast of the film, replacing Johnson and Schoenaerts, alongside Mathieu Amalric. Before the casting, Marder had spent 13 years vetting actors who would match his commitment to the film.

Many of the actors were recruited from the deaf community. For eight months, Ahmed prepared for the film by spending two hours a day learning American Sign Language, two hours a day in drum lessons, two hours a day with a personal trainer and the remainder with his acting coach. Marder wanted Ahmed to "trust his instincts" and did not allow him to review dailies of his performance or script analysis.

Sound of Metal was shot in 24 non-consecutive days from early to late 2018. Marder operated on a limited budget, and shot only two takes per scene. The film was shot in the Greater Boston area, primarily in Ipswich, Massachusetts. However, other scenes were shot in Boston, Lynn, Cambridge, Danvers, Framingham, Lawrence, Malden, Rowley, and Topsfield. Filming also took place in Antwerp, Belgium.

== Release ==
Sound of Metal had its world premiere in the Platform Prize program at the 2019 Toronto International Film Festival on September 6, 2019. Nearly a week later, Amazon Studios acquired U.S. distribution rights to the film, which also interested Neon among others. It was originally scheduled to be released on August 14, 2020, before being postponed due to the COVID-19 pandemic. It was released theatrically on November 20, 2020, and began streaming on Amazon Prime Video on December 4, 2020. Sound of Metal became a part of the Criterion Collection, with a 4K Ultra HD, Blu-ray and DVD released on September 27, 2022.

== Critical reception ==
On review aggregator Rotten Tomatoes, the film holds an approval rating of 97% based on 281 reviews, with an average of 8.2/10. The site's critics consensus reads: "An evocative look at the experiences of the deaf community, Sound of Metal is brought to life by Riz Ahmed's passionate performance." On Metacritic, the film has a weighted average score of 82 out of 100, based on 36 critics, indicating "universal acclaim".

Sound of Metal received mostly positive reviews from critics. Clarisse Loughrey of The Independent gave the film four stars out of five and praised Marder's direction and Ahmed's performance. Jeannette Catsoulis of The New York Times found the film "underwritten and dramatically muted" but praised Ahmed's performance and Nicolas Becker's sound design. Mark Kermode of The Guardian praised the "astonishing verisimilitude" of the direction and called Ahmed's performance the best of his career. Peter Bradshaw, also writing for The Guardian, credited Ahmed with giving "the film energy and point" but was critical of other aspects, writing that "[the story] perhaps tries to do too much", and that it "telescopes a long story into just a few months." Empire critic Ian Freer praised the sound design and called the film a "powerful but sensitive exploration of a so-called disability that challenges perceptions and assumptions about loss of hearing in thoughtful but provocative ways." Rolling Stone journalist David Fear wrote that the film "immerses you in a noiseless world — but it's the star that makes it speak volumes loudly and clearly". Although enthusiastic about many aspects of the film, metal-themed website The Pit criticized the film's portrayal of metal music, stating that it is "the latest in a long line of Hollywood movies to use metal as a lifestyle that serious characters grow out of."

At the end of the year, Sound of Metal appeared on 52 film critics' top-ten lists for 2020 as the ninth highest-ranked film, including first place on five lists and second place on seven lists.

In 2025, it was one of the films voted for the "Readers' Choice" edition of The New York Times' list of "The 100 Best Movies of the 21st Century," finishing at number 236.

== Accolades ==
Award	Date of ceremony	Category	Recipient(s)	Result	Ref.
AACTA Awards	March 5, 2021	Best International Actor	Riz Ahmed	Nominated	
Academy Awards	April 25, 2021	Best Picture	Bert Hamelinck & Sacha Ben Harroche	Nominated	
Academy Awards	April 25, 2021	Best Actor	Riz Ahmed	Nominated	
Academy Awards	April 25, 2021	Best Supporting Actor	Paul Raci	Nominated	
Academy Awards	April 25, 2021	Best Original Screenplay	Darius Marder, Abraham Marder & Derek Cianfrance	Nominated	
Academy Awards	April 25, 2021	Best Film Editing	Mikkel E. G. Nielsen	Won	
Academy Awards	April 25, 2021	Best Sound	Nicolas Becker, Jaime Baksht, Michelle Couttolenc, Carlos Cortés & Phillip Bladh	Won	
Alliance of Women Film Journalists	January 4, 2021	Best Actor	Riz Ahmed	Nominated	
American Cinema Editors Awards	April 17, 2021	Best Edited Feature Film (Dramatic)	Mikkel E. G. Nielsen	Nominated	
American Film Institute Awards	February 26, 2021	Top 10 Movies of the Year	Sound of Metal	Won	
Austin Film Critics Association	March 19, 2021	Best Actor	Riz Ahmed	Won	
Austin Film Critics Association	March 19, 2021	Best Supporting Actor	Paul Raci	Nominated	
Austin Film Critics Association	March 19, 2021	Best Original Screenplay	Darius Marder, Abraham Marder & Derek Cianfrance	Nominated	
Austin Film Critics Association	March 19, 2021	Best Editing	Mikkel E. G. Nielsen	Nominated	
British Academy Film Awards	April 11, 2021	Best Actor	Riz Ahmed	Nominated	
British Academy Film Awards	April 11, 2021	Best Supporting Actor	Paul Raci	Nominated	
British Academy Film Awards	April 11, 2021	Best Editing	Mikkel E. G. Nielsen	Won	
British Academy Film Awards	April 11, 2021	Best Sound	Jaime Baksht, Nicolas Becker, Phillip Bladh, Carlos Cortés Navarrete & Michelle Couttolenc	Won	
Boston Society of Film Critics Awards	December 13, 2020	Best Actor	Riz Ahmed	Runner-up	
Boston Society of Film Critics Awards	December 13, 2020	Best Supporting Actor	Paul Raci	Won	
Casting Society of America	April 15, 2021	Low Budget – Comedy or Drama	Susan Shopmaker, Angela Peri (Location Casting), Lisa Lobel (Location Casting), Emily Fleischer (Associate)	Nominated	
Chicago Film Critics Association	December 21, 2020	Best Actor	Riz Ahmed	Nominated	
Chicago Film Critics Association	December 21, 2020	Best Supporting Actor	Paul Raci	Won	
Cinema Audio Society Awards	April 17, 2021	Motion Picture – Live Action	Phillip Bladh, Nicolas Becker, Jaime Baksht, Michelle Couttolenc, Carlos Cortés Navarrette & Kari Vähäkuopus	Won	
Critics' Choice Movie Awards	March 7, 2021	Best Picture	Sound of Metal	Nominated	
Critics' Choice Movie Awards	March 7, 2021	Best Actor	Riz Ahmed	Nominated	
Critics' Choice Movie Awards	March 7, 2021	Best Supporting Actor	Paul Raci	Nominated	
Critics' Choice Movie Awards	March 7, 2021	Best Original Screenplay	Darius Marder & Abraham Marder	Nominated	
Critics' Choice Movie Awards	March 7, 2021	Best Editing	Mikkel E. G. Nielsen	Won	
Dallas–Fort Worth Film Critics Association	February 10, 2021	Best Picture	Sound of Metal	Runner-up	
Dallas–Fort Worth Film Critics Association	February 10, 2021	Best Actor	Riz Ahmed	Runner-up	
Dallas–Fort Worth Film Critics Association	February 10, 2021	Best Supporting Actor	Paul Raci	Runner-up	
Detroit Film Critics Society	March 8, 2021	Best Picture	Sound of Metal	Nominated	
Detroit Film Critics Society	March 8, 2021	Best Actor	Riz Ahmed	Nominated	
Detroit Film Critics Society	March 8, 2021	Best Supporting Actor	Paul Raci	Nominated	
Detroit Film Critics Society	March 8, 2021	Best Original Screenplay	Sound of Metal	Nominated	
Detroit Film Critics Society	March 8, 2021	Best Use of Music/Sound	Sound of Metal	Won	
Directors Guild of America Awards	April 10, 2021	Outstanding Directing – First-Time Feature Film	Darius Marder	Won	
Gotham Independent Film Awards	January 11, 2021	Best Actor	Riz Ahmed	Won	
Georgia Film Critics Association	March 12, 2021	Best Picture	Sound of Metal	Nominated	
Georgia Film Critics Association	March 12, 2021	Best Director	Darius Marder	Nominated	
Georgia Film Critics Association	March 12, 2021	Best Actor	Riz Ahmed	Won	
Georgia Film Critics Association	March 12, 2021	Best Supporting Actor	Paul Raci	Won	
Georgia Film Critics Association	March 12, 2021	Best Original Screenplay	Darius Marder & Abraham Marder	Nominated	
Georgia Film Critics Association	March 12, 2021	Best Original Song	Abraham Marder	Nominated	
Golden Globe Awards	February 28, 2021	Best Actor – Motion Picture Drama	Riz Ahmed	Nominated	
Hollywood Critics Association	March 5, 2021	Best Picture	Sound of Metal	Nominated	
Hollywood Critics Association	March 5, 2021	Best Actor	Riz Ahmed	Nominated	
Hollywood Critics Association	March 5, 2021	Best Supporting Actor	Paul Raci	Won	
Hollywood Critics Association	March 5, 2021	Best Breakthrough Actor	Paul Raci	Won	
Hollywood Critics Association	March 5, 2021	Best Male Director	Darius Marder	Won	
Hollywood Critics Association	March 5, 2021	Best Original Screenplay	Darius Marder & Abraham Marder	Nominated	
Hollywood Critics Association	March 5, 2021	Best First Feature	Darius Marder	Nominated	
Houston Film Critics Society	January 18, 2021	Best Actor	Riz Ahmed	Won	
Houston Film Critics Society	January 18, 2021	Outstanding Cinematic Achievement	Sound of Metal (for its Immersive Sound Design)	Won	
Independent Spirit Awards	April 22, 2021	Best First Feature	Sound of Metal	Won	
Independent Spirit Awards	April 22, 2021	Best Male Lead	Riz Ahmed	Won	
Independent Spirit Awards	April 22, 2021	Best Supporting Male	Paul Raci	Won	
IndieWire Critics Poll	December 14, 2020	Best Performance	Riz Ahmed	Won	
London Film Critics' Circle	2021	Actor of the Year	Riz Ahmed	Nominated	
London Film Critics' Circle	2021	Technical Achievement	Nicolas Becker (Sound Design)	Nominated	
London Film Critics' Circle	2021	British/Irish Actor of the Year (for body of work)	Riz Ahmed	Won	
Los Angeles Film Critics Association	December 20, 2020	Best Actor	Riz Ahmed	Runner-up	
Los Angeles Film Critics Association	December 20, 2020	Best Supporting Actor	Paul Raci	Runner-up	
Miami International Film Festival	March 6, 2021	Impact Award	Riz Ahmed	Won	
Motion Picture Sound Editors	April 16, 2021	Outstanding Achievement in Sound Editing – Feature Underscore	Carolina Santana, Nicolas Becker & Abraham Marder	Nominated	
Motion Picture Sound Editors	April 16, 2021	Outstanding Achievement in Sound Editing – Feature Dialogue / ADR	Nicolas Becker, Carolina Santana & Michelle Couttolenc	Nominated	
Motion Picture Sound Editors	April 16, 2021	Outstanding Achievement in Sound Editing – Feature Effects / Foley	Nicolas Becker, Carolina Santana, Pietu Korhonen & Heikki Kossi	Nominated	
National Board of Review	January 26, 2021	Best Actor	Riz Ahmed	Won	
National Board of Review	January 26, 2021	Best Supporting Actor	Paul Raci	Won	
National Board of Review	January 26, 2021	Top 10 Films of 2020	Sound of Metal	Won	
National Society of Film Critics	January 9, 2021	Best Actor	Riz Ahmed	Runner-up	
National Society of Film Critics	January 9, 2021	Best Supporting Actor	Paul Raci	Won	
New York Film Critics Online	January 26, 2021	Best Actor	Riz Ahmed	Won	
Online Film Critics Society	January 25, 2021	Best Picture	Sound of Metal	Nominated	
Online Film Critics Society	January 25, 2021	Best Actor	Riz Ahmed	Nominated	
Online Film Critics Society	January 25, 2021	Best Supporting Actor	Paul Raci	Nominated	
Online Film Critics Society	January 25, 2021	Best Debut Feature	Darius Marder	Nominated	
Online Film Critics Society	January 25, 2021	Technical Achievement Award	Sound of Metal – Sound Design	Won	
Palm Springs International Film Festival	February 26, 2021	Desert Palm Achievement Award, Actor	Riz Ahmed	Won	
Producers Guild of America Awards	March 24, 2021	Best Theatrical Motion Picture	Bert Hamelinck & Sacha Ben Harroche	Nominated	
San Diego Film Critics Society	January 11, 2021	Best Picture	Sound of Metal	Runner-up	
San Diego Film Critics Society	January 11, 2021	Best Director	Darius Marder	Nominated	
San Diego Film Critics Society	January 11, 2021	Best Actor	Riz Ahmed	Won	
San Diego Film Critics Society	January 11, 2021	Best Supporting Actor	Paul Raci	Won	
San Diego Film Critics Society	January 11, 2021	Best Supporting Actress	Olivia Cooke	Nominated	
San Diego Film Critics Society	January 11, 2021	Best Original Screenplay	Darius Marder, Abraham Marder & Derek Cianfrance	Runner-up	
San Diego Film Critics Society	January 11, 2021	Breakthrough Artist	Riz Ahmed	Runner-up	
San Diego Film Critics Society	January 11, 2021	Best Use of Music	Sound of Metal	Nominated	
San Francisco Bay Area Film Critics Circle	2021	Best Actor	Riz Ahmed	Nominated	
San Francisco Bay Area Film Critics Circle	2021	Best Supporting Actor	Paul Raci	Won	
Santa Barbara International Film Festival	April 3, 2021	Virtuosos Award	Riz Ahmed	Won	
Santa Barbara International Film Festival	April 3, 2021	Variety Artisans Award	Nicolas Becker	Won	
Satellite Awards	February 15, 2021	Best Motion Picture – Drama	Sound of Metal	Nominated	
Satellite Awards	February 15, 2021	Best Director	Darius Marder	Nominated	
Satellite Awards	February 15, 2021	Best Actor in a Motion Picture – Drama	Riz Ahmed	Won	
Satellite Awards	February 15, 2021	Best Sound (Editing and Mixing)	Phillip Bladh, Nicolas Becker, Jaime Baksht, Michelle Couttolenc, Carlos Cortés & Carolina Santana	Won	
Screen Actors Guild Awards	April 4, 2021	Outstanding Performance by a Male Actor in a Leading Role	Riz Ahmed	Nominated	
Seattle Film Critics Society	February 15, 2021	Best Actor	Riz Ahmed	Won	
Seattle Film Critics Society	February 15, 2021	Best Actor in a Supporting Role	Paul Raci	Nominated	
Seattle Film Critics Society	February 15, 2021	Best Picture of the Year	Sound of Metal	Nominated	
Set Decorators Society of America Awards	March 31, 2021	Best Achievement in Décor/Design of a Contemporary Feature Film	Tara Pavoni and Jeremy Woodward	Nominated	
St. Louis Film Critics Association	January 28, 2021	Best Actor	Riz Ahmed	Nominated	
St. Louis Film Critics Association	January 28, 2021	Best Supporting Actor	Paul Raci	Won	
Toronto Film Critics Association	February 7, 2021	Best Actor	Riz Ahmed	Won	
Toronto Film Critics Association	February 7, 2021	Best Supporting Actor	Paul Raci	Runner-up	
Toronto Film Critics Association	February 7, 2021	Best Screenplay	Sound of Metal	Runner-up	
Washington D.C. Area Film Critics Association	February 8, 2021	Best Actor	Riz Ahmed	Nominated	
Washington D.C. Area Film Critics Association	February 8, 2021	Best Supporting Actor	Paul Raci	Nominated	
Washington D.C. Area Film Critics Association	February 8, 2021	Best Original Screenplay	Darius Marder, Abraham Marder & Derek Cianfrance	Nominated	
Washington D.C. Area Film Critics Association	February 8, 2021	Best Editing	Mikkel E. G. Nielsen	Nominated	
Writers Guild of America Awards	March 21, 2021	Best Original Screenplay	Darius Marder & Abraham Marder; story by Darius Marder & Derek Cianfrance	Nominated	
Zurich Film Festival	October 6, 2019	Best Film – International Feature	Sound of Metal	Won	

== See also ==
- List of actors nominated for Academy Awards for non-English performances
- List of films featuring the deaf and hard of hearing
- Safe listening
- Sudden hearing loss
