= Ghana Post =

Ghanaian postal service provider

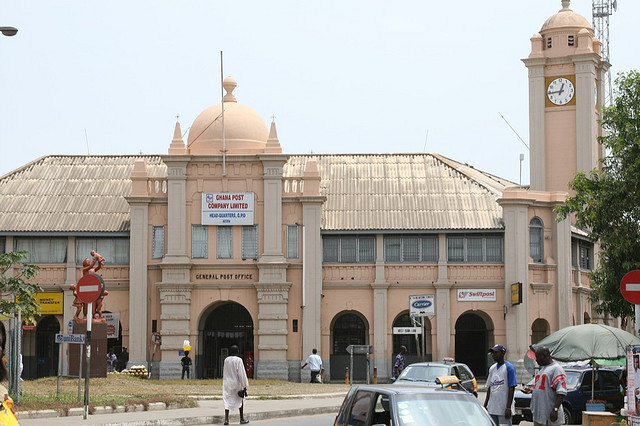
- General Post Office, Central Accra

Agency overview
- Formed: 1974
- Employees: 1,650 (December 2016)
- Agency executive: Bice Osei Kuffour, Managing Director
- Website: ghanapost.com.gh

Ghana Post (also known as Ghana Post Company Limited) is a government-owned corporation responsible for postal service in Ghana and a member of the West African Postal Conference.

The current Managing Director is Bice Osei Kuffour, popularly known as Obour with Kwaku Tabi Amponsah as his deputy. He succeeded James Kwofie as the Managing Director.

== History ==
Ghana Post began in 1854 as the Post and Telecommunications Department of the Colonial Administration. It was transformed into a corporation in 1974 following the promulgation of the NRC Decree 311 of 1974.

The Telecommunications Division was separated from the corporation in 1993, and the remaining Postal Division was renamed the Ghana Postal Services Corporation, with its enabling legislation being Act 505 of 1995. In 1995, the corporation was incorporated under the Companies' Code (Act 179) in accordance with the Statutory Corporations (Conversion to Companies) Act 1993 (Act 461), which required certain state-owned enterprises to become limited liability companies. The organisation subsequently adopted its current name, Ghana Post Company Limited.

The company holds a legal monopoly over the provision of the universal postal service, specifically for letters weighing below 100 grams.

The company provides postal, courier, retail, agency, and financial services to customers on a commercial basis.

== Management ==
The Ghana Post Company Limited is managed by a seven-member Board of Directors. People on the board are;

1. George Afedzi Hayford (Chairman),
2. Bice Osei Kuffour (Managing Director),
3. Yiadom Boakye Kessie (Member),
4. Abena Durowaa Mensah (Member),
5. Frederick Akuffo-Gyimah (Member),
6. Alfred Nii-Nortey Nortey (Member), and
7. Michael Omari Wadie (Member).

== Awards ==
Some awards garnered include;

- Best EMS Call Centre 2017 by the Universal Postal Union in Switzerland,
- Best Customer Care Award 2018 by the Universal Postal Union in Switzerland,
- Public Sector Campaign of the Year 2018 by the Marketing World Awards,
- CIMG President Special Awards 2018 by Chartered Institute of Marketing Ghana (CIMG),
- Most Reliable and Fastest Courier Company in West Africa 2019 by Pillars Modern Ghana Awards,
- Excellence in Innovation and Technology 2019 by Ghana Shippers Awards,
- Outstanding Contribution to the Shipping Industry 2019 by Ghana Shippers Awards.
