= Regent University College of Science and Technology =

Private university in Ghana

Coordinates: 5°33′33″N 0°13′37″W

- Motto: Peace, Justice and Industry
- Type: Private
- Established: September 2003; 22 years ago
- Chancellor: Rev. Prof. Emmanuel Kingsley Larbi
- Location: Accra, Greater Accra Region, Ghana
- Website: www.regent.edu.gh

The Regent University College of Science and Technology (often referred to as Regent-Ghana) is located in Accra, Ghana. It was registered in September 2003, and received accreditation to operate as a tertiary institution in 2004. In January 2005 it started its lectures with 30 pioneer students at Trinity Campus, Mataheko.

Now, the University operates from its purpose built campus, located at McCarthy Hill, off the Mallam-Kasoa-Winneba Highway. It is recognized as one of the leading private science and technology Universities in Ghana.

In the 14th edition of the Webometrics Ranking of World Universities, Regent was ranked third best university in Ghana.

Regent University College of Science and Technology was ranked the best private University in Ghana in the July 2020 edition of the Webometrics Ranking of World Universities. Regent is ranked 7th University overall in Ghana in the same edition of the bi-annual ranking.

== Organization ==
The University College has four schools - the School of Business, Leadership and Legal Studies (SBLL), the Faculty of Arts and Sciences : the Faculty of Engineering, Computing and Allied Sciences (FECAS), and the School of Research and Graduate Studies (SRGS). The School of Research and Graduate Studies offers six postgraduate degree programmes - Master of Science in Statistics, Master of Science in Law and Corporate Administration, Master of Science and Master of Philosophy in Energy and Sustainability Management, Master of Divinity, Master of Theology. The School of Research and Graduate Studies provides oversight to all postgraduate programs. There is also the Language Centre and a newly established Centre for Academic Writing. A number of interdisciplinary programmes cross the boundaries between schools and disciplines.

== Faculties ==
=== School of Business, Leadership and Legal Studies ===
The School of Business, Leadership and Legal Studies (SBLL) teaches business courses with a strong computing content. The following are the departments under this school and the undergraduate degree programmes they each offer:

==== Department of Accounting and Finance ====
- BSc (Hons) Accounting and Information Systems
- BSc (Hons) Banking and Finance

==== Department of Management and Economics ====
- BSc (Hons) Management with Computing
- BBA eCommerce

=== Faculty of Arts and Sciences ===
==== Department of Psychology ====
- BSc Human Development and Psychology

==== Department of Theology, Ministry and Pentecostal Studies ====
- Bachelor of Theology with Management (Honours)

=== Faculty of Engineering, Computing and Allied Sciences (FECAS) ===
The School of Engineering, Computing and Allied Sciences (FECAS) provides ICT-based university education. The following are the departments under the school and the undergraduate degree programmes they offer:

==== Department of Informatics ====
- BSc (Hons) Computer Science
- BSc (Hons) Information Systems Sciences

==== Department of Engineering & Mathematical Sciences ====
- BEng (Hons) Applied Electronics & Systems Engineering
  - Telecommunications Engineering Option
  - Computer Engineering Option
  - Instrumentation Engineering Option

== Postgraduate studies ==
Accredited postgraduate degree programmes that the university offers are:

- Master of Business Administration (MBA)
- Master of Science in Statistics
- Master of Divinity
- Master of Theology
- MSc / MPhil Energy and Sustainability Management
- MSc Law and Corporate Administration

== Affiliations ==
The university is affiliated to five other universities.

- Kwame Nkrumah University of Science and Technology
- University of Education, Winneba, Ghana
- Universidad Católica de Murcia, Spain
- Acadia University, Nova Scotia, Canada
- Deggendorf University of Applied Sciences, Deggendorf, Germany
- Umwelt Campus Birkenfeld, Trier University of Applied Sciences, Germany
- Luleå University of Technology, Sweden
- Wheelock College, Boston, USA

== See also ==
- List of universities in Ghana
