= Paul Raci =

American actor

- Born: April 7, 1948 (age 78); Chicago, Illinois, U.S.
- Occupation: Actor
- Years active: 1987–present
- Known for: Sound of Metal and Sing Sing

Paul Raci (/ˈreɪsi/; born April 7, 1948) is an American character actor. A veteran of stage, film and television, he has appeared in a variety of projects, including small roles in Baskets and Parks and Recreation. In 2021, he was nominated for the Academy Award for Best Supporting Actor for his performance in Sound of Metal (2019).

== Life and career ==
Raci was born in Chicago, Illinois, the son of Laurel and Mitchell Raci. His family is of Polish descent, originally surnamed Racibożyński. He was raised as the hearing son of deaf parents, and is fluent in American Sign Language. Raci was a Hospital Corpsman in the United States Navy, attaining the rank of Petty Officer Second Class (HM2). He served aboard the aircraft carrier, the USS Coral Sea (CVA-43) from 1969 to 1973, serving two tours in Vietnam.

Raci received critical acclaim for his performance as Joe, the deaf mentor to the main character in Sound of Metal, released in 2020. For this role, he received the National Society of Film Critics Award for Best Supporting Actor and other accolades, including an Independent Spirit Award for Best Supporting Male, and nominations for both the BAFTA Award for Best Supporting Actor and the Academy Award for Best Supporting Actor. According to director Darius Marder, several high-profile actors were approached for the role, but for the sake of authenticity, Raci was selected because of his upbringing.

In 2021, he was selected by BJ Sam, the Nigerian international singer and producer, to represent the United States in the first universal Christmas music project with other global music icons including Bollywood playback singer Jaspinder Narula, Ghanaian singer Diana Hopeson, and Swiss actress Christina Zurbrügg.

== Filmography ==
=== Film ===
Year	Title	Role	Notes
1987	Rent-a-Cop	Waiter	
1990	Smoothtalker	Perry	
1993	Dragon: The Bruce Lee Story	Bad Guy	
1996	The Glimmer Man	Internal Affairs Agent #1	
2004	Fighting Tommy Riley	Bob Silver	
2012	She Wants Me	Paparazzi	
2013	No Ordinary Hero: The SuperDeafy Movie	Rudy Gold	
2020	Sound of Metal	Joe	
2022	Butcher's Crossing	McDonald	
2023	The Mother	Jons	
2023	The Secret Art of Human Flight	Mealworm	
2023	Sing Sing	Brent Buell	
2024	This Is Me... Now: A Love Story	Group Leader	
2026	Not Dead Yet	Cy	

=== Television ===
Year	Title	Role	Notes
1992	Baywatch	Dan	Episode: "Big Monday"
1992	L.A. Law	INS Agent Gruber	Episode: "P.S. Your Shrink Is Dead"
1995	Æon Flux	Tweeka / Onan	2 episodes; voice role
1995	The Marshal	Photographer	Episode: "These Foolish Things"
1997–1999	Todd McFarlane's Spawn	Additional Voices	6 episodes
1998	The Visitor	Dark Grey Suit	Episode: "The Trial"
2000	CSI: Crime Scene Investigation	Lie Detector Operator	Episode: "Blood Drops"
2002	ER	Mr. Spencer	Episode: "It's All in Your Head"
2003	The Handler	Nicky	Episode: "Under Color of Law"
2003	10-8: Officers on Duty	Manager	Episode: "The Wild Bunch"
2004	The Practice	Ralph 'Spinny' Spinaci	Episode: "New Hoods on the Block"
2006	Scrubs	Drunk Guy	Episode: "My Jiggly Ball"
2006	Las Vegas	Kenny Roman	Episode: "And Here's Mike with the Weather"
2006	Lucky Louie	Cal	Episode: "Drinking"
2006	Heroes	Ernie the Weasel	Episode: "Chapter Six 'Better Halves'"
2008	Life	Scruffy Man	Episode: "Jackpot"
2009	Free Radio	Homeless Man	Episode: "KDOG"
2010	Parks and Recreation	Eugene	Episode: "The Possum"
2010	Persons Unknown	Sherman Golightly	Episode: "And Then There Was One"
2011	Switched at Birth	Interpreter	2 episodes
2012	Rizzoli & Isles	Apartment Manager	Episode: "Welcome to the Dollhouse"
2018	Goliath	Dwight	Episode: "Diablo Verde"
2019	Baskets	Bart / Peter Gabriel's Drummer	Episode: "Homemakers"
2023	Perry Mason	Lydell McCutcheon	Recurring; 8 episodes

== Awards and nominations ==
Year	Award	Category	Nominated work	Result	Ref.
1985	Jeff Award	Actor in a Principal Role – Play	Children of a Lesser God	Nominated	
2020	Boston Society of Film Critics	Best Supporting Actor	Sound of Metal	Won	
2020	Chicago Film Critics Association	Best Supporting Actor	Sound of Metal	Won	
2020	Florida Film Critics Circle	Best Supporting Actor	Sound of Metal	Won	
2020	Los Angeles Film Critics Association	Best Supporting Actor	Sound of Metal	Runner-up	
2021	Academy Awards	Best Supporting Actor	Sound of Metal	Nominated	
2021	Austin Film Critics Association	Best Supporting Actor	Sound of Metal	Nominated	
2021	BAFTA Awards	Best Actor in a Supporting Role	Sound of Metal	Nominated	
2021	Critics' Choice Awards	Best Supporting Actor	Sound of Metal	Nominated	
2021	Dallas–Fort Worth Film Critics Association	Best Supporting Actor	Sound of Metal	Runner-up	
2021	Detroit Film Critics Society	Best Supporting Actor	Sound of Metal	Nominated	
2021	Dorian Awards	Best Supporting Actor	Sound of Metal	Nominated	
2021	Georgia Film Critics Association	Best Supporting Actor	Sound of Metal	Won	
2021	Hollywood Critics Association	Best Supporting Actor	Sound of Metal	Won	
2021	Houston Film Critics Society Awards	Best Supporting Actor	Sound of Metal	Nominated	
2021	Independent Spirit Awards	Best Supporting Male	Sound of Metal	Won	
2021	National Board of Review	Best Supporting Actor	Sound of Metal	Won	
2021	National Society of Film Critics Awards	Best Supporting Actor	Sound of Metal	Won	
2021	Online Film Critics Society Awards	Best Supporting Actor	Sound of Metal	Nominated	
2021	San Diego Film Critics Society Awards	Best Supporting Actor	Sound of Metal	Won	
2021	San Francisco Bay Area Film Critics Circle	Best Supporting Actor	Sound of Metal	Won	
2021	Seattle Film Critics Society	Best Supporting Actor	Sound of Metal	Nominated	
2021	St. Louis Film Critics Association	Best Supporting Actor	Sound of Metal	Won	
2021	Toronto Film Critics Association Awards	Best Supporting Actor	Sound of Metal	Runner-up	
2021	Washington DC Area Film Critics Association Awards	Best Supporting Actor	Sound of Metal	Nominated	
