= Mikkel E. G. Nielsen =

Danish film editor

- Born: Denmark
- Occupation: Film editor

Mikkel E. G. Nielsen is a Danish film editor. He won an Academy Award and was nominated for another one in the category Best Film Editing for the films Sound of Metal and The Banshees of Inisherin.

== Selected filmography ==
- A Royal Affair (2012)
- Madame Bovary (2014)
- The Outsider (2018)
- Sound of Metal (2020)
- The Banshees of Inisherin (2022)
- Wild Horse Nine (2026)
