= Nicolas Becker (sound engineer) =

French composer and sound engineer

- Occupations: Composer, sound engineer

Nicolas Becker is a French composer and sound engineer. He won an Academy Award in the category Best Sound for the film Sound of Metal.

== Selected filmography ==
- Sound of Metal (2020, co-won with Jaime Baksht, Michelle Couttolenc, Carlos Cortés Navarrete and Phillip Bladh)
- Dahomey (2024, sound with Corneille Houssou and Cyril Holtz)
