= Carlos Cortés Navarrete =

Mexican-American sound engineer

- Occupation: Sound engineer

Carlos Cortés Navarrete (born 1978) is a Mexican sound engineer. He won an Academy Award in the category Best Sound for the film Sound of Metal.

Cortés Navarrete is a native of Mexico City.

== Selected filmography ==
- Sound of Metal (2020; co-won with Nicolas Becker, Jaime Baksht, Michelle Couttolenc and Phillip Bladh)
