= Phillip Bladh =

American sound engineer

- Occupation: Sound engineer

Phillip Bladh is an American sound engineer. He won an Academy Award in the category Best Sound for the film Sound of Metal.

== Selected filmography ==
- Sound of Metal (2020; co-won with Nicolas Becker, Jaime Baksht, Michelle Couttolenc and Carlos Cortés Navarrete)
