= Jaime Baksht =

Mexican sound engineer

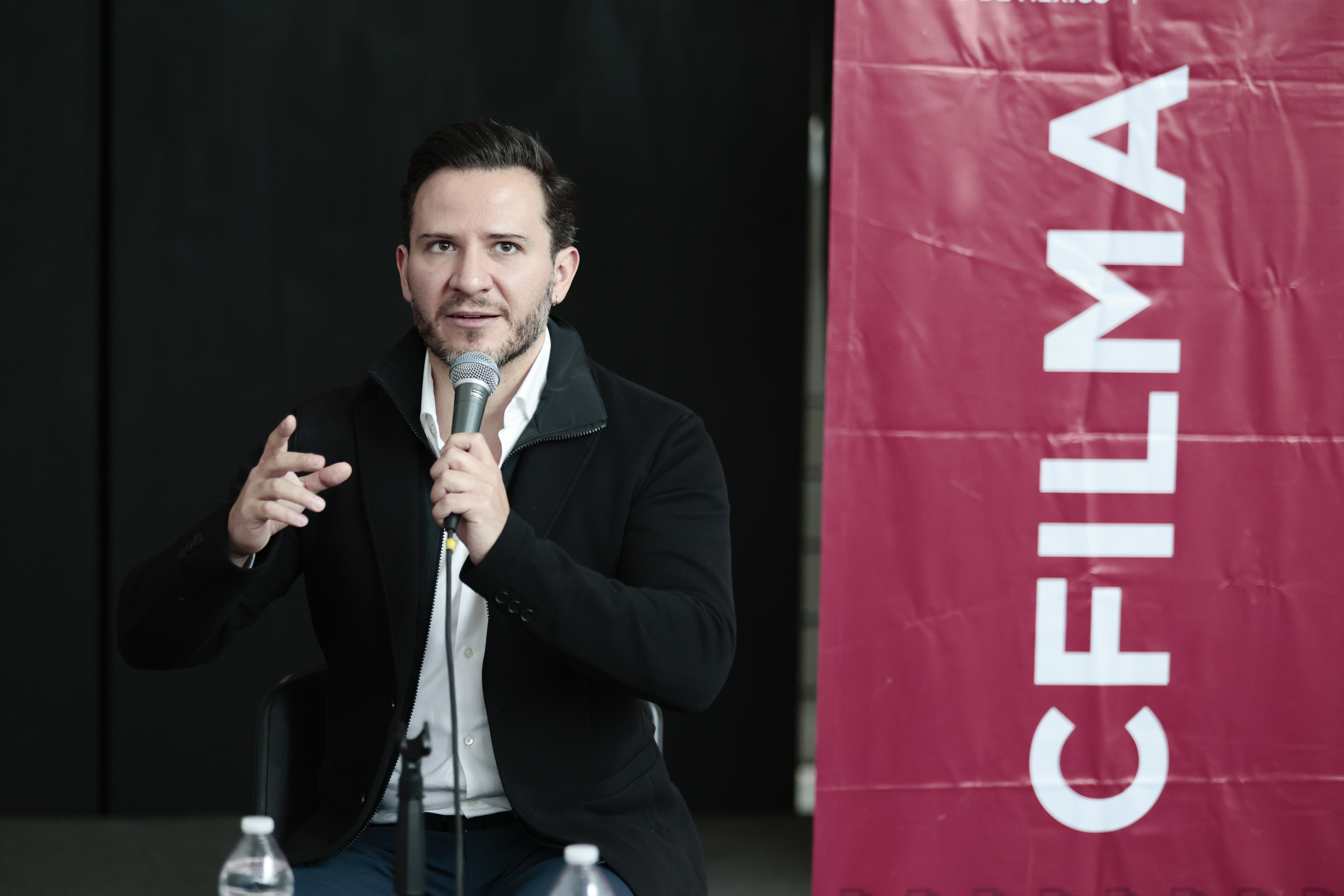
- Occupation: Sound engineer

Jaime Baksht is a Mexican sound engineer.

== Life and work ==
Baksht has worked as sound re-recording mixer in films such as La primera noche (1998), Herod's Law (1999), Sangre (2005), Batalla en el cielo (2005), En el hoyo (2006), Pan's Labyrinth (2006), Effectos secundarios (2006), Arráncame la vida (2008), Rudo y Cursi (2008), Abel (2010), La otra familia (2011), Post Tenebras Lux (film) (2012), Colosio: El asesinato (2012), La vida precoz y breve de Sabina Rivas (2012), Instructions Not Included (2013), Club Sándwich (2013), Besos de azúcar (2013), and The Golden Dream (2013), among others.

Baksht has been nominated in several occasions for the Ariel Award for Best Sound, winning in three occasions: in 2002 for Cuentos de hadas para dormir cocodrilos, in 2004 for Zurdo, and in 2007 for El hoyo. He won a Goya Award (also for Best Sound) for Pan's Labyrinth (2006).

Baksht is a multiple recipient of the Silver Ariel award for best sound (2007, 2004, 2002) and a recipient of the 2006 British Academy Award for best sound (Pan's Labyrinth).

Baksht received the Academy Award for Best Sound at the 93rd Academy Awards for his work on Sound of Metal alongside Nicolas Becker, Phillip Bladh, and the Mexicans Carlos Cortés Navarrete and Michelle Couttolenc.

== Awards ==
=== Academy Awards ===
Year	Category	Nominated work	Result	Ref.
2020	Best Sound	Sound of Metal	Won	
