= Michelle Couttolenc =

Mexican-American sound engineer

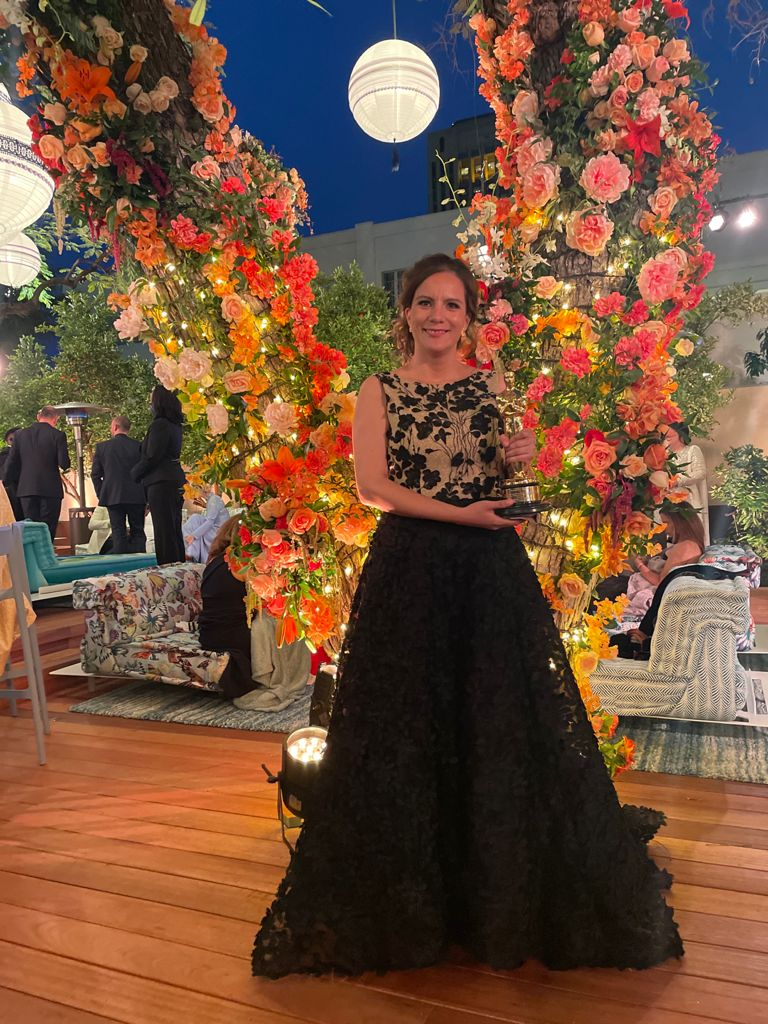
- Couttolenc in 2021
- Occupation: Sound engineer

Michelle Couttolenc is a Mexican sound engineer. She won an Academy Award in the category Best Sound and the BAFTA Award for Best Sound for the film Sound of Metal. Along with fellow nominees Jaime Baksht and Carlos Cortés Navarrete, she became the first Mexican sound engineer who won an Academy Award and the first Mexican woman sound engineer to ever be nominated. She is also the recipient of seven Ariel Awards for Best Sound.

== Selected filmography ==
- Dracula (2025; re-recording mixer)
- Olmo (2025; re-recording mixer)
- Depeche Mode: M (2025; re-recording mixer)
- Pedro Páramo (2024; re-recording mixer)
- La cocina (2024; re-recording mixer)
- Memory (2023; re-recording mixer)
- Do Not Expect Too Much from the End of the World (2023; re-recording mixer)
- El eco (2023; re-recording mixer)
- Cassandro (2023; re-recording mixer)
- Familia (2023; re-recording mixer)
- The Kings of the World (2022; re-recording mixer)
- Rebel (2022; re-recording mixer)
- A Cop Movie (2021; re-recording mixer)
- New Order (2020; re-recording mixer)
- Sound of Metal (2020; Academy Award and BAFTA Award for Best Sound co-won with Nicolas Becker, Jaime Baksht, Carlos Cortés Navarrete and Phillip Bladh)
- I'm No Longer Here (2019; re-recording mixer)
- Roma (2018; adr re-recordist)
- Tigers Are Not Afraid (2017; re-recording mixer assistant)
- Ana y Bruno (2017; re-recording mixer)
- ¿Qué culpa tiene el niño? (2016; re-recording mixer)
- The 4th Company (2016; re-recording mixer assistant)
- You're Killing Me Susana (2016; re-recording mixer assistant)
- The Thin Yellow Line (2015; re-recording mixer assistant)
- Gloria (2014; re-recording mixer assistant)
- Güeros (2014; re-recording mixer assistant)
- Instructions Not Included (2013; re-recording mixer assistant)
- The Golden Dream (2013; re-recording mixer assistant)
- Post Tenebras Lux (2012; re-recording mixer assistant)
- Perras (2011; re-recording mixer assistant)
- Abel (2010; re-recording mixer assistant)
- Paradas continuas (2009; re-recording mixer assistant)
- Rudo y cursi (2008; re-recording mixer assistant)
- Presumed Guilty (2008; re-recording mixer assistant)
- Silent Light (2007; re-recording mixer assistant)
- Déficit (2007; re-recording mixer assistant)
- Efectos secundarios (2006; re-recording mixer assistant)
- Pan's Labyrinth (2006; re-recording mixer assistant)

== Awards and nominations ==
Year	Award	Category	Nominated work	Result	Ref.
2014	Ariel Awards	Best Sound (Mejor sonido), shared with Jaime Baksht and Pablo Tamez Sierra	Tercera llamada	Nominated	
2014	Ariel Awards	Best Sound, shared with Jaime Baksht and Raúl Locatelli	The Golden Dream	Won	
2014	Fénix Awards	Best Sound, shared with Matías Barberis, Jaime Baksht and Raúl Locatelli	The Golden Dream	Won	
2015	Ariel Awards	Best Sound, shared with Isabel Muñoz Cota, Pedro González, Axel Muñoz, Kiyoshi Osawa, Gabriel Reyna and Jaime Baksht	Güeros	Won	
2016	Ariel Awards	Best Sound, shared with Matías Barberis and Jaime Baksht	Gloria	Won	
2017	Ariel Awards	Best Sound, shared with Isabel Muñoz Cota, Javier Umpierrez and Jaime Baksht	The 4th Company	Won	
2017	Ariel Awards	Best Sound, shared with Fernando Cámara, Stan Mak, Steven Avila, Trip Brock and Jaime Baksht	You're Killing Me Susana	Nominated	
2018	Ariel Awards	Best Sound, shared with Matías Barberis, Bernat Fortiana, Pablo Tamez Sierra and Jaime Baksht	La libertad del diablo	Nominated	
2018	Ariel Awards	Best Sound, shared with Emilio Cortés, Martín Hernández, Alejandro Quevedo and Jaime Baksht	Tigers Are Not Afraid	Nominated	
2018	Fénix Awards	Best Sound, shared with Javier Umpierrez, Isabel Muñoz Cota and Jaime Baksht	Museo	Nominated	
2019	Ariel Awards	Best Sound, shared with Javier Umpierrez, Isabel Muñoz Cota and Jaime Baksht	Museo	Nominated	
2019	Ariel Awards	Best Sound, shared with Raúl Locatelli, Carlos Cortés Navarrete, Jaime Baksht and Javier Umpierrez	Our Time	Nominated	
2020	Ariel Awards	Best Sound, shared with Isabel Muñoz Cota, Christian Giraud, Alejandro de Icaza and Jaime Baksht	Belzebuth	Nominated	
2020	Ariel Awards	Best Sound (Mejor dirección de sonido), shared with Javier Umpierrez, Olaitan Agueh, Yuri Laguna and Jaime Baksht	I'm No Longer Here	Won	
2021	Platino Awards	Best Sound (Mejor dirección de sonido), shared with Javier Umpierrez, Olaitan Agueh, Yuri Laguna and Jaime Baksht	I'm No Longer Here	Nominated	
2021	Ariel Awards	Best Sound, shared with Raúl Locatelli, Alejandro de Icaza and Jaime Baksht	New Order	Nominated	
2021	Ariel Awards	Best Sound, shared with José Miguel Enríquez, Federico González Jordán and Jaime Baksht	Tragic Jungle	Won	
2021	Academy Awards	Best Sound, shared with Nicolas Becker, Jaime Baksht, Carlos Cortés Navarrete and Phillip Bladh	Sound of Metal	Won	
2021	BAFTA Awards	Best Sound, shared with Nicolas Becker, Jaime Baksht, Carlos Cortés Navarrete and Phillip Bladh	Sound of Metal	Won	
2021	Gold Derby Awards	Best Sound, shared with Nicolas Becker, Jaime Baksht, Carlos Cortés Navarrete and Phillip Bladh	Sound of Metal	Won	
2021	Cinema Audio Society	Outstanding Achievement in Sound Mixing for Motion Pictures - Live Action, shared with Nicolas Becker, Jaime Baksht, Carlos Cortés Navarrete, Phillip Bladh and Kari Vähäkuopus	Sound of Metal	Won	
2021	Satellite Awards	Best Sound (Editing & Mixing), shared with Phillip Bladh, Nicolas Becker, Carlos Cortés Navarrete, Jaime Baksht and Maria Carolina Santana Caraballo-Gramcko	Sound of Metal	Won	
2021	Latino Entertainment Journalist Association Film Awards	Best Sound, shared with Phillip Bladh, Nicolas Becker, Carlos Cortés Navarrete, Jaime Baksht and Maria Carolina Santana Caraballo-Gramcko	Sound of Metal	Won	
2021	International Cinephile Society Awards	Best Sound Design, shared with Nicolas Becker and Phillip Bladh	Sound of Metal	Won	
2021	International Online Cinema Awards	Best Sound Mixing, shared with Phillip Bladh, Carlos Cortés Navarrete and Jaime Baksht	Sound of Metal	Won	
2021	Association of Motion Picture Sound	Excellence in Sound for a Feature Film, shared with Phillip Bladh, Jeremy Eisener, Nicolas Becker and Jaime Baksht	Sound of Metal	Won	
2021	Minnesota Film Critics Alliance Awards	Best Sound Work, shared with Nicolas Becker, Jaime Baksht, Carlos Cortés Navarrete and Phillip Bladh	Sound of Metal	Won	
2021	Hollywood Professional Association Awards	Outstanding Sound - Teathrical Feature, shared with Nicolas Becker, Carolina Santana Caraballo-Gramcko, Carlos Cortés Navarrete and Jaime Baksht	Sound of Metal	Nominated	
2021	Golden Reel Awards	Outstanding Achievement in Sound Editing - Dialogue and ADR for Feature Film, shared with Nicolas Becker and Carolina Santana Caraballo-Gramcko	Sound of Metal	Nominated	
2022	Ariel Awards	Best Sound, shared with Guido Berenblum, Santiago Arroyo and Jaime Baksht	El hoyo en la cerca	Nominated	
2022	Ariel Awards	Best Sound, shared with Isabel Muñoz Cota, Javier Umpierrez and Jaime Baksht	A Cop Movie	Nominated	
2023	Macondo Awards	Best Sound (Mejor sonido), shared with Carlos García and Boris Herrera Allende	The Kings of the World	Won	
2023	Ensor Awards	Best Sound (Beste Geluid), shared with Jaime Baksht, Guilhem Donzel, Jeroen Truijens and Loïc Collignon	Rebel	Nominated	
2024	Mucuripe Trophy Cine Ceará Ibero- American Film Festival	Best Sound (Melhor som) shared with Jaime Baksht, Valeria López Mancheva and Lena Esquenazi	En La Caliente: Tales of a Reggaeton Warrior	Won	
2024	Ariel Awards	Best Sound, shared with Martin de Torcy, Lena Esquenazi and Jaime Baksht	El eco	Nominated	
2024	Gopo Awards	Best Sound (Cel mai bun sunet), shared with Hrvoje Radnic, Marius Leftãrache, Mariana Balan and Jaime Baksht	Do Not Expect Too Much From The End of the World	Nominated	
2025	Ariel Awards	Best Sound, shared with Isabel Muñoz Cota, Javier Umpierrez and Jaime Baksht	La cocina	Won	
2025	Ariel Awards	Best Sound, shared with Santiago Núñez, Skip Lievsay, Rich Bologna, Severin Favriau and Jaime Baksht	Pedro Páramo	Nominated	
