= Sergio Díaz (sound editor) =

Supervising sound editor, sound designer and re-recording mixer

- Born: 15 July 1969 (age 56); Mexico City, Mexico
- Occupations: Supervising Sound Editor, Sound Designer and Re-Recording Mixer

Sergio Díaz (born 15 July 1969) is a supervising sound editor, sound designer and re-recording mixer for film and television.

== Career ==
Díaz was nominated for an Academy Award in 2019 for his work on Roma, for which he also won the Ariel Award for Best Sound. He was the recipient of Golden Reel Awards for both Roma and Pan's Labyrinth. He has also been nominated for additional Ariel Awards for Best Sound (The Untamed, The Thin Yellow Line, Heli, Silent Light), Golden Reel Awards (Roma, Hellboy II, Pan's Labyrinth, Babel), Fénix Awards for Best Sound (The Untamed, Desierto, and Heli) and Platino Awards for Best Sound (Roma, Desierto). His other credits include 21 Grams, Into the Wild, Battle in Heaven, Post Tenebras Lux, Año Uña (directed by Jonás Cuarón), Sangre.
