= Ghana Music Rights Organization =

Music licensing organization

Ghana Music Rights Organization (GHAMRO) is a royalties collection agency within Ghana that represents the broadcast, public performance, mechanical and in some cases, the synchronization rights of music copyright holders. GHAMRO is currently been run by a 7- member board of directors. These board of directors consists of 3 composers, 2 performers, 1 publisher and 1 producer. GHAMRO is not run by government, it is run by a non-profit corperate body functioning as a collective management organization. GHAMRO was created under Section 49 of the Copyright Law, Act 690 of 2005. The agency collects royalties for music rights ownx̌ers in Ghana. Before 2005, that function had been operated by the Copyright Society of Ghana. The organization has faced regular criticism about payment of royalties to stakeholders resulting from the failure of music users in Ghana to pay for the use of music. Due to this GHAMRO sued GBC over failure to pay royalties. As of 2018, the organization was led by Rex Omar. As of February 2024, Jackson Brefo, was the CEO for GHAMRO. The CEO of Ghana Music Rights Organization (GHAMRO). When Jackson Brafo came to power, he revealed the organization's struggles with funding and revenue collection. This revelation came about on May 23, 2025 during a discussion on the GhanaWeb X Space.
