= Christina Zurbrügg =

Christina Zurbrügg (born 27 March 1961 in Reichenbach im Kandertal, Switzerland), is a Swiss singer, modern yodeler Film director residing in Vienna.

== Life and work ==
Christina Zurbrügg grew up in the Bernese Oberland. She studied acting and classical singing in Vienna. She became known for her musical theater productions about Federico García Lorca. Zurbrügg deals with folk music. She filmed the documentary "Orvuse on Oanwe" about Vienna's last yodelers and discovered her own roots in the process. Later, the solo program followed "Christls Wonder World". Her album "Now" was reviewed as "first class, pop musical work between tradition and modernity." Zurbrügg combines singing, rap and contemporary, modern yodeling with songwriting. In 2001 she founded with Michael Hudecek, with whom she made many projects together, the Gams Film & Music.

== Discography ==
- 1990: Café de Chinitas. Spanish Folk Songs of F.G. Lorca; A tubs full of children, to snotty man. Folk Songs from the woman's life
- 1991: Scared. songs
- 1992: Sunset with Café de Chinitas
- 1995: Ciudad sin sueño – No one sleeps in the sky. Settings of F.G. Lorca
- 1999: Äs chönnti alls completely different sii. New yodelling and songs
- 2002: Tai Chill by zurbrügg & hudecek. soundtrack; Christl's Wonder World
- 2005: Lorca & More. Best of Spanish 1990 – 2005
- 2007: Now. Twelve Songs & a yodel
- 2009: Best of yodel. 99-09
- 2010: change of register

== Filmography ==
- 1998: Orvuse on Oanwe – The last doodlers Vienna. Director: Zurbrügg
- 2000: The 99 best inventions of mankind. Director: Zurbrügg and Hudecek
- 2001: In Out – Move the World. With Birgit Heyn. Director: Zurbrügg
- 2006: Stay or Go. Director: Zurbrügg & Hudecek
- 2008: Half-time. Director: Zurbrügg & Hudecek

== Awards ==
- 2009: Nominated for the "Rose d'Or" for the movie "half" of Zurbrügg & Hudecek
- 2007: "Golden Dragon" for the movie "Stay or Go" by Zurbrügg and Hudecek
- 2002: BKA premium for "Christl's Wonderful World"
- 1990: BMUK or 1995: Cultural Office Vienna: the awards for "Café de Chinitas"

== Writings ==
- Orvuse on Oanwe – doodlers in Vienna, Vienna 1996
- Negress, The apple, Vienna 1994. ISBN 978-3-85450-092-6
