= List of accolades received by Nomadland =

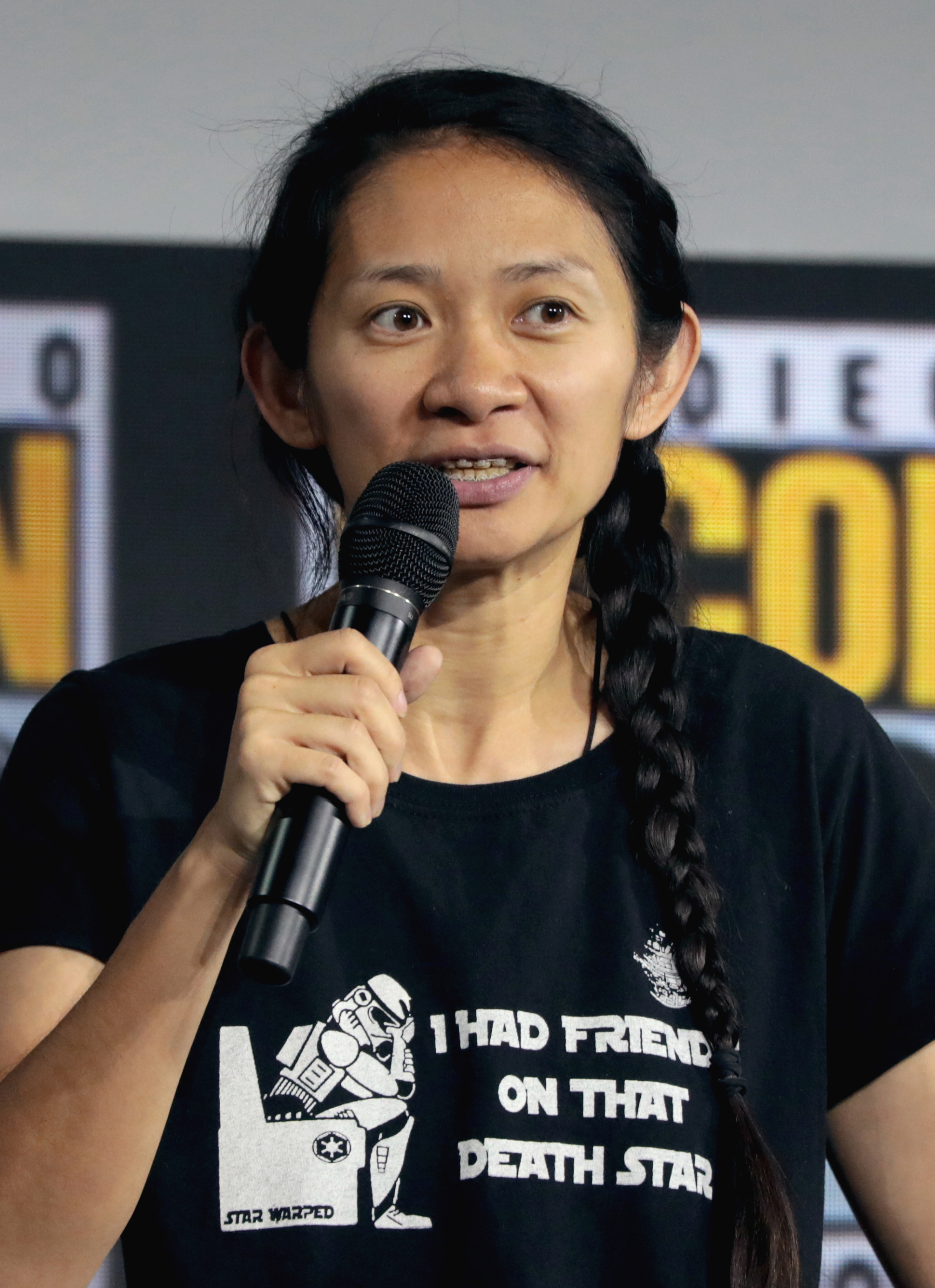
- Chloé Zhao (left) received critical acclaim for her direction and screenplay, and Frances McDormand (right) for her performance.
Awards and nominations
Award	Wins	Nominations
AACTA International Awards	1	6
Academy Awards	3	6
Alliance of Women Film Journalists	6	9
ACE Eddie Awards	0	1
American Film Institute Awards	1	1
American Society of Cinematographers	0	1
Austin Film Critics Association	3	7
Belgian Film Critics Association	0	1
Boston Society of Film Critics	4	4
British Academy Film Awards	4	7
British Independent Film Awards	1	1
Chicago Film Critics Association	5	7
Coronado Island Film Festival	1	1
Critics' Choice Movie Awards	4	6
Dallas–Fort Worth Film Critics Association	4	4
Detroit Film Critics Society	4	4
Directors Guild of America Awards	1	1
Dorian Awards	3	5
Florida Film Critics Circle	4	6
Golden Globe Awards	2	4
Gotham Awards	2	3
Hollywood Critics Association Awards	2	6
Houston Film Critics Society	2	5
Independent Spirit Awards	4	5
London Film Critics' Circle	3	5
Los Angeles Film Critics Association	2	2
Motion Picture Sound Editors Golden Reel Awards	0	1
National Board of Review	1	1
National Society of Film Critics	4	4
New York Film Critics Circle	1	1
New York Film Critics Online	3	3
Online Film Critics Society	6	6
Producers Guild of America Awards	1	1
San Diego International Film Festival	1	1
San Francisco Bay Area Film Critics Circle Awards	4	7
Satellite Awards	3	8
Screen Actors Guild Awards	0	1
Seattle Film Critics Society	5	6
Toronto Film Critics Association	3	4
Toronto International Film Festival	1	1
USC Scripter Awards	1	1
Vancouver Film Critics Circle	3	3
Venice Film Festival	3	3
Washington D.C. Area Film Critics Association	5	6

Totals (Note: Certain award groups do not simply award one winner. They acknowledge several different recipients, have runners-up, and have third place. Since this is a specific recognition and is different from losing an award, runner-up mentions are considered wins in this award tally. For simplification and to avoid errors, each award in this list has been presumed to have had a prior nomination.)
- Wins: 109
- Nominations: 160

Nomadland is a 2020 American drama film directed, written, and edited by Chloé Zhao. Based on the 2017 non-fiction book Nomadland: Surviving America in the Twenty-First Century by Jessica Bruder, it stars Frances McDormand as a woman who leaves home to travel around the American West. The film's supporting cast includes David Strathairn, as well as real-life nomads Linda May, Swankie, and Bob Wells, as fictionalized versions of themselves. Nomadland had a one-week streaming limited release on December 4, 2020, and was released by Searchlight Pictures in selected IMAX theaters in the United States on January 29, 2021, and simultaneously in theaters and streaming digitally on Hulu on February 19, 2021.

Nomadland garnered acclaim, becoming the third-highest rated of 2020 on Metacritic, which found it to be the most frequently ranked by critics and publications as one of the best films of 2020. It premiered on September 11, 2020, at the Venice Film Festival, where it won the Golden Lion, and also won the People's Choice Award at the Toronto International Film Festival. It was named one of the ten best films of 2020 by the National Board of Review and the American Film Institute, and received four nominations at the 78th Golden Globe Awards, winning Best Motion Picture – Drama and Best Director; in winning the latter award, Zhao became the second woman and the first Asian woman to do so.

== Accolades ==
Award	Date of ceremony	Category	Recipient(s)	Result	Ref.
Venice Film Festival	September 12, 2020	Golden Lion	Chloé Zhao	Won	
Venice Film Festival	September 12, 2020	Fair Play Cinema Award	Chloé Zhao	Won	
Venice Film Festival	September 12, 2020	SIGNIS Award - Honorable Mention	Chloé Zhao	Won	
Toronto International Film Festival	September 20, 2020	People's Choice Award	Chloé Zhao	Won	
Coronado Island Film Festival	November 14, 2020	Leonard Maltin Tribute Award	Chloé Zhao	Won	
San Diego International Film Festival	October 21, 2020	Audience Choice Gala		Won	
Boston Society of Film Critics Awards	December 13, 2020	Best Film		Won	
Boston Society of Film Critics Awards	December 13, 2020	Best Director	Chloé Zhao	Won	
Boston Society of Film Critics Awards	December 13, 2020	Best Cinematography	Joshua James Richards	Won	
Boston Society of Film Critics Awards	December 13, 2020	Best Editing	Chloé Zhao	Runner-up	
Los Angeles Film Critics Association	December 20, 2020	Best Director	Chloé Zhao	Won	
Los Angeles Film Critics Association	December 20, 2020	Best Cinematography	Joshua James Richards	Runner-up	
Chicago Film Critics Association	December 21, 2020	Best Picture		Won	
Chicago Film Critics Association	December 21, 2020	Best Director	Chloé Zhao	Won	
Chicago Film Critics Association	December 21, 2020	Best Actress	Frances McDormand	Won	
Chicago Film Critics Association	December 21, 2020	Best Supporting Actor	David Strathairn	Nominated	
Chicago Film Critics Association	December 21, 2020	Best Adapted Screenplay	Chloé Zhao	Won	
Chicago Film Critics Association	December 21, 2020	Best Cinematography	Joshua James Richards	Won	
Chicago Film Critics Association	December 21, 2020	Best Editing	Chloé Zhao	Nominated	
Florida Film Critics Circle Awards	December 21, 2020	Best Film		Runner-up	
Florida Film Critics Circle Awards	December 21, 2020	Best Director	Chloé Zhao	Won	
Florida Film Critics Circle Awards	December 21, 2020	Best Actress	Frances McDormand	Won	
Florida Film Critics Circle Awards	December 21, 2020	Best Supporting Actress	Charlene Swankie	Nominated	
Florida Film Critics Circle Awards	December 21, 2020	Best Adapted Screenplay	Chloé Zhao	Runner-up	
Florida Film Critics Circle Awards	December 21, 2020	Best Cinematography	Joshua James Richards	Nominated	
New York Film Critics Circle Awards	December 18, 2020	Best Director	Chloé Zhao	Won	
Alliance of Women Film Journalists	January 4, 2021	Best Picture		Won	
Alliance of Women Film Journalists	January 4, 2021	Best Director	Chloé Zhao	Won	
Alliance of Women Film Journalists	January 4, 2021	Best Writing, Adapted Screenplay	Chloé Zhao	Won	
Alliance of Women Film Journalists	January 4, 2021	Best Film Editing	Chloé Zhao	Won	
Alliance of Women Film Journalists	January 4, 2021	Best Woman Director	Chloé Zhao	Nominated	
Alliance of Women Film Journalists	January 4, 2021	Best Woman Screenwriter	Chloé Zhao	Nominated	
Alliance of Women Film Journalists	January 4, 2021	Best Actress	Frances McDormand	Won	
Alliance of Women Film Journalists	January 4, 2021	Actress Defying Age and Ageism	Frances McDormand	Nominated	
Alliance of Women Film Journalists	January 4, 2021	Best Cinematography	Joshua James Richards	Won	
National Society of Film Critics Awards	January 9, 2021	Best Picture		Won	
National Society of Film Critics Awards	January 9, 2021	Best Director	Chloé Zhao	Won	
National Society of Film Critics Awards	January 9, 2021	Best Actress	Frances McDormand	Won	
National Society of Film Critics Awards	January 9, 2021	Best Cinematography	Joshua James Richards	Won	
Gotham Independent Film Awards	January 11, 2021	Best Feature	Frances McDormand, Peter Spears, Mollye Asher, Dan Janvey, Chloé Zhao	Won	
Gotham Independent Film Awards	January 11, 2021	Best Actress	Frances McDormand	Nominated	
Gotham Independent Film Awards	January 11, 2021	Audience Award		Won	
Houston Film Critics Society Awards	January 18, 2021	Best Picture		Won	
Houston Film Critics Society Awards	January 18, 2021	Best Director	Chloé Zhao	Won	
Houston Film Critics Society Awards	January 18, 2021	Best Screenplay	Chloé Zhao	Nominated	
Houston Film Critics Society Awards	January 18, 2021	Best Actress	Frances McDormand	Nominated	
Houston Film Critics Society Awards	January 18, 2021	Best Cinematography	Joshua James Richards	Nominated	
San Francisco Bay Area Film Critics Circle Awards	January 18, 2021	Best Film		Won	
San Francisco Bay Area Film Critics Circle Awards	January 18, 2021	Best Director	Chloé Zhao	Won	
San Francisco Bay Area Film Critics Circle Awards	January 18, 2021	Best Adapted Screenplay	Chloé Zhao	Nominated	
San Francisco Bay Area Film Critics Circle Awards	January 18, 2021	Best Film Editing	Chloé Zhao	Won	
San Francisco Bay Area Film Critics Circle Awards	January 18, 2021	Best Actress	Frances McDormand	Won	
San Francisco Bay Area Film Critics Circle Awards	January 18, 2021	Best Supporting Actor	David Strathairn	Nominated	
San Francisco Bay Area Film Critics Circle Awards	January 18, 2021	Best Cinematography	Joshua James Richards	Nominated	
Online Film Critics Society Awards	January 25, 2021	Best Picture		Won	
Online Film Critics Society Awards	January 25, 2021	Best Director	Chloé Zhao	Won	
Online Film Critics Society Awards	January 25, 2021	Best Adapted Screenplay	Chloé Zhao	Won	
Online Film Critics Society Awards	January 25, 2021	Best Editing	Chloé Zhao	Won	
Online Film Critics Society Awards	January 25, 2021	Best Actress	Frances McDormand	Won	
Online Film Critics Society Awards	January 25, 2021	Best Cinematography	Joshua James Richards	Won	
National Board of Review	January 26, 2021	Top 10 Films		Won	
New York Film Critics Online	January 27, 2021	Top 10 Films of 2020		Won	
New York Film Critics Online	January 27, 2021	Best Director	Chloé Zhao	Won	
New York Film Critics Online	January 27, 2021	Best Cinematography	Joshua James Richards	Won	
Toronto Film Critics Association	February 7, 2021	Best Film	Mollye Asher, Dan Janvey, Frances McDormand, Peter Spears, Chloé Zhao	Won	
Toronto Film Critics Association	February 7, 2021	Best Director	Chloé Zhao	Won	
Toronto Film Critics Association	February 7, 2021	Best Actress	Frances McDormand	Won	
Toronto Film Critics Association	February 7, 2021	Best Screenplay	Chloé Zhao	Nominated	
London Film Critics' Circle	February 7, 2021	Film of the Year	Mollye Asher, Dan Janvey, Frances McDormand, Peter Spears, Chloé Zhao	Won	
London Film Critics' Circle	February 7, 2021	Director of the Year	Chloé Zhao	Nominated	
London Film Critics' Circle	February 7, 2021	Actress of the Year	Frances McDormand	Won	
London Film Critics' Circle	February 7, 2021	Screenwriter of the Year	Chloé Zhao	Won	
London Film Critics' Circle	February 7, 2021	Technical Achievement Award	Joshua James Richards	Nominated	
Washington D.C. Area Film Critics Association Awards	February 8, 2021	Best Film		Won	
Washington D.C. Area Film Critics Association Awards	February 8, 2021	Best Director	Chloé Zhao	Won	
Washington D.C. Area Film Critics Association Awards	February 8, 2021	Best Adapted Screenplay	Chloé Zhao	Won	
Washington D.C. Area Film Critics Association Awards	February 8, 2021	Best Editing	Chloé Zhao	Nominated	
Washington D.C. Area Film Critics Association Awards	February 8, 2021	Best Actress	Frances McDormand	Won	
Washington D.C. Area Film Critics Association Awards	February 8, 2021	Best Cinematography	Joshua James Richards	Won	
Dallas–Fort Worth Film Critics Association	February 10, 2021	Best Film		Won	
Dallas–Fort Worth Film Critics Association	February 10, 2021	Best Director	Chloé Zhao	Won	
Dallas–Fort Worth Film Critics Association	February 10, 2021	Best Actress	Frances McDormand	2nd place	
Dallas–Fort Worth Film Critics Association	February 10, 2021	Best Cinematography	Joshua James Richards	Won	
Satellite Awards	February 15, 2021	Best Motion Picture – Drama		Won	
Satellite Awards	February 15, 2021	Best Director	Chloé Zhao	Won	
Satellite Awards	February 15, 2021	Best Adapted Screenplay	Chloé Zhao	Nominated	
Satellite Awards	February 15, 2021	Best Film Editing	Chloé Zhao	Nominated	
Satellite Awards	February 15, 2021	Best Actress in a Motion Picture – Drama	Frances McDormand	Won	
Satellite Awards	February 15, 2021	Best Supporting Actor – Motion Picture	David Strathairn	Nominated	
Satellite Awards	February 15, 2021	Best Cinematography	Joshua James Richards	Nominated	
Satellite Awards	February 15, 2021	Best Sound (Editing and Mixing)	Sergio Díaz, Zach Seivers and M. Wolf Snyder	Nominated	
Seattle Film Critics Society	February 15, 2021	Best Picture		Won	
Seattle Film Critics Society	February 15, 2021	Best Director	Chloé Zhao	Won	
Seattle Film Critics Society	February 15, 2021	Best Screenplay	Chloé Zhao	Nominated	
Seattle Film Critics Society	February 15, 2021	Best Film Editing	Chloé Zhao	Won	
Seattle Film Critics Society	February 15, 2021	Best Actress	Frances McDormand	Won	
Seattle Film Critics Society	February 15, 2021	Best Cinematography	Joshua James Richards	Won	
British Independent Film Awards	February 18, 2021	Best International Independent Film		Won	
Vancouver Film Critics Circle Awards	February 22, 2021	Best Film		Won	
Vancouver Film Critics Circle Awards	February 22, 2021	Best Director	Chloé Zhao	Won	
Vancouver Film Critics Circle Awards	February 22, 2021	Best Actress	Frances McDormand	Won	
American Film Institute Awards	February 26, 2021	Top 10 Movies of the Year		Won	
Golden Globe Awards	February 28, 2021	Best Motion Picture – Drama		Won	
Golden Globe Awards	February 28, 2021	Best Actress in a Motion Picture – Drama	Frances McDormand	Nominated	
Golden Globe Awards	February 28, 2021	Best Director	Chloé Zhao	Won	
Golden Globe Awards	February 28, 2021	Best Screenplay	Chloé Zhao	Nominated	
Hollywood Critics Association Awards	March 5, 2021	Best Picture		Nominated	
Hollywood Critics Association Awards	March 5, 2021	Best Female Director	Chloé Zhao	Won	
Hollywood Critics Association Awards	March 5, 2021	Best Adapted Screenplay	Chloé Zhao	Nominated	
Hollywood Critics Association Awards	March 5, 2021	Best Film Editing	Chloé Zhao	Nominated	
Hollywood Critics Association Awards	March 5, 2021	Best Actress	Frances McDormand	Nominated	
Hollywood Critics Association Awards	March 5, 2021	Best Cinematography	Joshua James Richards	Won	
AACTA Awards	March 5, 2021	Best International Film		Nominated	
AACTA Awards	March 5, 2021	Best International Direction	Chloé Zhao	Won	
AACTA Awards	March 5, 2021	Best International Screenplay	Chloé Zhao	Nominated	
AACTA Awards	March 5, 2021	Best International Actress	Frances McDormand	Nominated	
AACTA Awards	March 5, 2021	Best International Supporting Actor	David Strathairn	Nominated	
AACTA Awards	March 5, 2021	Best International Supporting Actress	Swankie	Nominated	
Critics' Choice Awards	March 7, 2021	Best Picture		Won	
Critics' Choice Awards	March 7, 2021	Best Director	Chloé Zhao	Won	
Critics' Choice Awards	March 7, 2021	Best Adapted Screenplay	Chloé Zhao	Won	
Critics' Choice Awards	March 7, 2021	Best Editing	Chloé Zhao	Nominated	
Critics' Choice Awards	March 7, 2021	Best Actress	Frances McDormand	Nominated	
Critics' Choice Awards	March 7, 2021	Best Cinematography	Joshua James Richards	Won	
Detroit Film Critics Society	March 8, 2021	Best Picture		Won	
Detroit Film Critics Society	March 8, 2021	Best Director	Chloé Zhao	Won	
Detroit Film Critics Society	March 8, 2021	Best Actress	Frances McDormand	Won	
Detroit Film Critics Society	March 8, 2021	Best Adapted Screenplay	Chloé Zhao	Won	
USC Scripter Awards	March 13, 2021	Film	Chloé Zhao	Won	
Austin Film Critics Association	March 19, 2021	Best Film		Nominated	
Austin Film Critics Association	March 19, 2021	Best Director	Chloé Zhao	Nominated	
Austin Film Critics Association	March 19, 2021	Best Editing	Chloé Zhao	Won	
Austin Film Critics Association	March 19, 2021	Best Adapted Screenplay	Chloé Zhao	Won	
Austin Film Critics Association	March 19, 2021	Best Actress	Frances McDormand	Nominated	
Austin Film Critics Association	March 19, 2021	Best Supporting Actor	David Strathairn	Nominated	
Austin Film Critics Association	March 19, 2021	Best Cinematography	Joshua James Richards	Won	
Producers Guild of America Awards	March 24, 2021	Outstanding Producer of Theatrical Motion Pictures	Frances McDormand, Peter Spears, Mollye Asher, Dan Janvey, and Chloé Zhao	Won	
Screen Actors Guild Awards	April 4, 2021	Outstanding Performance by a Female Actor in a Leading Role	Frances McDormand	Nominated	
Directors Guild of America Awards	April 10, 2021	Outstanding Directorial Achievement in Motion Pictures	Chloé Zhao	Won	
British Academy Film Awards	April 11, 2021	Best Film	Mollye Asher, Dan Janvey, Frances McDormand, Peter Spears and Chloé Zhao	Won	
British Academy Film Awards	April 11, 2021	Best Director	Chloé Zhao	Won	
British Academy Film Awards	April 11, 2021	Best Adapted Screenplay	Chloé Zhao	Nominated	
British Academy Film Awards	April 11, 2021	Best Editing	Chloé Zhao	Nominated	
British Academy Film Awards	April 11, 2021	Best Actress in a Leading Role	Frances McDormand	Won	
British Academy Film Awards	April 11, 2021	Best Cinematography	Joshua James Richards	Won	
British Academy Film Awards	April 11, 2021	Best Sound	Sergio Diaz, Zach Seivers, M. Wolf Snyder	Nominated	
Motion Picture Sound Editors Golden Reel Awards	April 16, 2021	Outstanding Achievement in Sound Editing – Dialogue and ADR for Feature Film	Sergio Díaz and Zach Seivers	Nominated	
ACE Eddie Awards	April 17, 2021	Best Edited Feature Film – Dramatic	Chloé Zhao	Nominated	
American Society of Cinematographers	April 18, 2021	Outstanding Achievement in Cinematography in Theatrical Releases	Joshua James Richards	Nominated	
Dorian Awards	April 18, 2021	Best Film		Won	
Dorian Awards	April 18, 2021	Best Director	Chloé Zhao	Won	
Dorian Awards	April 18, 2021	Best Screenplay (Original or Adapted)	Chloé Zhao	Nominated	
Dorian Awards	April 18, 2021	Best Film Performance – Actress	Frances McDormand	Nominated	
Dorian Awards	April 18, 2021	Most Visually Striking Film		Won	
Independent Spirit Awards	April 22, 2021	Best Feature	Mollye Asher, Dan Janvey, Frances McDormand, Peter Spears and Chloé Zhao	Won	
Independent Spirit Awards	April 22, 2021	Best Director	Chloé Zhao	Won	
Independent Spirit Awards	April 22, 2021	Best Female Lead	Frances McDormand	Nominated	
Independent Spirit Awards	April 22, 2021	Best Cinematography	Joshua James Richards	Won	
Independent Spirit Awards	April 22, 2021	Best Editing	Chloé Zhao	Won	
Academy Awards	April 25, 2021	Best Picture	Frances McDormand, Peter Spears, Mollye Asher, Dan Janvey, and Chloé Zhao	Won	
Academy Awards	April 25, 2021	Best Director	Chloé Zhao	Won	
Academy Awards	April 25, 2021	Best Actress	Frances McDormand	Won	
Academy Awards	April 25, 2021	Best Adapted Screenplay	Chloé Zhao	Nominated	
Academy Awards	April 25, 2021	Best Cinematography	Joshua James Richards	Nominated	
Academy Awards	April 25, 2021	Best Film Editing	Chloé Zhao	Nominated	
Belgian Film Critics Association	January 8, 2022	Grand Prix		Nominated	
Grande Prêmio do Cinema Brasileiro	August 10, 2022	Best International Film		Won	

== See also ==
- 2020 in film
- List of awards and nominations received by Chloé Zhao
- List of awards and nominations received by Frances McDormand
