= List of awards and nominations received by Chloé Zhao =

Chloé Zhao awards and nominations
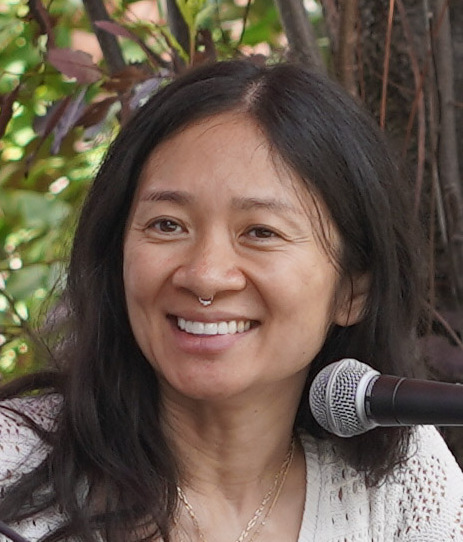
- Zhao at the 2025 Telluride Film Festival
Awards and nominations
Award	Wins	Nominations
Academy Awards	2	6
BAFTA Awards	3	7
Critics' Choice Awards	3	6
Directors Guild of America Awards	1	2
Golden Globe Awards	1	4
Producers Guild of America Awards	1	1
Writers Guild of America Awards	0	1

Totals (Note: Certain award groups do not simply award one winner. They acknowledge several different recipients, have runners-up, and have third place. Since this is a specific recognition and is different from losing an award, runner-up mentions are considered wins in this award tally. For simplification and to avoid errors, each award in this list has been presumed to have had a prior nomination.)
- Wins: 96
- Nominations: 182

Chloé Zhao is a Chinese filmmaker known for her films Songs My Brothers Taught Me (2015), The Rider (2018), Nomadland (2020), Eternals (2021), and Hamnet (2025).

Zhao set many records with her 2020 film Nomadland, including becoming the first woman of color to win the Academy Award for Best Director, as well as the second woman to ever win Best Director awards from the Directors Guild of America Awards, Golden Globe Awards, and British Academy Film Awards.

With her 2025 film Hamnet, Zhao became the only director to have won the Toronto International Film Festival People's Choice Award twice, and only the second woman and the first woman of color to be nominated for the Academy Award for Best Director twice. She was also nominated alongside Maggie O'Farrell for the Academy Award for Best Adapted Screenplay.

== Major awards ==
=== Academy Awards ===
Year	Category	Nominated work	Result	Ref.
2021	Best Picture	Nomadland	Won (Note: As Producer)	
2021	Best Director	Nomadland	Won	
2021	Best Adapted Screenplay	Nomadland	Nominated	
2021	Best Film Editing	Nomadland	Nominated	
2026	Best Director	Hamnet	Nominated	
2026	Best Adapted Screenplay	Hamnet	Nominated (Note: Shared with Maggie O'Farrell)	

=== BAFTA Awards ===
Year	Category	Nominated work	Result	Ref.
British Academy Film Awards
2021	Best Film	Nomadland	Won	
2021	Best Director	Nomadland	Won	
2021	Best Adapted Screenplay	Nomadland	Nominated	
2021	Best Editing	Nomadland	Nominated	
2026	Best Director	Hamnet	Nominated	
2026	Best Adapted Screenplay	Hamnet	Nominated	
2026	Outstanding British Film	Hamnet	Won (Note: As Director)	

=== Critics' Choice Awards ===
Year	Category	Nominated work	Result	Ref.
Critics' Choice Movie Awards
2021	Best Picture	Nomadland	Won	
2021	Best Director	Nomadland	Won	
2021	Best Adapted Screenplay	Nomadland	Won	
2021	Best Film Editing	Nomadland	Nominated	
2026	Best Director	Hamnet	Nominated	
2026	Best Adapted Screenplay	Hamnet	Nominated	

=== Directors Guild of America Awards ===
Year	Category	Nominated work	Result	Ref.
2021	Outstanding Directing – Feature Film	Nomadland	Won	
2026	Outstanding Directing – Feature Film	Hamnet	Nominated	

=== Golden Globe Awards ===
Year	Category	Nominated work	Result	Ref.
2021	Best Director	Nomadland	Won	
2021	Best Screenplay	Nomadland	Nominated	
2026	Best Director	Hamnet	Nominated	
2026	Best Screenplay	Hamnet	Nominated	

=== Producers Guild of America Awards ===
Year	Category	Nominated work	Result	Ref.
2021	Best Theatrical Motion Picture	Nomadland	Won	

=== Writers Guild of America Awards ===
Year	Category	Nominated work	Result	Ref.
2026	Best Adapted Screenplay	Hamnet	Nominated	

== Other awards ==
=== ACE Eddie Awards ===
Year	Category	Nominated work	Result	Ref.
2021	Best Edited Feature Film – Dramatic	Nomadland	Nominated	
2026	Best Edited Feature Film – Dramatic	Hamnet	Nominated (Note: Shared with Affonso Gonçalves)	

=== British Independent Film Awards ===
Year	Category	Nominated work	Result	Ref.
2018	Best Foreign Independent Film	The Rider	Nominated	
2021	Best Foreign Independent Film	Nomadland	Won	

=== Gotham Awards ===
Year	Category	Nominated work	Result	Ref.
2014	Spotlight on Women Filmmakers "Live the Dream" Grant	Songs My Brothers Taught Me	Won	
2018	Audience Award	The Rider	Nominated	
2018	Best Feature	The Rider	Won	
2020	Best Feature	Nomadland	Won	
2020	Audience Award	Nomadland	Won	

=== Independent Spirit Awards ===
Year	Category	Nominated work	Result	Ref.
2016	Best First Feature	Songs My Brother Taught Me	Nominated	
2016	Someone to Watch Award	Songs My Brother Taught Me	Nominated	
2018	The BONNIE Award	—N/a	Won	
2018	Best Feature	The Rider	Nominated	
2018	Best Director	The Rider	Nominated	
2021	Best Feature	Nomadland	Won	
2021	Best Director	Nomadland	Won	
2021	Best Editing	Nomadland	Won	

=== Irish Film & Television Awards ===
Year	Category	Nominated work	Result	Ref.
2026	Best Script	Hamnet	Won	

=== NAACP Image Awards ===
Year	Category	Nominated work	Result	Ref.
2026	Outstanding Writing in a Motion Picture	Hamnet	Nominated	

=== Satellite Awards ===
Year	Category	Nominated work	Result	Ref.
2021	Best Director	Nomadland	Won	
2021	Best Adapted Screenplay	Nomadland	Nominated	
2021	Best Film Editing	Nomadland	Nominated	
2026	Best Director	Hamnet	Won	
2026	Best Adapted Screenplay	Hamnet	Nominated	
2026	Best Film Editing	Hamnet	Nominated	

=== USC Scripter Awards ===
Year	Category	Nominated work	Result	Ref.
2021	Film	Nomadland	Won	
2026	Film	Hamnet	Nominated	

== Film festival awards ==
Organizations	Year	Category	Project	Result	Ref.
BFI London Film Festival	2025	Audience Award for Best Feature	Hamnet	Won	
Buenos Aires International Festival of Independent Cinema	2018	Best Feature Film - Avant-Garde and Genre	The Rider	Nominated	
Cannes Film Festival	2015	Caméra d'Or	Songs My Brothers Taught Me	Nominated	
Cannes Film Festival	2017	Art Cinema Award	The Rider	Won	
Capri Hollywood International Film Festival	2020	Best Director	Nomadland	Won	
Chicago International Film Festival	2020	Audience Choice Award	Nomadland	Won	
Coronado Island Film Festival	2020	Leonard Maltin Tribute Award	Nomadland	Won	
Denver Film Festival	2015	Best Feature Film	Songs My Brothers Taught Me	Nominated	
Denver Film Festival	2020	Rare Pearl Award	Nomadland	Won	
Fargo Film Festival	2016	Prairie Spirit Award	Songs My Brothers Taught Me	Won	
Middleburg Film Festival	2025	Visionary Director Award	Hamnet	Won	
Mill Valley Film Festival	2025	Overall Audience Award	Hamnet	Won	
Palm Springs International Film Festival	2018	Directors to Watch	The Rider	Won	
Palm Springs International Film Festival	2020	Director of the Year	Nomadland	Won	
Palm Springs International Film Festival	2026	Vanguard Award	Hamnet (shared with actors Jessie Buckley and Paul Mescal)	Won	
Toronto International Film Festival	2020	People's Choice Award	Nomadland	Won	
Toronto International Film Festival	2025	People's Choice Award	Hamnet	Won	
Tokyo International Film Festival	2025	Kurosawa Akira Award	For extraordinary contributions to world cinema	Honoured	
Santa Barbara International Film Festival	2021	Outstanding Director of the Year	Nomadland	Won	
Sundance Film Festival	2015	Grand Jury Prize - Dramatic	Songs My Brothers Taught Me	Nominated	
Venice Film Festival	2020	Golden Lion	Nomadland	Won	
Venice Film Festival	2020	Fair Play Cinema Award	Nomadland	Won	
Venice Film Festival	2020	SIGNIS Award - Honorable Mention	Nomadland	Won	
Virginia Film Festival	2020	Best Narrative Feature	Nomadland	Won	
Virginia Film Festival	2020	American Perspectives Award	Nomadland	Won	

== Other associations ==
Award	Year	Category	Nominated work	Result	Ref.
AACTA International Awards	2021	Best Film	Nomadland	Nominated	
AACTA International Awards	2021	Best Direction	Nomadland	Won	
AACTA International Awards	2021	Best Screenplay	Nomadland	Nominated	
AACTA International Awards	2026	Best Direction	Hamnet	Nominated	
AACTA International Awards	2026	Best Screenplay	Hamnet	Nominated	
Alliance of Women Film Journalists	2021	Best Director	Nomadland	Won	
Alliance of Women Film Journalists	2021	Best Screenplay, Adapted	Nomadland	Won	
Alliance of Women Film Journalists	2021	Best Editing	Nomadland	Won	
Alliance of Women Film Journalists	2021	Best Woman Director	Nomadland	Nominated	
Alliance of Women Film Journalists	2021	Best Female Screenwriter	Nomadland	Nominated	
Alliance of Women Film Journalists	2025	Best Director	Hamnet	Nominated	
Alliance of Women Film Journalists	2025	Best Screenplay, Adapted	Hamnet	Won	
Alliance of Women Film Journalists	2025	Best Editing	Hamnet	Nominated	
Alliance of Women Film Journalists	2025	Best Woman Director	Hamnet	Won	
Alliance of Women Film Journalists	2025	Best Female Screenwriter	Hamnet	Nominated	
Astra Film Awards	2018	Best Female Director	The Rider	Nominated	
Astra Film Awards	2021	Best Female Director	Nomadland	Won	
Astra Film Awards	2021	Best Adapted Screenplay	Nomadland	Nominated	
Astra Film Awards	2021	Best Editing	Nomadland	Nominated	
Astra Film Awards	2025	Best Director	Hamnet	Nominated	
Astra Film Awards	2025	Best Adapted Screenplay	Hamnet	Nominated	
Austin Film Critics Association	2021	Best Director	Nomadland	Nominated	
Austin Film Critics Association	2021	Best Adapted Screenplay	Nomadland	Won	
Austin Film Critics Association	2021	Best Film Editing	Nomadland	Won	
Boston Online Film Critics Association	2020	Best Director	Nomadland	Won	
Boston Online Film Critics Association	2020	Best Editing	Nomadland	Won	
Boston Society of Film Critics Awards	2020	Best Director	Nomadland	Won	
Boston Society of Film Critics Awards	2020	Best Editing	Nomadland	Runner-up	
Chicago Film Critics Association	2020	Best Director	Nomadland	Won	
Chicago Film Critics Association	2020	Best Adapted Screenplay	Nomadland	Nominated	
Chicago Film Critics Association	2020	Best Editing	Nomadland	Nominated	
Chicago Film Critics Association	2025	Best Adapted Screenplay	Hamnet	Nominated	
Chlotrudis Awards	2019	Best Director	The Rider	Won	
Chlotrudis Awards	2019	Best Original Screenplay	The Rider	Nominated	
Columbus Film Critics Association	2021	Best Director	Nomadland	Won	
Columbus Film Critics Association	2021	Best Adapted Screenplay	Nomadland	Won	
Columbus Film Critics Association	2026	Best Adapted Screenplay	Hamnet	Nominated	
Dallas–Fort Worth Film Critics Association	2021	Best Director	Nomadland	Won	
Dallas–Fort Worth Film Critics Association	2025	Best Director	Hamnet	3rd place	
Detroit Film Critics Society	2020	Best Director	Nomadland	Won	
Detroit Film Critics Society	2020	Best Adapted Screenplay	Nomadland	Won	
Dorian Awards	2021	Best Director	Nomadland	Won	
Dorian Awards	2021	Best Screenplay	Nomadland	Nominated	
Dorian Awards	2021	Wilde Artist of the Year	Nomadland	Nominated	
Dorian Awards	2026	Best Director	Hamnet	Nominated	
Dorian Awards	2026	Best Screenplay	Hamnet	Nominated	
Florida Film Critics Circle Awards	2020	Best Director	Nomadland	Won	
Florida Film Critics Circle Awards	2020	Best Adapted Screenplay	Nomadland	Nominated	
Florida Film Critics Circle Awards	2025	Best Adapted Screenplay	Hamnet	Nominated	
Georgia Film Critics Association	2021	Best Director	Nomadland	Won	
Georgia Film Critics Association	2021	Best Adapted Screenplay	Nomadland	Won	
Georgia Film Critics Association	2025	Best Director	Hamnet	Nominated	
Georgia Film Critics Association	2025	Best Adapted Screenplay	Hamnet	Nominated	
Houston Film Critics Society	2021	Best Director	Nomadland	Won	
Houston Film Critics Society	2021	Best Screenplay	Nomadland	Nominated	
Houston Film Critics Society	2026	Best Director	Hamnet	Nominated	
IndieWire Critics Poll	2020	Best Director	Nomadland	Won	
Kansas City Film Critics Circle	2021	Best Director	Nomadland	Won	
Kansas City Film Critics Circle	2021	Best Adapted Screenplay	Nomadland	Won	
Kansas City Film Critics Circle	2025	Best Adapted Screenplay	Hamnet	Nominated	
Las Vegas Film Critics Society	2020	Best Director	Nomadland	Won	
London Film Critics' Circle	2021	Director of the Year	Nomadland	Nominated	
London Film Critics' Circle	2021	Screenwriter of the Year	Nomadland	Won	
London Film Critics' Circle	2026	Director of the Year	Hamnet	Nominated	
London Film Critics' Circle	2026	Screenwriter of the Year	Hamnet	Nominated	
Los Angeles Film Critics Association	2018	New Generation Award	—N/a	Won	
Los Angeles Film Critics Association	2020	Best Director	Nomadland	Won	
Minnesota Film Critics Alliance	2021	Best Picture	Nomadland	Won	
Minnesota Film Critics Alliance	2021	Best Director	Nomadland	Won	
Minnesota Film Critics Alliance	2021	Best Adapted Screenplay	Nomadland	Nominated	
Minnesota Film Critics Alliance	2026	Best Director	Hamnet	Nominated	
Minnesota Film Critics Alliance	2026	Best Adapted Screenplay	Hamnet	Nominated	
National Society of Film Critics	2019	Best Director	The Rider	3rd place	
National Society of Film Critics	2021	Best Director	Nomadland	Won	
New York Film Critics Circle	2020	Best Director	Nomadland	Won	
New York Film Critics Online	2021	Best Director	Nomadland	Won	
New York Film Critics Online	2025	Best Director	Hamnet	Nominated	
New York Film Critics Online	2025	Best Screenplay	Hamnet	Nominated	
North Dakota Film Society	2021	Best Picture	Nomadland	Won	
North Dakota Film Society	2021	Best Director	Nomadland	Won	
North Dakota Film Society	2021	Best Editing	Nomadland	Won	
North Dakota Film Society	2026	Best Director	Hamnet	Nominated	
North Dakota Film Society	2026	Best Screenplay	Hamnet	Nominated	
Online Film Critics Society	2020	Best Director	Nomadland	Won	
Online Film Critics Society	2020	Best Adapted Screenplay	Nomadland	Won	
Online Film Critics Society	2020	Best Editing	Nomadland	Won	
Online Film Critics Society	2026	Best Director	Hamnet	Nominated	
Online Film Critics Society	2026	Best Adapted Screenplay	Hamnet	Nominated	
San Diego Film Critics Society	2021	Best Director	Nomadland	Won	
San Diego Film Critics Society	2021	Best Adapted Screenplay	Nomadland	Nominated	
San Diego Film Critics Society	2025	Best Director	Hamnet	Nominated	
San Diego Film Critics Society	2025	Best Adapted Screenplay	Hamnet	Nominated	
San Diego Film Critics Society	2025	Best Editing	Hamnet	Nominated	
San Francisco Bay Area Film Critics Circle	2020	Best Director	Nomadland	Won	
San Francisco Bay Area Film Critics Circle	2020	Best Adapted Screenplay	Nomadland	Nominated	
San Francisco Bay Area Film Critics Circle	2020	Best Film Editing	Nomadland	Won	
San Francisco Bay Area Film Critics Circle	2025	Best Director	Hamnet	Nominated	
San Francisco Bay Area Film Critics Circle	2025	Best Adapted Screenplay	Hamnet	Nominated	
Seattle Film Critics Society	2020	Best Director	Nomadland	Won	
Seattle Film Critics Society	2020	Best Screenplay	Nomadland	Nominated	
Seattle Film Critics Society	2020	Best Editing	Nomadland	Won	
Seattle Film Critics Society	2025	Best Director	Hamnet	Nominated	
St. Louis Film Critics Association	2020	Best Director	Nomadland	Won	
St. Louis Film Critics Association	2020	Best Adapted Screenplay	Nomadland	Nominated	
St. Louis Film Critics Association	2020	Best Editing	Nomadland	Won	
St. Louis Film Critics Association	2025	Best Director	Hamnet	Nominated	
St. Louis Film Critics Association	2025	Best Adapted Screenplay	Hamnet	Nominated	
Toronto Film Critics Association	2021	Best Director	Nomadland	Won	
Toronto Film Critics Association	2021	Best Screenplay	Nomadland	Nominated	
Toronto Film Critics Association	2025	Best Adapted Screenplay	Hamnet	Runner-up	
Vancouver Film Critics Circle	2021	Best Director	Nomadland	Won	
Vancouver Film Critics Circle	2026	Best Director	Hamnet	Nominated	
Vancouver Film Critics Circle	2026	Best Screenplay	Hamnet	Nominated	
Washington D.C. Area Film Critics Association	2020	Best Director	Nomadland	Won	
Washington D.C. Area Film Critics Association	2020	Best Adapted Screenplay	Nomadland	Won	
Washington D.C. Area Film Critics Association	2020	Best Editing	Nomadland	Nominated	
Washington D.C. Area Film Critics Association	2025	Best Director	Hamnet	Nominated	
Washington D.C. Area Film Critics Association	2025	Best Adapted Screenplay	Hamnet	Nominated	
Washington D.C. Area Film Critics Association	2025	Best Editing	Hamnet	Nominated	

== Academy Award nominated performances from Zhao movies ==
Directed Academy Award performances
Under Zhao's direction, these actors have received Academy Award wins and nominations for their performances in their respective roles.

Year	Performer	Film	Result
Academy Award for Best Actress
2020	Frances McDormand	Nomadland	Won
2025	Jessie Buckley	Hamnet	Won
