= Charlene Swankie =

American vandweller

- Born: 1944 or 1945 (age 81–82)
- Other name: Swankie
- Citizenship: United States
- Education: Indiana University Bloomington; Ball State University
- Known for: Appearing in Nomadland (2020) as herself

Charlene Swankie (born 1944/1945) is an American vandweller. She appeared as a fictionalised version of herself ("Swankie") in the 2020 American drama film Nomadland.

== Personal life ==
Swankie attended Arsenal Technical High School in Indianapolis, graduating in 1962. In 1970 she became a single parent of two young boys, and lived on minimal child support. Later she attended Indiana University Bloomington, where she studied Park and Recreation Administration/Natural Resource Management, and graduated 1980. She then completed a master's degree in archaeology at Ball State University, and graduated in 1993.

Much later, in 2009, faced with financial problems, Swankie moved into her van and purposefully began her life as a nomad at the age of 64, taking on occasional seasonal work. She says the lifestyle involves "downsizing, owning nothing but what [people] have with them and leaving an exceedingly small carbon footprint".

She enjoys kayaking, and has kayaked all fifty states of the United States. As of 2021 she had no plans to return to a "normal life", and believed that as a result of living as a nomad, she was much healthier than she had been as a younger woman.

=== Appearance in Nomadland ===
Swankie appeared as a fictionalised version of herself ("Swankie") in Nomadland, a film written, produced and directed by Chloé Zhao. The film is based on a 2017 book, Nomadland: Surviving America in the Twenty-First Century, written by journalist Jessica Bruder, in which Swankie also appears. Swankie's appearance in the film was celebrated, and the film received critical acclaim and achieved box office success, winning many awards including the Golden Lion at the Venice Film Festival, People's Choice Award at Toronto International Film Festival, three Academy Awards for Best Picture, Best Director and Best Actress (the latter for Frances McDormand who plays the lead role of Fern, a displaced widow) two awards including Best Motion Picture – Drama at the Golden Globe Awards, and four awards at both the British Academy Film Awards and the 36th Independent Spirit Awards.

Swankie had initially been skeptical about appearing as herself as a non-professional actor in the film. She portrayed a woman with terminal cancer who is fiercely independent, and found it an emotional experience because her late husband had died from cancer, and because she genuinely perceived herself as a loner, unaccustomed to asking others for help. Alongside Swankie, other real-life nomads also appeared as "non-actors", playing fictionalised versions of themselves, including Bob Wells and Linda May. Both Swankie and May "deliver powerful monologues about finding hope". Director Zhao described Swankie as "sharp and energetic".

After having been paid the same as any other actor would be, Swankie donated $10,000 of her earnings from the film to a fund through the Bill Cook Foundation, to help build schoolrooms in South Sudan.
