= Van-dwelling =

Lifestyle of living in a vehicle as a permanent housing

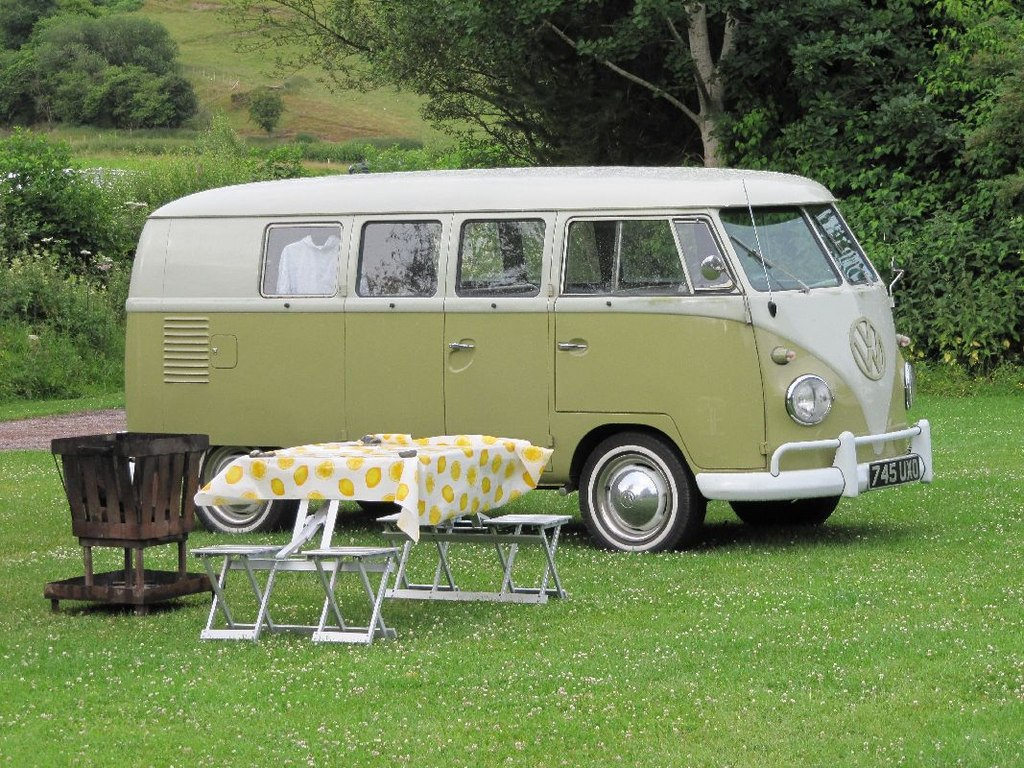
A table by a Volkswagen Type 2, a vehicle commonly used for van-dwelling

Van-dwelling, van life, or vanlife is an unconventional lifestyle of living in a car, van, or other motor vehicle. A person who lives in such a manner, either on a full or part-time basis, is known as a vanlifer, van dweller, car dweller, or vehicle dweller. People who live this way by choice are typically seeking a more self-sufficient lifestyle characterized by freedom and mobility. They may perceive it as being a less regulated form of housing, or one that offers a lower cost advantage over standard housing, especially in regions susceptible to housing shortages, but in turn incurs car costs. Other vehicle dwellers may be on the verge of homelessness or living in a homeless shelter, with their vehicle serving as their only source of shelter and permanent residence.

In the late 2010s, an idealized version was popularized through social media with the hashtag #vanlife, which gained significant momentum during the COVID-19 pandemic.

== Etymology ==
Van-dwelling is a compound word that denotes the fact that motor vehicle living takes place typically, but not exclusively, in a van. Many different types of motor vehicles have been used for vandwelling, either permanently or only on a temporary basis.

A person who engages in van dwelling is known as a van dweller, car dweller or vehicle dweller. Sometimes, a car dweller is known as a car sleeper. If the residence is temporary, it may be referred to as car camping. Cars (including SUVs and cargo vans but typically not pickup trucks) with the seats folded flat/down and a mattress placed inside are referred to as "床车" in China, which literally translates to "bed car".

== History ==
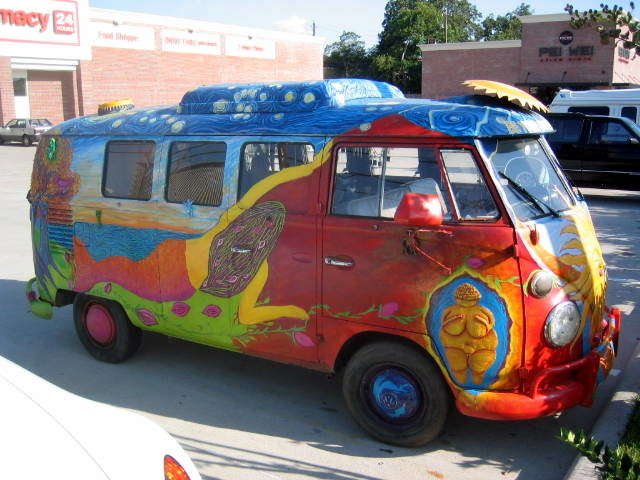
A 1967 VW Kombi bus decorated with hippie style hand-painting

The history of vandwelling goes back to horse-drawn vehicles, such as Roma vardo wagons in Europe and prairie schooner in the United States. One of the first uses of the term "vandwellers" was in the United Kingdom Showman and Van Dwellers' Protection Association, a guild for travelling show performers formed in 1889. Shortly afterwards in 1901, Albert Bigalow Paine wrote The Van Dwellers, about people living on the verge of poverty having to live a nomadic life in horse-drawn moving vans. After the introduction of motorised vehicles, the modern form of vandwelling began. Mobile wheeled homes became popular in the US following the Great Depression in the mid-1930s as house trailers first entered mass production. This expanded availability beyond the domain of hobbyists and small-batch builders. A New York Times article in 1936 described "hundreds of thousands of families [who] have packed their possessions into traveling houses, said goodbye to their friends, and taken to the open road." Through 1960, approximately 1.5–2 million Americans acquired house trailers. In the 1960s this trend ended with the development of mobile homes, less expensive but less mobile alternatives to the earlier traveling houses.

The hippie trail was an overland journey popular among hippies and adventurers from the mid-1950s to the late 1970s, spanning from Western Europe to West and South Asia, with travelers seeking to explore these regions cheaply while interacting with locals. It largely ended due to the Iranian Revolution and the Soviet invasion of Afghanistan in the late 1970s.

== Legality ==
=== United States ===
In the US, individuals who lack a permanent address and stable living situation, including vandwellers, are technically considered "homeless". A 2018 study found that approximately 25% of homeless people in Seattle were living in a vehicle. Of the 60,000 homeless people in Los Angeles in 2019, approximately 25% were reportedly living in a vehicle. However, a 2020 study found that this number was in reality closer to 50%.

Many municipalities have laws prohibiting overnight parking and/or sleeping in vehicles. In Los Angeles, living in a vehicle is prohibited on most streets. The city has municipal codes regarding times and places where someone is authorized to live in a vehicle. Non-profit organizations in a number of California cities sponsor "safe parking" initiatives, which offer limited facilities and some security in designated Safe Parking lots. Some vandwellers have parked in Walmart and Cracker Barrel parking lots. In the Western United States, the Bureau of Land Management allows vandwellers and other campers to remain in many areas of their vast administration for up to 14 days at a time.

== Lifestyle ==
The vandwelling lifestyle can allow for significant autonomy and a lower cost of living than having a mortgage or lease as in a more traditional living arrangement, but it can also be expensive and limiting compared to living in an ordinary building. Assuming they have the means, vandwellers are free to travel as much or little as they would like. Some vandwellers choose to remain in one general area, and work full-time or attend school while living in their vehicles. Others travel full-time while working remotely via the Internet or finding seasonal or short-term employment opportunities in various locations.

Since vandwelling consists of living in a vehicle with a footprint no larger than a parking space, there is usually little to no space for bathing or doing laundry. Some vandwellers in the US use gym memberships to access showers.

=== #vanlife on social media ===
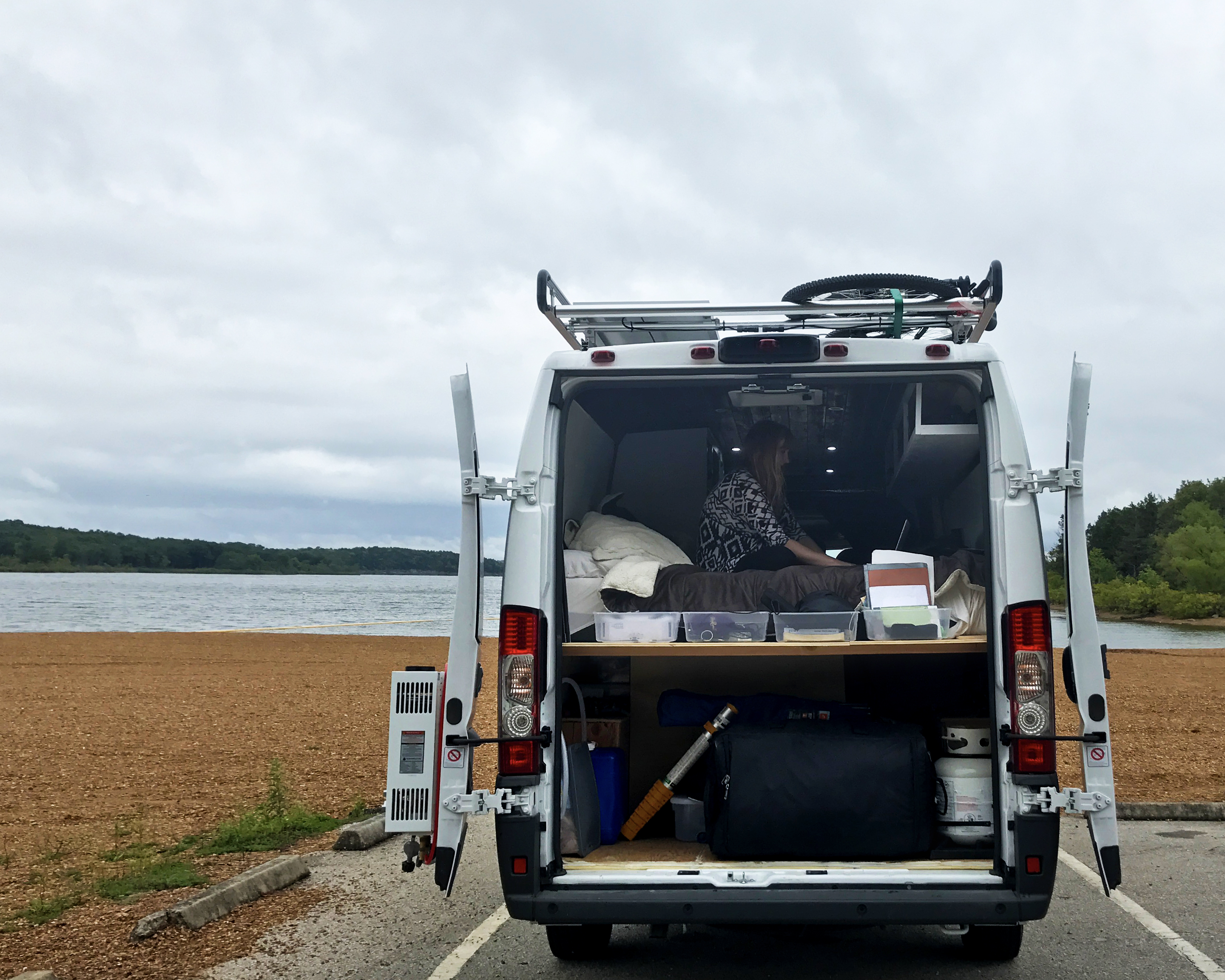
Converted Ram Promaster 3500 with four 100 watt solar panels

Various depictions of the van dwelling lifestyle are presented on YouTube and Instagram, using the hashtag #vanlife — ranging from starkly realistic appraisals to heavily idealistic depictions.

The hashtag #vanlife was first used and popularized by a photoblogger named Foster Huntington in 2011. Many depictions illustrate idyllic natural scenery, sometimes framed by the open back doors of the van, or with the van prominently visible in the landscape. Others depictions feature spotless, stylized interior views of the living space. The people pictured in the images might be young, attractive and outdoorsy millennials. The depictions are often set in natural areas, particularly in the Western US as well as coastal or mountainous regions of Europe, New Zealand, or Australia.

Other notable contributors to the #vanlife movement include the Vanlife Diaries. In 2019, the founders of Vanlife Diaries published a book called vanlife diaries: finding freedom on the open road which pulled content from its blog and Instagram.

During the COVID-19 pandemic, some social media users promoted the #vanlife lifestyle as a way to stay safe and avoid illness. The movement attracted many newcomers to the lifestyle including younger and more diverse people than the initial promoters of the lifestyle.

A less idealized, more stark depiction was presented in the 2021 film Nomadland.

== Vehicle modifications ==
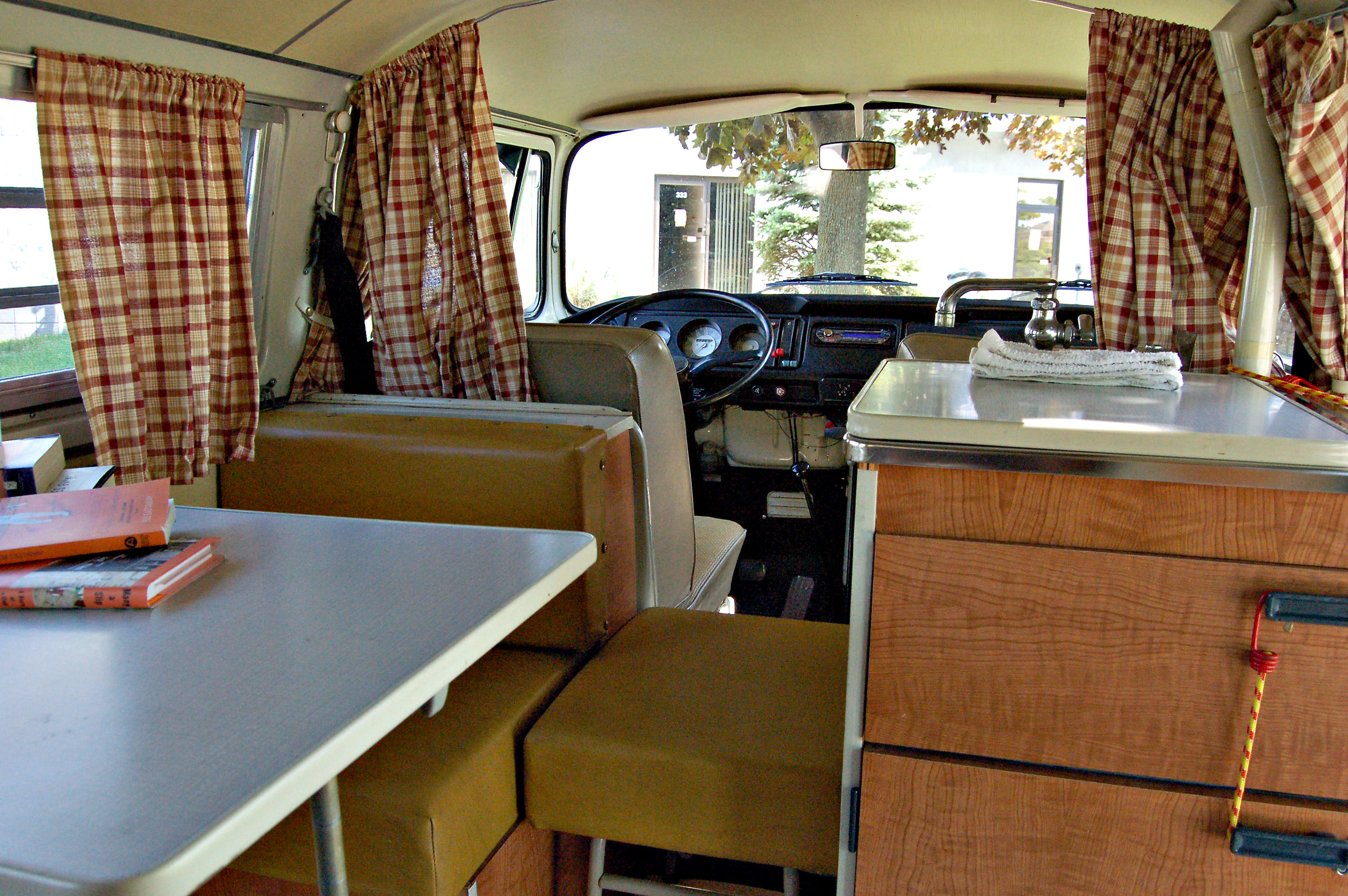
1970 Volkswagen camper interior

Van conversions consist of a wide range of possibilities. A conversion can be as simple as a few personal items thrown in the back, such as a sleeping bag or folding bed along with a few pieces of clothing, while using only the engine battery for power. It escalates all the way up to vans that function like micro-apartments on wheels with complex power setups, a kitchenette, and even simple plumbing. Vehicles like the Volkswagen Westfalia, a regular passenger van, or a cargo van, can be modified for day-to-day living by a professional conversion company. Upscale van conversion can provide most of the amenities of a conventional home including heating, air conditioning, a house battery system, a two-burner stove, a permanent bed, and other conveniences that make the vehicle fit for full-time living. School bus modifications ("skoolies") are also common among vandwellers.

== Communication ==
Since many vandwellers lack a permanent address, they sometimes use mail forwarding services, instead of a simple post office box, in order to receive packages and other mail. This is beneficial because the forwarder can then send packages to an address which the vandweller can access. Vandwellers often pay their bills and conduct business online through the use of public Wi-Fi, which they can access at libraries or in eateries such as Starbucks.

== Employment ==
Vandwellers will usually work seasonal jobs, ranging from national parks to warehouse jobs. Some vandwellers work only part of the year then use the money earned to travel.

Vandwellers have been known to be digital nomads who work remotely from workplace or have a job that does not require working at location. Alternatively, some vandwellers have permanent employment at Silicon Valley tech companies and choose to live in a van to both save on high rents and take advantage of generous company perks that include free food, on-site showers, and laundry service.

Jobs that rely on motor vehicles, such as cargo delivery, food delivery, taxi, bus, tour guide, tradie or handyman.

== In popular culture ==
Actor Chris Farley's character Matt Foley would often describe himself "living in a van down by the river" in Saturday Night Live sketches.

== Notable vandwellers ==
- Adam the Woo, American YouTuber and travel vlogger
- Jessica Bruder, American journalist
- Alex Honnold, American rock climber
- Gabby Petito, American crime victim
- Charlene Swankie, American vandweller
- Steve Wallis, Canadian YouTuber
- Bob Wells, American vandweller

== See also ==
- Affordable housing
- Alternative housing
- Conversion van
- Friggebod
- Glamping
- Housetrucker
- Mobile home
- Overlanding
- New age travellers
- Optibo
- Recreational vehicles
- Safe parking lots
- Shipping container architecture
- Summer house
- Tiny house movement
- Truck sleeper
