= HOWA =

HOWA or Howa may refer to:

- Howa, a Japanese machinery and firearms manufacturer
- Homes on Wheels Alliance, an American 501(c)(3) nonprofit organization dedicated to alleviating homelessness through van-dwelling
