= AACTA International Award for Best Supporting Actress =

Australian film award

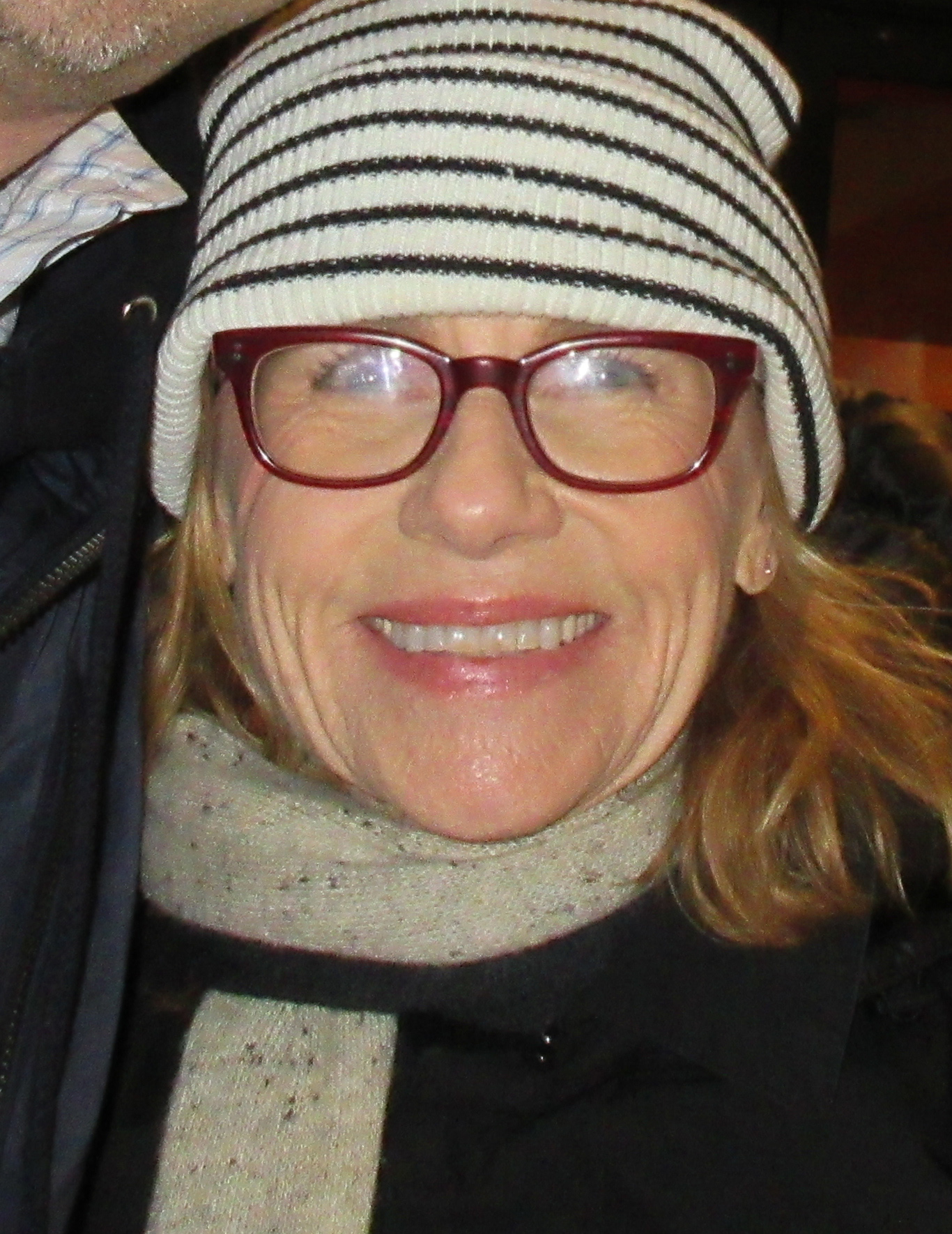
- The 2025 recipient: Amy Madigan
- Country: Australia
- Presented by: Australian Academy of Cinema and Television Arts (AACTA)
- First award: 2012
- Currently held by: Amy Madigan, Weapons (2025)
- Website: http://www.aacta.org

The AACTA International Award for Best Supporting Actress is an accolade given by the Australian Academy of Cinema and Television Arts (AACTA), a non-profit organisation whose aim is to "identify, award, promote, and celebrate Australia's greatest achievements in film and television". The award is presented at the annual AACTA International Awards, which rewards achievements in feature films, regardless of the country the film was made. The winners and nominees are determined by the international chapter of the Academy, which comprises eighty members of Australian film-makers and executives. It was first handed out by the Academy in 2013 (for films released in 2012) as a discretionary prize, with Jacki Weaver being the first recipient.

== Winners and nominees ==
In the following table, the years listed correspond to the year of film release; the ceremonies are held the following year. The actress in bold and in dark blue background have received a special award; those in bold and in yellow background have won a regular competitive award. Those that are neither highlighted nor in bold are the nominees. When sorted chronologically, the table always lists the winning actress first, and then the other nominees.

Winner of a competitive award
Winner of a discretionary award
- † - indicates a winner of the Academy Award for Best Supporting Actress
- ‡ - indicates a nominee for the Academy Award for Best Supporting Actress

=== 2010s ===
Year	Actress	Film	Role
**2012** (2nd)
**2012** (2nd)	**Jacki Weaver** ‡	**Silver Linings Playbook**	**Dolores Solitano**
**2013** (3rd)
**2013** (3rd)	**Jennifer Lawrence** ‡	**American Hustle**	**Rosalyn Rosenfeld**
**2013** (3rd)	Sally Hawkins ‡	Blue Jasmine	Ginger
**2013** (3rd)	Lupita Nyong'o †	12 Years a Slave	Patsey
**2013** (3rd)	Julia Roberts ‡	August: Osage County	Barbara Weston-Fordham
**2013** (3rd)	Octavia Spencer	Fruitvale Station	Wanda Johnson
**2014** (4th)
**2014** (4th)	**Patricia Arquette** †	**Boyhood**	**Olivia Evans**
**2014** (4th)	Keira Knightley ‡	The Imitation Game	Joan Clarke
**2014** (4th)	Emma Stone ‡	Birdman	Sam Thomson
**2014** (4th)	Meryl Streep ‡	Into the Woods	The Witch
**2014** (4th)	Naomi Watts	Birdman	Lesley Truman
**2015** (5th)
**2015** (5th)	**Rooney Mara** ‡	**Carol**	**Therese Belivet**
**2015** (5th)	Judy Davis	The Dressmaker	Molly Dunnage
**2015** (5th)	Jennifer Jason Leigh ‡	The Hateful Eight	Daisy Domergue
**2015** (5th)	Alicia Vikander †	The Danish Girl	Gerda Wegener
**2015** (5th)	Kate Winslet ‡	Steve Jobs	Joanna Hoffman
**2016** (6th)
**2016** (6th)	**Nicole Kidman** ‡	**Lion**	**Sue Brierley**
**2016** (6th)	Viola Davis †	Fences	Rose Maxson
**2016** (6th)	Naomie Harris ‡	Moonlight	Paula
**2016** (6th)	Teresa Palmer	Hacksaw Ridge	Dorothy Schutte
**2016** (6th)	Michelle Williams ‡	Manchester by the Sea	Randi
**2017** (7th)
**2017** (7th)	**Allison Janney** †	**I, Tonya**	**LaVona Golden**
**2017** (7th)	Mary J. Blige ‡	Mudbound	Florence Jackson
**2017** (7th)	Abbie Cornish	Three Billboards Outside Ebbing, Missouri	Anne Willoughby
**2017** (7th)	Nicole Kidman	The Killing of a Sacred Deer	Anna Murphy
**2017** (7th)	Laurie Metcalf ‡	Lady Bird	Marion McPherson
**2018** (8th)
**2018** (8th)	**Nicole Kidman**	**Boy Erased**	**Nancy Eamons**
**2018** (8th)	Amy Adams ‡	Vice	Lynne Cheney
**2018** (8th)	Emily Blunt	A Quiet Place	Evelyn Abbott
**2018** (8th)	Claire Foy	First Man	Janet Shearon Armstrong
**2018** (8th)	Margot Robbie	Mary Queen of Scots	Queen Elizabeth I
**2019** (9th)
**2019** (9th)	**Margot Robbie** ‡	**Bombshell**	**Kayla Pospisil**
**2019** (9th)	Toni Collette	Knives Out	Joni Thrombey
**2019** (9th)	Nicole Kidman	Bombshell	Gretchen Carlson
**2019** (9th)	Florence Pugh ‡	Little Women	Amy March
**2019** (9th)	Margot Robbie	Once Upon a Time in Hollywood	Sharon Tate

=== 2020s ===
Year	Actress	Film	Role
**2020** (10th)
**2020** (10th)	**Olivia Colman** ‡	**The Father**	**Anne**
**2020** (10th)	Maria Bakalova ‡	Borat Subsequent Moviefilm	Tutar Sagdiyev
**2020** (10th)	Saoirse Ronan	Ammonite	Charlotte Murchison
**2020** (10th)	Amanda Seyfried ‡	Mank	Marion Davies
**2020** (10th)	Charlene Swankie	Nomadland	Swankie
**2021** (11th)
**2021** (11th)	**Judi Dench** ‡	**Belfast**	**Granny**
**2021** (11th)	Caitríona Balfe	Belfast	Ma
**2021** (11th)	Cate Blanchett	Don't Look Up	Brie Evantee
**2021** (11th)	Kirsten Dunst ‡	The Power of the Dog	Rose Gordon
**2021** (11th)	Sally Hawkins	Spencer	Maggie
**2022** (12th)
**2022** (12th)	**Kerry Condon** ‡	**The Banshees of Inisherin**	**Siobhán Súilleabháin**
**2022** (12th)	Jamie Lee Curtis †	Everything Everywhere All at Once	Deirdre Beaubeirdre
**2022** (12th)	Olivia DeJonge	Elvis	Priscilla Presley
**2022** (12th)	Stephanie Hsu ‡	Everything Everywhere All at Once	Joy Wang / Jobu Tupaki
**2022** (12th)	Jean Smart	Babylon	Elinor St. John
**2023** (13th)
**2023** (13th)	**Vanessa Kirby**	**Napoleon**	**Empress Joséphine**
**2023** (13th)	Da'Vine Joy Randolph †	The Holdovers	Mary Lamb
**2023** (13th)	Julianne Moore	May December	Gracie
**2023** (13th)	Penélope Cruz	Ferrari	Laura Ferrari
**2023** (13th)	Rosamund Pike	Saltburn	Lady Elspeth Catton
**2024** (14th)
**2024** (14th)	**Zoe Saldaña** †	**Emilia Pérez**	**Rita Mora Castro**
**2024** (14th)	Toni Collette	Juror No. 2	Faith Killebrew
**2024** (14th)	Ariana Grande ‡	Wicked	Galida "Glinda" Upland
**2024** (14th)	Felicity Jones ‡	The Brutalist	Erzsébet Tóth
**2024** (14th)	Alison Steadman	Better Man	Betty
**2025** (15th)
**2025** (15th)	**Amy Madigan** †	**Weapons**	**Gladys**
**2025** (15th)	Glenn Close	Wake Up Dead Man	Martha Delacroix
**2025** (15th)	Elle Fanning ‡	Sentimental Value	Rachel Kemp
**2025** (15th)	Mia Goth	Frankenstein	Lady Elizabeth Harlander / Baroness Claire Frankenstein
**2025** (15th)	Emily Watson	Hamnet	Mary Shakespeare

== See also ==
- AACTA Awards
- AACTA Award for Best Actress in a Supporting Role
