= Seattle Film Critics Society Award for Best Director =

Award given by the Seattle Film Critics Society

The Seattle Film Critics Society Award for Best Director is one of the annual awards given by the Seattle Film Critics Society.

== Winners and nominees ==
indicates the winners.

† indicates the winner of the Academy Award for Best Director.

=== 2010s ===
Year	Director	Film
2016
2016	Barry Jenkins	Moonlight
2016	Damien Chazelle †	La La Land
2016	Robert Eggers	The Witch
2016	Paul Verhoeven	Elle
2016	Denis Villeneuve	Arrival
2017
2017	Christopher Nolan	Dunkirk
2017	Sean Baker	The Florida Project
2017	Greta Gerwig	Lady Bird
2017	Jordan Peele	Get Out
2017	Denis Villeneuve	Blade Runner 2049
2018
2018	Alfonso Cuarón †	Roma
2018	Bradley Cooper	A Star Is Born
2018	Barry Jenkins	If Beale Street Could Talk
2018	Yorgos Lanthimos	The Favourite
2018	Paul Schrader	First Reformed
2019
2019	Bong Joon-ho †	Parasite
2019	Robert Eggers	The Lighthouse
2019	Greta Gerwig	Little Women
2019	Josh Safdie and Benny Safdie	Uncut Gems
2019	Martin Scorsese	The Irishman

=== 2020s ===
Year	Director	Film
2020
2020	Chloé Zhao †	Nomadland
2020	Lee Isaac Chung	Minari
2020	Emerald Fennell	Promising Young Woman
2020	Steve McQueen	Lovers Rock
2020	Kelly Reichardt	First Cow
2021
2021	Ryusuke Hamaguchi	Drive My Car
2021	Jane Campion †	The Power of the Dog
2021	Julia Ducournau	Titane
2021	David Lowery	The Green Knight
2021	Denis Villeneuve	Dune
2022
2022	Daniel Kwan and Daniel Scheinert †	Everything Everywhere All at Once
2022	Todd Field	Tár
2022	Joseph Kosinski	Top Gun: Maverick
2022	Martin McDonagh	The Banshees of Inisherin
2022	Charlotte Wells	Aftersun
2023
2023	Martin Scorsese	Killers of the Flower Moon
2023	Greta Gerwig	Barbie
2023	Yorgos Lanthimos	Poor Things
2023	Christopher Nolan	Oppenheimer
2023	Celine Song	Past Lives
