= Steve Wallis =

Canadian YouTuber (born 1981)

- Born: Steven Wallis; Vancouver, British Columbia, Canada
- Occupation: YouTuber

YouTube information
- Channel: Steve Wallis
- Years active: 2010–present
- Genres: Camping; outdoor cooking; vlog
- Subscribers: 2.15 million
- Views: 386 million
- Last updated: 14 Sept 2026
- Website: campingwithsteve.com

Steve Wallis is a Canadian YouTuber and independent filmmaker. He is primarily known for his videos about camping, stealth camping, and outdoor recreation without expensive gear.

== Early life ==
Steve Wallis was born in Vancouver, British Columbia. For a period of time as a young man, he was living in an RV in Victoria without electricity, water, or sewage hookups (boondocking) out of necessity.

== Career ==
Wallis is the proprietor of a heating company. Upon first becoming acquainted with YouTube, he assumed that the platform was a forum for posting viral joke videos. After posting a video of himself camping in −32 °C weather, and seeing the enthusiastic response it garnered in the comments section, he decided to focus on creating more of this type of content. Since its creation on 19 April 2010, his YouTube channel has focused on boondocking, van-dwelling, urban stealth camping, and yard camping; and activities such as panning for gold and practicing survival skills in natural environments. Many of his projects are centred on "taking back camping for the people" and see him camping in parking lots, starting fires with hand sanitizer, and avoiding expensive camping equipment.

In 2017, he released his documentary film, Boondocking, which he wrote and directed. By 2023, he worked full-time on Camping with Steve, which includes AdSense profits, merchandise sales, and supporter donations. He does not do corporate sponsorships.

He also enjoys drinking a beer after he has set up camp, which he refers to as "step two" of his process. As of July 2020, Wallis posted weekly videos on Thursdays with 15–25 minute videos of "setting up camp, getting the fire ready, preparing [his] meal, going to bed, waking up, breaking down camp, and heading out".

In August 2022, Wallis’s wife of 5 years, Jessica Audrey Hatton, died in her sleep at the age of 31. He often referred to her as “Beautiful Wife” in his videos and made a video talking about her after her death, in which his fans gave thoughts, prayers and condolences during that time. He is a resident of Alberta.
