= Nomadland: Surviving America in the Twenty-First Century =

2017 book by Jessica Bruder

- First edition cover
- Author: Jessica Bruder
- Language: English
- Subject: Great Recession, poverty, social issues
- Genre: Nonfiction
- Publisher: W. W. Norton & Company
- Publication date: September 2017
- Publication place: United States
- Media type: Print, e-book
- Pages: 273
- ISBN: 978-0-393-24931-6 (First edition hardcover)
- OCLC: 971352344
- Dewey Decimal: 331.3/980973
- LC Class: HD6280 .B77 2017

Nomadland: Surviving America in the Twenty-First Century is a 2017 nonfiction book by American journalist Jessica Bruder about the phenomenon of older Americans who, following the Great Recession from 2007 to 2009, adopted transient lifestyles traveling around the United States in search of seasonal work (vandwelling).

The book was adapted into the 2020 film of the same name, which was awarded the Academy Award for Best Picture.

== Awards ==
The book was named a "Notable Book" by The New York Times, was a finalist for the J. Anthony Lukas Prize and the Helen Bernstein Book Award, and won the Barnes & Noble Discover Great New Writers Award for Nonfiction and the international Ryszard Kapuściński Award.

== Reception ==
Kirkus review stated: "Journalist Bruder... expands her remarkable cover story for Harper’s into a book about low-income Americans eking out a living while driving from locale to locale for seasonal employment... Engaging, highly relevant immersion journalism." Timothy R. Smith of The Denver Post wrote, "Bruder, who teaches at the Columbia University Graduate School of Journalism, writes in an evenhanded, impartial tone, avoiding polemicism. She does, however, insert herself into the narrative, sometimes intrusively... Her instinct to get out of the way is wise. The people she meets and the stories they tell are powerful in their own right." Joe Martin of Real Change commented, "Bruder’s narrative provides an entrée into the lives of resilient Americans meeting challenges with courage and humor. In the nomad world, Bruder encounters an array of appealing characters. They are portrayed with respect and admiration. Some have become friends for whom she has a deep affection."

== In other media ==
In 2017, the book was adapted into a short documentary film, CamperForce, on which Bruder served as producer alongside director Brett Story and executive producer Laura Poitras.

In February 2019, Fox Searchlight Pictures announced that the book had been optioned by Frances McDormand and Peter Spears. Adapted and directed by Chloé Zhao, the 2020 film starred McDormand and David Strathairn, alongside Linda May, Charlene Swankie, and Bob Wells, three vandwellers featured in the book. The film received critical acclaim, receiving four nominations at the 78th Golden Globe Awards, winning two: Best Motion Picture – Drama and Best Director – Motion Picture for Zhao. Nominated for seven prizes at the 74th BAFTA Awards, the film won four in April 2021, including Best Picture and Best Director. The film earned six nominations at the 93rd Academy Awards, winning Best Picture, Best Director for Zhao, and Best Actress for McDormand.
