= 2020 Los Angeles Film Critics Association Awards =

Annual US film awards ceremony

46th LAFCA Awards
- Date: December 20, 2020

Highlights
- Best Picture: Small Axe

The 46th Los Angeles Film Critics Association Awards, given by the Los Angeles Film Critics Association (LAFCA), honored the best in film for 2020.

== Winners ==
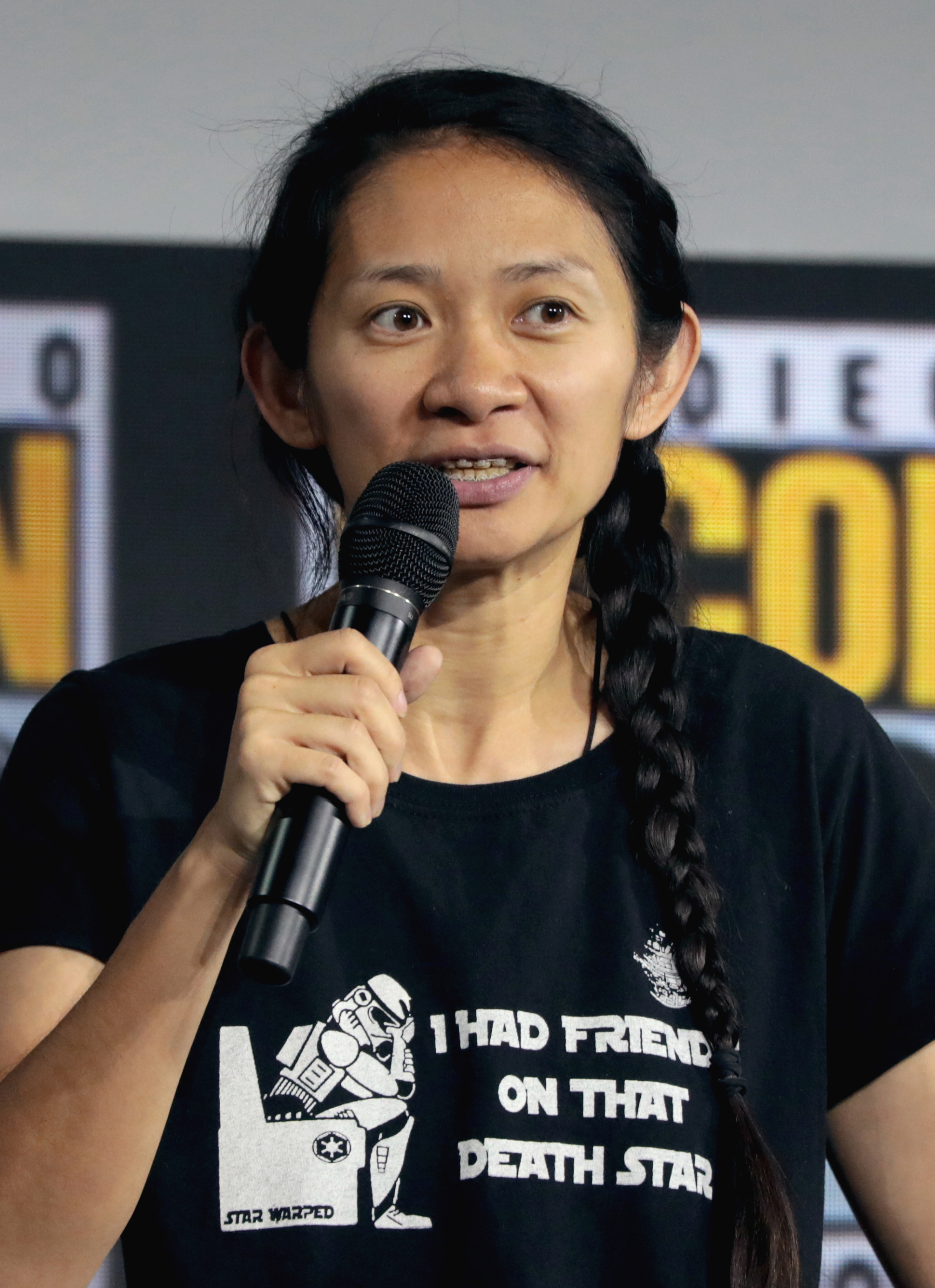
Chloé Zhao, Best Director winner

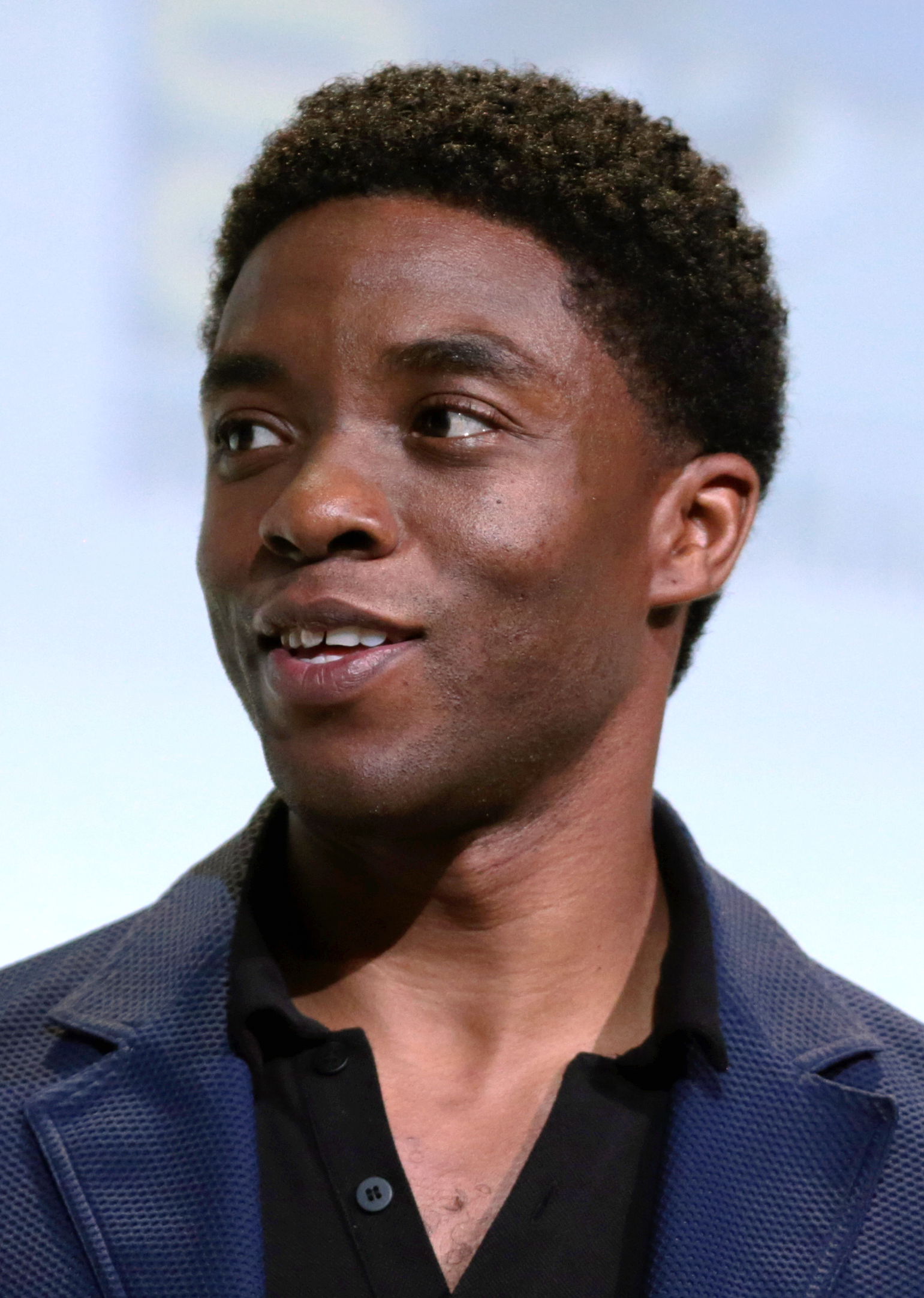
Chadwick Boseman, Best Actor winner

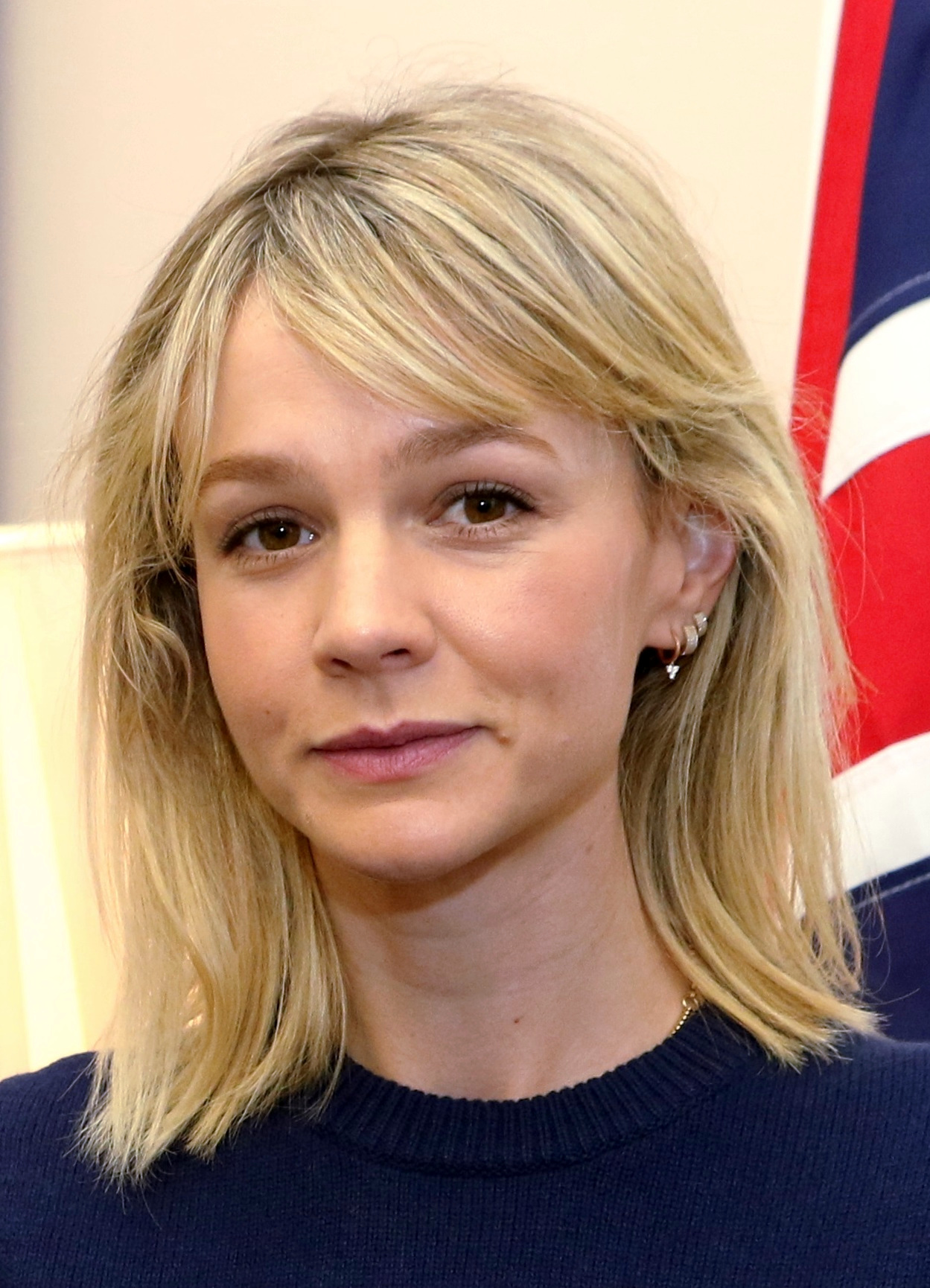
Carey Mulligan, Best Actress winner

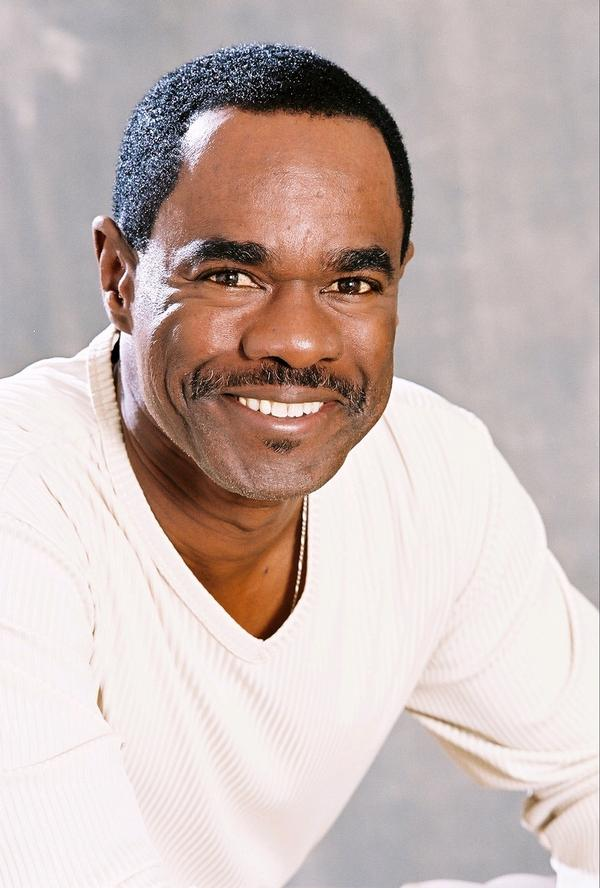
Glynn Turman, Best Supporting Actor winner

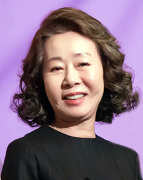
Youn Yuh-jung, Best Supporting Actress winner

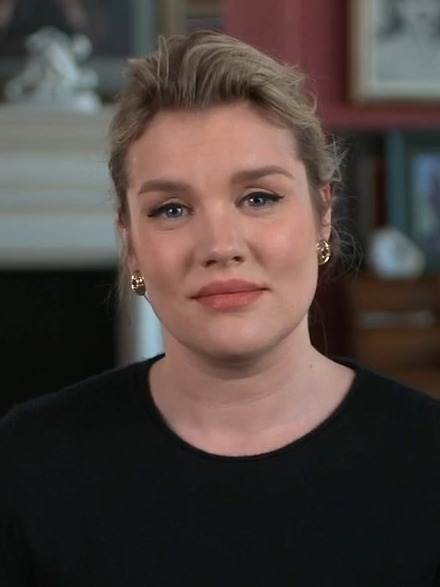
Emerald Fennell, Best Screenplay winner

- Best Film:
  - Small Axe
    - Runner-up: Nomadland
- Best Director:
  - Chloé Zhao – Nomadland
    - Runner-up: Steve McQueen – Small Axe
- Best Actor:
  - Chadwick Boseman – Ma Rainey's Black Bottom
    - Runner-up: Riz Ahmed – Sound of Metal
- Best Actress:
  - Carey Mulligan – Promising Young Woman
    - Runner-up: Viola Davis – Ma Rainey's Black Bottom
- Best Supporting Actor:
  - Glynn Turman – Ma Rainey's Black Bottom
    - Runner up: Paul Raci – Sound of Metal
- Best Supporting Actress:
  - Youn Yuh-jung – Minari
    - Runner-up: Amanda Seyfried – Mank
- Best Screenplay:
  - Emerald Fennell – Promising Young Woman
    - Runner-up: Eliza Hittman – Never Rarely Sometimes Always
- Best Cinematography:
  - Shabier Kirchner – Small Axe
    - Runner-up: Joshua James Richards – Nomadland
- Best Editing:
  - Yorgos Lamprinos – The Father
    - Runner-up: Gabriel Rhodes – Time
- Best Production Design:
  - Donald Graham Burt – Mank
    - Runner-up: Sergey Ivanov – Beanpole
- Best Music Score:
  - Trent Reznor and Atticus Ross – Soul
    - Runner-up: Mica Levi – Lovers Rock
- Best Foreign Language Film:
  - Beanpole
    - Runner-up: Martin Eden
- Best Documentary/Non-Fiction Film:
  - Time
    - Runner-up: Collective
- Best Animation:
  - Wolfwalkers
    - Runner-up: Soul
- New Generation Award:
  - Radha Blank – The Forty-Year-Old Version
- Career Achievement Award:
  - Harry Belafonte and Hou Hsiao-hsien
- The Douglas Edwards Experimental/Independent Film/Video Award:
  - John Gianvito – Her Socialist Smile
- Legacy Award:
  - Norman Lloyd
