= Coronado Island Film Festival =

Annual American film festival

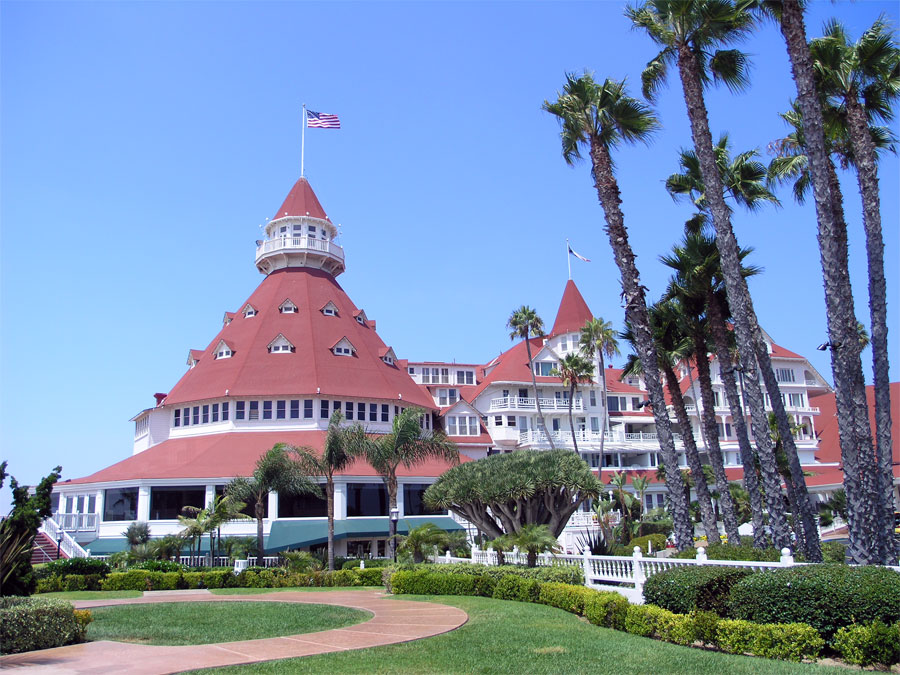
- CIFF Venue Hotel del Coronado
- Location: Coronado, California, United States
- Founded: 2015
- Language: English
- Website: coronadofilmfest.com

The Coronado Island Film Festival (CIFF) is an annual film festival held in Coronado, California, a resort city across San Diego Bay from downtown San Diego.

== Location ==
It consists of a four-day festival in November – and a monthly year-round "Classic Movie Series" – at venues across the island including the Hotel Del Coronado, once known as Hollywood's playground.

== History ==
Film critic and author Leonard Maltin has served as Honorary Head Juror since the inaugural event in 2016.

On November 11, 2018, Jack Lemmon's son Chris, an actor and entertainer in his own right, fell seriously ill due to a lung condition at the festival. He was unable to accept an award on behalf of his father at the Hotel Del Coronado because he had to receive an immediate double lung transplant.

=== Notable films ===
The first opening night film in 2015 was The Finest Hours starring Chris Pine. In 2017, Darkest Hour starring Gary Oldman opened the festival. In 2021, notable films included C'mon C'mon (Opening Night), King Richard (Centerpiece) and Julia (Closing Night). In 2021, Pig and 7 Days won the Audience and Jury awards respectively. In 2022, the audience award for Best Narrative Feature went to She Said. In 2023, Robot Dreams won the audience award for Best Animated Feature.

=== Notable appearances ===
Notable attendees and award winners include Jaqueline Bisset, Elegance Bratton, Ron Shelton, Cloris Leachman, Nancy Utley, Richard Dreyfuss, Diane Warren, Michelle Philips, Stephen Bishop, Jacob Tremblay, Ann Blyth, Jacqueline Bissett, Geena Davis, Andy García, Vanna White, musicians Stephen Bishop and Vince Giordano, author/Navy Seal Marcus Luttrell, Mayes Rubeo, Gabriel Beristain and Tim Reid. Posthumous honorees represented by family members have included Jack Lemmon, Gene Kelly and Errol Flynn.

== Awards ==
Founded in 2016, The Festival offers awards in several categories called "Hubbells" named after its sculptor James Hubbell. Cash awards called "Hubbells" in three categories:

- The Dale St. Denis Award that honors the Best Woman Filmmaker;
- The Dr. George Sanger Award that honors the Best Student Film; and
- The Ken Fitzgerald and Ruby Carr Emerald Award.

=== The Leonard Maltin Tribute Award ===
On November 14, 2020, the festival announced a new top award, presented by Leonard Maltin, to director Chloé Zhao for "groundbreaking achievement" on her film Nomadland. In 2022, the award was presented to Bull Durham director Ron Shelton. In 2025, Delroy Lindo received the award in recognition of his performance in Sinners.
