= Boston Society of Film Critics Awards 2020 =

Annual US film awards ceremony

41st BSFC Awards

December 13, 2020

Best Film:
Nomadland

The 41st Boston Society of Film Critics Awards, honoring the best in filmmaking in 2020, were given on December 13, 2020.

== Winners ==
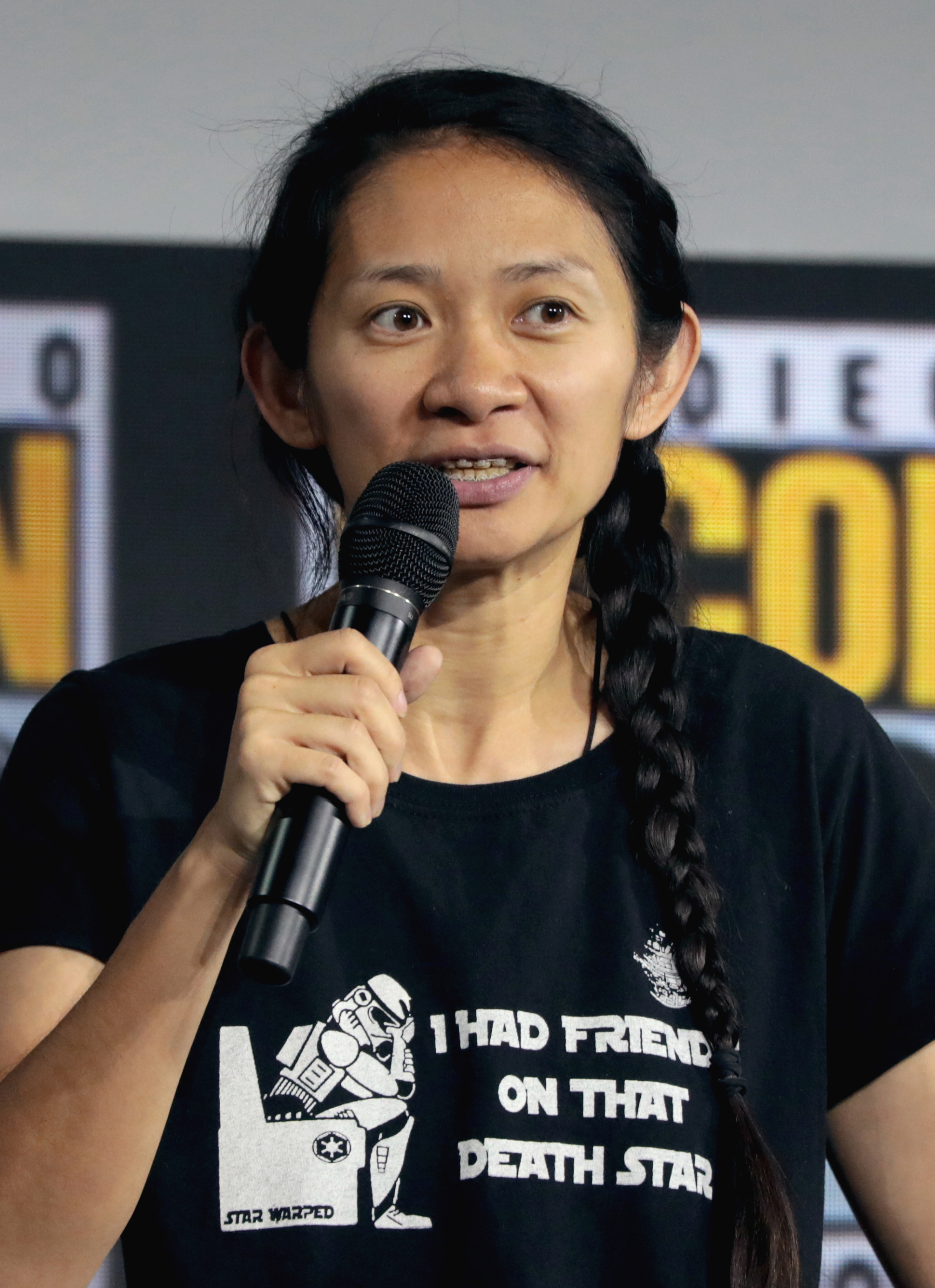
Chloé Zhao, Best Director winner

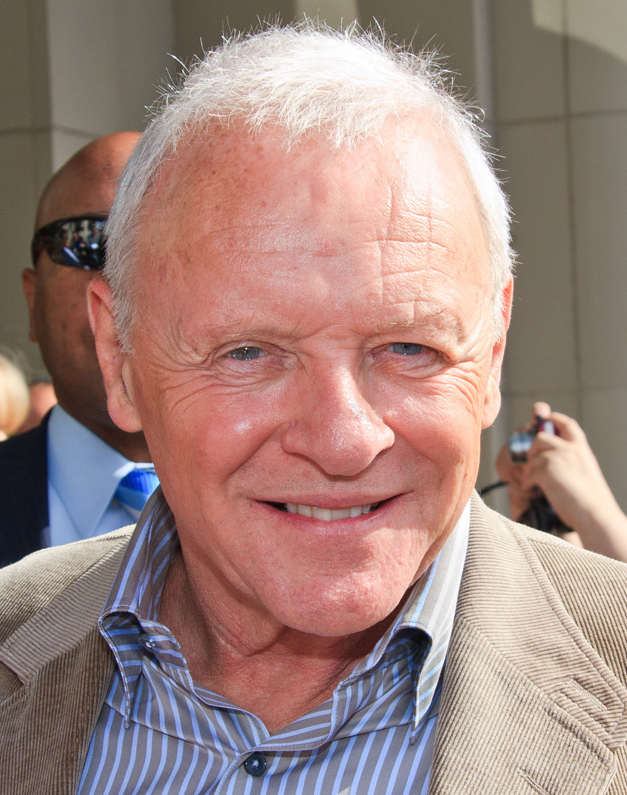
Anthony Hopkins, Best Actor winner

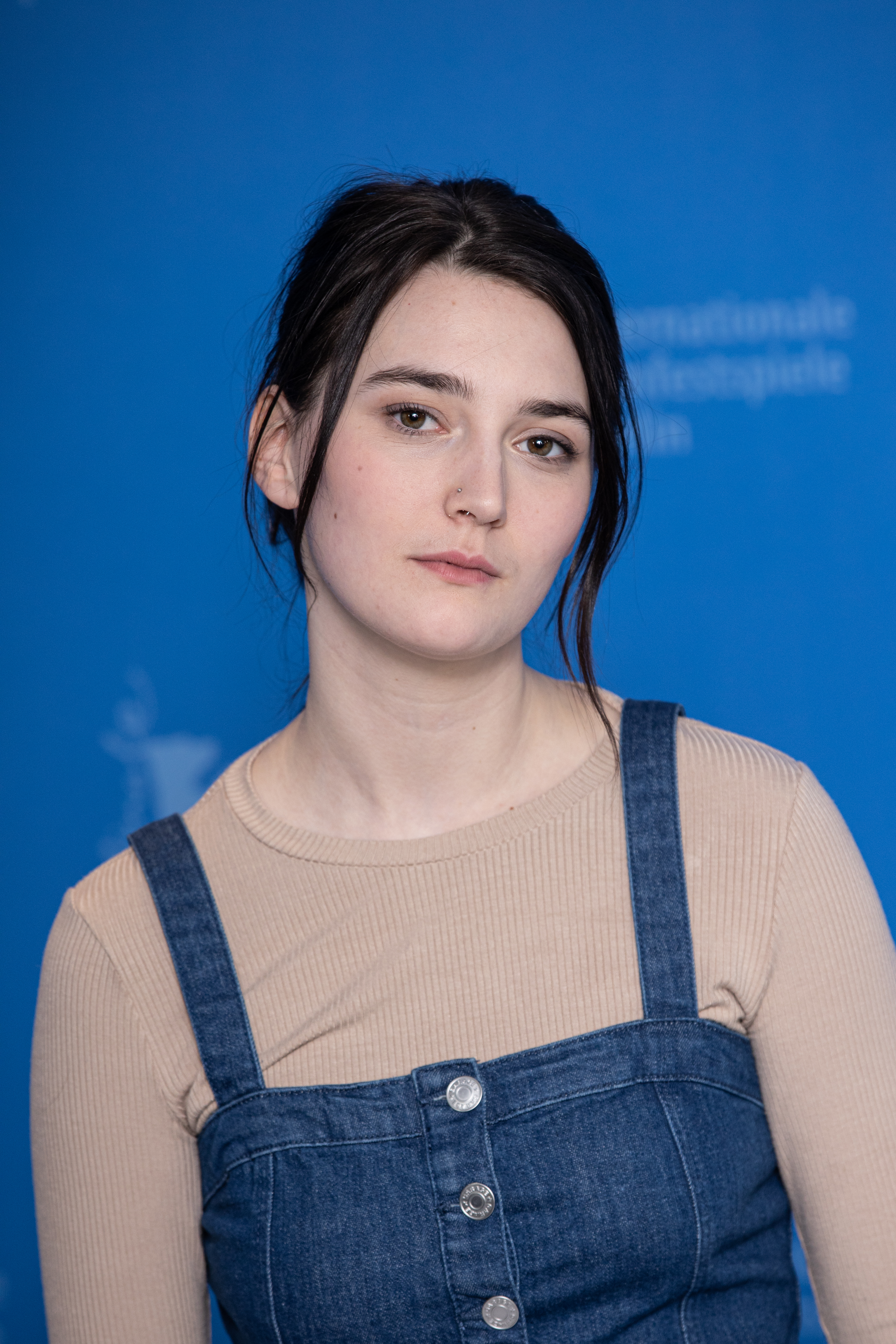
Sidney Flanigan, Best Actress winner

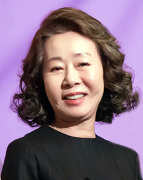
Youn Yuh-jung, Best Supporting Actress winner

- Best Film:
  - Nomadland
    - Runner-up: First Cow
- Best Director:
  - Chloé Zhao – Nomadland
    - Runner-up: Kelly Reichardt – First Cow
- Best Actor:
  - Anthony Hopkins – The Father
    - Runner-up: Riz Ahmed – Sound of Metal
- Best Actress:
  - Sidney Flanigan – Never Rarely Sometimes Always
    - Runner-up: Julia Garner – The Assistant
- Best Supporting Actor:
  - Paul Raci – Sound of Metal
    - Runner-up: Brian Dennehy – Driveways (posthumous)
- Best Supporting Actress:
  - Youn Yuh-jung – Minari
    - Runner-up: Amanda Seyfried – Mank
- Best Screenplay:
  - Charlie Kaufman – I'm Thinking of Ending Things
    - Runner-up: Jonathan Raymond and Kelly Reichardt – First Cow
- Best Animated Film:
  - The Wolf House
    - Runner-up: Wolfwalkers
- Best Documentary:
  - Collective
    - Runner-up: The Painter and the Thief
- Best Non-English Language Film:
  - La Llorona
    - Runner-up: The Painted Bird
- Best Cinematography:
  - Joshua James Richards – Nomadland
    - Runner-up: Shabier Kirchner – Lovers Rock
- Best Film Editing:
  - Robert Frazen – I'm Thinking of Ending Things
    - Runner-up: Chloé Zhao – Nomadland
- Best Original Score:
  - Emile Mosseri – Minari
    - Runner-up: Trent Reznor and Atticus Ross – Mank
- Best New Filmmaker:
  - Florian Zeller – The Father
    - Runner-up: Autumn de Wilde – Emma
- Best Ensemble Cast:
  - Ma Rainey's Black Bottom
    - Runner-up: Minari
