= Jessica Bruder =

American journalist

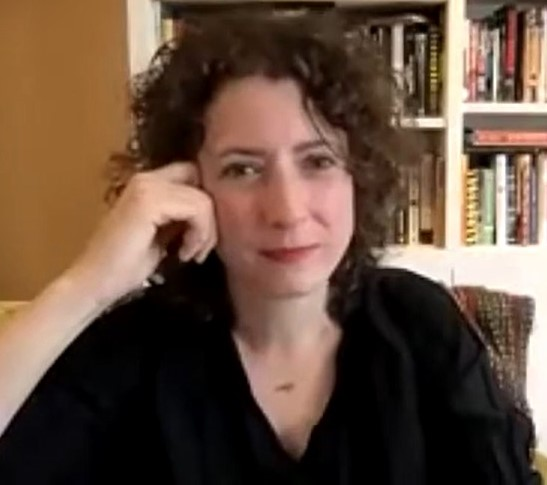
- Bruder in 2021
- Education: Amherst College; Columbia University
- Occupation: Journalist
- Website: www.jessicabruder.com

Jessica L. Bruder is an American journalist who writes about subcultures and teaches narrative writing at Columbia Journalism School.

== Early life ==
Bruder grew up in Montclair, New Jersey, after moving with her family from Clifton, New Jersey. She attended Montclair Kimberley Academy. She graduated from Amherst College in 2000 and received a master's in journalism from Columbia University in 2005.

== Work ==
=== Writing ===
Bruder has written for The New York Times since 2003. She worked in The Oregonian's now-closed Clackamas County bureau for nearly two years between 2006 and 2008, primarily covering breaking news, crime and the courts. She has also written for Wired, New York and Harper's Magazine. Her first book was Burning Book: A Visual History of Burning Man. She also produced the film CamperForce, directed by Brett Story.

For her book Nomadland: Surviving America in the Twenty-First Century (2017), she spent months living in a camper van named Van Halen, documenting itinerant Americans who gave up traditional housing to hit the road full-time. The project spanned three years and more than 15,000 miles of driving, from coast to coast and from Mexico to the Canadian border. Named a New York Times 2017 Notable Book, Nomadland won the 2017 Barnes & Noble Discover Award, and was a finalist for the J. Anthony Lukas Prize and the Helen Bernstein Book Award.

=== Film ===
In February 2019, Fox Searchlight Pictures announced that they would distribute the film adaptation of Nomadland, also titled Nomadland, which had been optioned by Frances McDormand and Peter Spears. David Strathairn, Linda May and Charlene Swankie joined McDormand in the cast of the film, and Chloé Zhao directed from a screenplay she wrote based on the book. McDormand, Spears, Mollye Asher, Dan Janvey and Zhao produced the Searchlight film. The film was a critical success and won numerous accolades, including the Academy Award for Best Picture.
