= Bob Wells (vandweller) =

American vandweller, YouTuber and writer

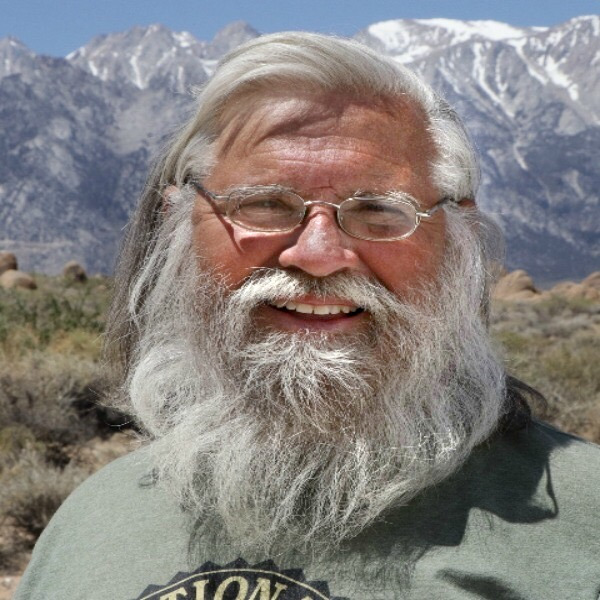
- Born: Robert Wells; 1955 or 1956 (age 70–71)
- Occupations: YouTuber, author
- Years active: 2005–present

YouTube information
- Channel: CheapRVliving
- Years active: 2015–present
- Genre: Fulltiming
- Subscribers: 859 thousand
- Views: 235.7 million
- Last updated: August 21, 2026
- Website: cheaprvliving.com

Bob Wells (born 1955) is an American YouTuber and author. Known for his advocacy of nomadic vandwelling as a form of affordable minimalist living, he founded the Rubber Tramp Rendezvous, an annual gathering of van dwellers in Quartzsite, Arizona, and the Homes on Wheels Alliance, a charity that converts vehicles for needy individuals to live and travel in.

== Early life ==
Wells's father, who worked as a union clerk at a Safeway grocery store in Anchorage, Alaska, died two years after reaching retirement. Finding himself employed in the same store—and wanting to avoid his father's inability to enjoy retirement—Wells moved into a box van in 1995 purchased with his last $1,500 after working for 20 years at the store. The experience, which occurred during the aftermath of a difficult divorce with two children, left Wells crying himself to sleep. After six years, he remarried, moved into a house, and relocated with his wife to North Carolina, but eventually went back to living in a vehicle full-time. After he and his second wife divorced, Wells began living in a truck camper, followed by a work van and a four-wheel-drive ambulance.

== Advocacy ==
In 2005, after seeing a mother and her three children sleeping in a car, Wells created the website cheaprvliving.com to provide tips, resources, and strategies for living in a vehicle. He plays himself in the 2020 film adaptation of the book Nomadland: Surviving America in the Twenty-First Century.

=== Rubber Tramp Rendezvous ===
As of 2024, Wells organized a get-together of vehicle dwellers in Quartzsite, Arizona each January known as the Rubber Tramp Rendezvous (RTR). (Note: The term "rubber tramp" refers to a person who lives in a vehicle, which uses rubber tires.) Attendees and other followers of the event are known as "The Tribe". The gathering itself has been described as Burning Man for retirees. During its first year in 2010, the RTR had 45 attendees. By 2018, it had attracted over 3,000 participants and by 2019 it had attracted 10,000—making it the largest gathering of its kind in the world. Activities include seminars on vehicle dwelling, ranging from city and stealth-parking, repair and improvement seminars (e.g., installing solar panels), identifying resources such as inexpensive vision and dental care (e.g., in Los Algodones, or Baja California, Mexico) to locating free secondhand items.

=== YouTube ===
In 2015, Wells started a YouTube channel called CheapRVliving to offer how-to videos, interviews with other vandwellers, and philosophical videos inspired by noted authors and thinkers. By May 2019, the channel was approaching 50 million views.

=== Homes on Wheels Alliance ===
In October 2018, Wells announced the creation of Homes on Wheels Alliance, a 501(c)(3) charity of which he is the president. Based in Pahrump, Nevada, the organization helps those with housing insecurity by acquiring vehicles and having volunteers convert them into a habitable space.

== Works ==
- How to Live In a Car, Van or RV: And Get Out of Debt, Travel, and Find True Freedom, CreateSpace Independent Publishing Platform, 2014 ISBN 1479215899
