= Nomadland =

2020 film by Chloé Zhao

- Theatrical release poster
- Directed by: Chloé Zhao
- Screenplay by: Chloé Zhao
- Based on: Nomadland: Surviving America in the Twenty-First Century by Jessica Bruder
- Produced by: Frances McDormand; Peter Spears; Mollye Asher; Dan Janvey; Chloé Zhao
- Starring: Frances McDormand; David Strathairn; Linda May; Charlene Swankie
- Cinematography: Joshua James Richards
- Edited by: Chloé Zhao
- Music by: Ludovico Einaudi
- Production companies: Highwayman; Hear/Say Productions; Cor Cordium Productions
- Distributed by: Searchlight Pictures
- Release dates: September 11, 2020 (Venice); February 19, 2021 (United States)
- Running time: 108 minutes
- Country: United States
- Language: English
- Budget: $5 million
- Box office: $39.5 million

Nomadland is a 2020 American drama film written, directed, edited and co-produced by Chloé Zhao. Based on the 2017 nonfiction book Nomadland: Surviving America in the Twenty-First Century by Jessica Bruder, it stars Frances McDormand as a widow who leaves her life in Nevada to drift around the United States in her van. A number of real-life nomads appear as fictionalized versions of themselves, including Linda May, Swankie, and Bob Wells. David Strathairn also stars in a supporting role.

Nomadland premiered on September 11, 2020, at the Venice Film Festival, where it won the Golden Lion. It also won the People's Choice Award at the Toronto International Film Festival. It had a one-week streaming limited release on December 4, 2020, and was distributed by Searchlight Pictures in selected IMAX theaters in the United States on January 29, 2021, and simultaneously in theaters, and streaming digitally on Hulu, on February 19, 2021. The film was critically acclaimed and a box-office success, grossing $39 million worldwide against its $5 million budget.

At the 93rd Academy Awards, the film won Best Picture, Best Director, and Best Actress for McDormand, from a total of six nominations. Zhao became the second woman and first Asian woman to win Best Director, and the first to be nominated in four categories in a single year. McDormand became the first woman and fourth person to win Academy Awards for both acting and producing, and the first person to win Academy Awards as producer and performer for the same film. It is also the first Searchlight release to win Best Picture since the studio's ownership under Walt Disney Studios, following Disney's acquisition of the 21st Century Fox assets. It also won Best Motion Picture – Drama and Best Director at the 78th Golden Globe Awards, four awards including Best Film at the 74th British Academy Film Awards, and four awards, including Best Film, at the 36th Independent Spirit Awards. It has since been cited as one of the best films of the 2020s and the 21st century.

== Plot ==
In 2011, Fern loses her job after the closure of the US Gypsum plant in Empire, Nevada; she had worked there for years along with her husband, who recently died. Fern sells most of her belongings for a van to live in and travels the country searching for work. She takes a seasonal job at an Amazon warehouse in the winter.

Linda, a friend and co-worker, invites Fern to visit a desert rendezvous in Arizona organized by Bob Wells, which provides a support system and community for fellow nomads. Fern initially declines, but changes her mind as the weather turns cold and she struggles to find work. There, she meets fellow nomads and learns basic survival and self-sufficiency skills for the road.

When Fern's van blows a tire, she visits the van of a nearby nomad, Swankie, to ask for a ride into town to buy a spare. Swankie chastises Fern for being unprepared and invites her to learn road survival skills; they become friends. Swankie tells Fern about her cancer diagnosis, short life expectancy, and plan to make good memories on the road rather than waste away in a hospital. They eventually part ways.

Fern takes a job as a camp host at the Cedar Pass Campgrounds in Badlands National Park in South Dakota. Also working there is Dave, another nomad she met and danced with at the desert community. When he falls ill with diverticulitis, she visits him at the hospital where he has had emergency surgery. They take restaurant jobs at Wall Drug in South Dakota. One night, Dave's son visits the restaurant looking for him, telling him his wife is pregnant and asking him to meet his grandchild. He is hesitant, but Fern encourages him to go. Dave suggests that she come with him, but she declines.

Fern takes a new job at a sugar beet processing plant, but her van breaks down, and she cannot afford the repairs. Unable to borrow money, she visits her sister's family at their home in California. Fern's sister lends her the money to get the van fixed. She questions why Fern was never in their lives and stayed in Empire after her husband died, but tells Fern she is brave to be so independent. Fern later visits Dave and his son's family in Point Arena, California, learning that Dave has decided to stay with them long-term. He admits to having feelings for her and invites her to stay with him permanently in a guest house, but she leaves after only a few days, heading to the ocean.

Fern resumes her seasonal job at Amazon and returns to the Arizona gathering. There, she learns that Swankie has died, and she and the other nomads pay tribute to her life by tossing stones into the campfire. Fern opens up to Bob about her loving relationship with her late husband, and he shares the story of his son's suicide. Bob espouses the view that goodbyes are not final in the nomad community as its members always promise to see each other again "down the road".

Fern returns to the nearly abandoned town of Empire to dispose of the belongings she has been keeping in a storage unit. She visits the factory and the home she shared with her husband before returning to the road.

== Cast ==
- Frances McDormand as Fern
- David Strathairn as Dave
- Linda May as Linda
- Charlene Swankie as Swankie
- Bob Wells as Bob Wells
- Peter Spears as Peter
- Derek Endres as Derek
- Tay Strathairn as James
- Gay DeForest as Gay
- Patricia Grier as Patty
- Angela Reyes as Angela
- Carl R. Hughes as Carl
- Douglas G. Soul as Doug
- Ryan Aquino as Ryan
- Teresa Buchanan as Teresa
- Karie Lynn McDermott Wilder as Karie
- Brandy Wilber as Brandy
- Makenzie Etcheverry as Makenzie
- Annette Webb as Annette
- Rachel Bannon as Rachel
- Bryce Bedsworth as Bryce
- Sherita Deni Coker as Deni
- Merle Redwing as Merle
- Forrest Bault as Forrest
- Suanne Carlson as Suanne
- Donnie Miller as Donnie
- Roxanne Bay as Roxy
- Matt Sfaelos as Noodle
- Ronald O. Zimmerman as Ron
- Paige Dean as Paige
- Paul Winer as Paul
- Derrick Janis as Victor
- Greg Barber as Greg
- Carol Anne Hodge as Carol
- Matthew Stinson as Nurse Matt
- Terry Phillip as Terry
- Bradford Lee Riza as Brad
- Cat Clifford as Cat
- James R. Taylor Jr. as James
- Jeremy Greenman as Jeremy
- Ken Greenman as Ken
- Melissa Smith as Dolly
- Warren Keith as George
- Jeff Andrews as Jeff
- Paul Cunningham as Paul
- Emily Jade Foley as Emily
- Mike Sells as Mike
- Cheryl Davis as Cheri
- Aubrey Etcheverry as Aubrey

== Production ==
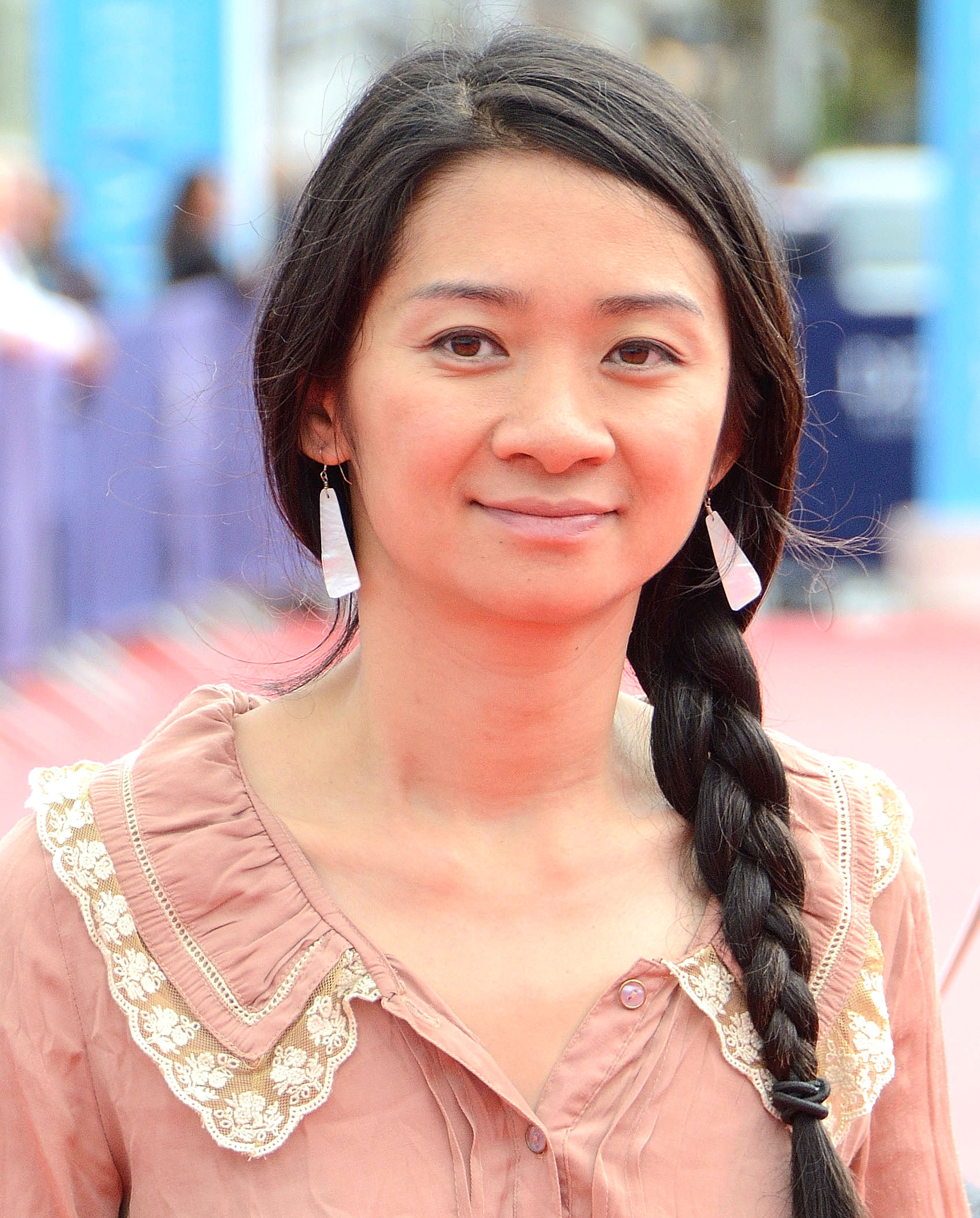
Director Chloé Zhao

Frances McDormand and Peter Spears optioned the book's film rights in 2017. After seeing Chloé Zhao's film The Rider at the 2017 Toronto International Film Festival, McDormand approached her about the project. She and Spears met with Zhao at the 33rd Independent Spirit Awards in March 2018, and Zhao agreed to write and direct the film.

Filming Nomadland took four months in late 2018, with Zhao splitting time between the set and pre-production for Eternals (2021). McDormand, Zhao, and other crew members lived out of vans during production. David Strathairn and real-life nomads Linda May, Swankie, and Bob Wells also star. Many other real-life nomads appear in the film. McDormand, Spears, Mollye Asher, Dan Janvey, and Zhao produced the film.

== Soundtrack ==
There is an official soundtrack for the film.

=== Songs and author ===
- "What Child Is This?", written by William Chatterton Dix
- "Rubber Ring", written by Steven Morrissey and Johnny Marr
- "Home Is a Question Mark", written by Steven Morrissey and Alain Whyte
- "White Christmas", written by Irving Berlin
- "The Twelve Days of Christmas", written by Frederic Austin
- "Oltremare (Divenire)", written and performed by Ludovico Einaudi
- "Struttin' Easy Peasy", written by Stephen Edwards
- "On the Road Again", written by Willie Nelson
- "Quartzsite Vendor Blues", written and performed by Donald Miller
- "Getting Back with Me", written and performed by Donald Miller
- "Tequila", written by Danny Flores
- "Rose Garden", written by Joe South
- "It Wasn't God Who Made Honky Tonk Angels", written by Joseph D. Miller
- "Foot Stompin' Banjo", written by Stephen Edwards
- "Epilogue", written and performed by Ólafur Arnalds
- "Answer Me, My Love", written by Carl Sigman, Fred Rauch, and Gerhard Winkler
- "Next to the Track Blues", written and performed by Paul Winter
- "Petricor (Elements)", written and performed by Ludovico Einaudi
- "I Love This Bar", written by Toby Keith and Scotty Emerick
- "Coal Miner's Daughter", written and performed by Loretta Lynn
- "Tumbling Tumbleweeds", written by Bob Nolan
- "Golden Butterflies (Seven Days Walking, Day One)", written and performed by Ludovico Einaudi
- "Low Mist (Seven Days Walking, Day Three)", written and performed by Ludovico Einaudi
- "Drifting Away I Go", written and performed by Cat Clifford
- "Return of the Grievous Angel", written by Gram Parsons and Thomas Brown
- "Dave's Song", written and performed by Tay Strathairn
- "Gravity (Seven Days Walking, Day Three)", written and performed by Ludovico Einaudi
- "Low Mist (Seven Days Walking, Day One)", written and performed by Ludovico Einaudi
- "Drifting Away I Go", written and performed by Cat Clifford

== Release ==
Searchlight Pictures (then named Fox Searchlight Pictures) acquired the worldwide distribution rights for Nomadland in February 2019. The film had its world premiere at the 77th Venice International Film Festival on September 11, 2020, and screened at the 2020 Toronto International Film Festival later that day. At Venice, the film won several awards, including the festival's top honor, the Golden Lion. At Toronto, the film won the People's Choice Award. It is the first film to win the top prize at both Venice and Toronto.

In association with Searchlight, Film at Lincoln Center held exclusive virtual screenings of the film for one week only beginning on December 4, 2020, the film's initial release date before Searchlight delayed it to February 19, 2021, due to the COVID-19 pandemic. It was released in IMAX theaters on January 29, 2021, with a wide theatrical and drive-in release in the United States on February 19, and streaming on Hulu the same day. A two-week preview season in certain regions of Australia and New Zealand began on December 26, 2020, before a wider release on March 4, 2021.

Nomadland was released on Disney+ on April 9, 2021, in Canada, and April 30, 2021, in most other countries. Though originally scheduled for a limited release in China starting on April 23, 2021, the film went unreleased after facing censorship due to questions of Zhao's citizenship and unfavorable things she had said in the past about China.

Nomadland was released on Blu-ray and digital streaming services on April 27, 2021, by Walt Disney Studios Home Entertainment.

== Reception ==
=== Box office ===
Nomadland grossed $3.7 million in the United States and Canada, and $35.4 million in other territories, for a worldwide total of $39.1 million.

Although Searchlight did not publicly release Nomadland's grosses, it was released in North America the same day as The Little Things, and sources estimated a gross of $170,000 from its two-week IMAX run and $503,000 from 1,175 theaters in its wide opening weekend on February 19, for a total of $673,000. Social media monitor RelishMix noted online audience response was "mixed-to-leaning-positive". In its second wide release weekend, it earned an estimated $330,000 from 1,200 theaters, for a four-week total of $1.1 million.

=== Critical response ===
Frances McDormand's performance received critical acclaim, earning her the Academy Award for Best Actress.

Review aggregator website Rotten Tomatoes reports that 93% of 442 critic reviews were positive, with an average rating of 8.8/10. The website's critics consensus reads, "A poetic character study on the forgotten and downtrodden, Nomadland beautifully captures the restlessness left in the wake of the Great Recession." According to Metacritic, which assigned it a weighted average score of 89 out of 100 based on 55 critics, the film received "universal acclaim".

In The Hollywood Reporter, David Rooney called the film a "powerful character study", adding, "Like Zhao's earlier work, Nomadland is an unassuming film, its aptly meandering, unhurried non-narrative layering impressions rather than building a story with the standard markers. But the cumulative effect of its many quiet, seemingly inconsequential encounters and moments of solitary contemplation is a unique portrait of outsider existence." Adrian Horton of The Guardian wrote, "Nomadland has garnered industry praise as a likely frontrunner for the best picture Oscar ... The word of mouth is warranted." A.O. Scott of The New York Times wrote, "It's like discovering a new country, one you may want to visit more than once." Eric Kohn of IndieWire gave the film an A−, writing, "director Chloé Zhao works magic with McDormand's face and the real world around it, delivering a profound rumination on the impulse to leave society in the dust." Some reviewers felt the film idealized financial despair. Critic Tim Brayton called it "108 minutes of poverty tourism"; WBUR's Sean Burns wrote, "Zhao has made The Grapes of Wrath without the wrath".

Filmmaker Barry Jenkins said of Zhao: "There's a meticulousness to her craft, and yet it also feels kind of free. I think people watch her work, and they first assume, 'Oh, they just showed up and things just happened.' But I know what it takes to get this framing and that framing. I think there's this idea of things just happening, but there's also the craft involved in knowing a place, getting there, understanding the light, and then creating an environment for your actors to just do this wonderful thing they do."

IndieWire's poll of 231 critics included Nomadland in its Best Movies of 2020. According to Metacritic, the film was ranked the best of 2020 by critics more often than any other. In 2022, Time Out ranked it tenth on its list of "The 100 Best Movies of the 21st century So Far", saying that the film "expertly stitches together realism, moments of sheer transcendence and a lightly-worn radicalism in a way that feels nothing but unpatronizing and empathetic." In August 2023, Collider ranked the film 13th on its list of "The 20 Best Drama Movies of the 2020s So Far", calling it "a moving portrayal of the American nomadic lifestyle" and McDormand's character, Fern, "endearing ... because of her self-confidence, but it never feels like she's attempting to impose her choice of lifestyle on anyone else." In 2025, it was one of the films voted for the "Readers' Choice" edition of The New York Times' list of "The 100 Best Movies of the 21st Century," finishing at number 312.

McDormand loudly howled toward the ceiling when accepting the Oscar for Best Picture, which drew confusion from many audience members and press outlets. She later explained she did this to honor the film's sound mixer, Michael "Wolf" Snyder, who had died shortly before the film's release.

=== Reaction in China ===
According to western media, Zhao and the film's success leading up to the Golden Globes and the Oscars were initially praised on Chinese social media outlets, as well as official state-controlled news media.

After the Golden Globes, Zhao was scrutinized by Chinese netizens over her remarks in a 2013 interview for Filmmaker magazine, in which she called China "a place where there are lies everywhere". In response to the controversy, Nomadland was pulled from theatrical release by Disney China, and the 93rd Academy Awards were censored by Chinese media outlets along with all mention of Zhao or the film on social media.

== Accolades ==
Nomadland won the Golden Lion at the Venice Film Festival and the People's Choice Award at the Toronto International Film Festival. It received four nominations at the 78th Golden Globe Awards, winning Best Motion Picture – Drama and Best Director; in winning the latter award, Zhao became the second woman and the first East Asian woman to do so. It received five nominations at the 36th Independent Spirit Awards and six at the 26th Critics' Choice Awards, winning four awards, including Best Picture, Best Director, and Best Adapted Screenplay. At the 27th Screen Actors Guild Awards, McDormand was nominated for Outstanding Performance by a Female Actor in a Leading Role. The film won the BAFTA Award for Best Film in 2021. It received six nominations at the 93rd Academy Awards, winning Best Director (with Zhao becoming the second woman and first nonwhite woman to do so), Best Picture, and Best Actress. Both the National Board of Review and the American Film Institute named Nomadland one of the top 10 films of 2020. In 2021, members of Writers Guild of America West (WGAW) and Writers Guild of America, East (WGAE) voted the film's screenplay 97th in WGA's 101 Greatest Screenplays of the 21st Century (so far).
