= List of accolades received by Minari =

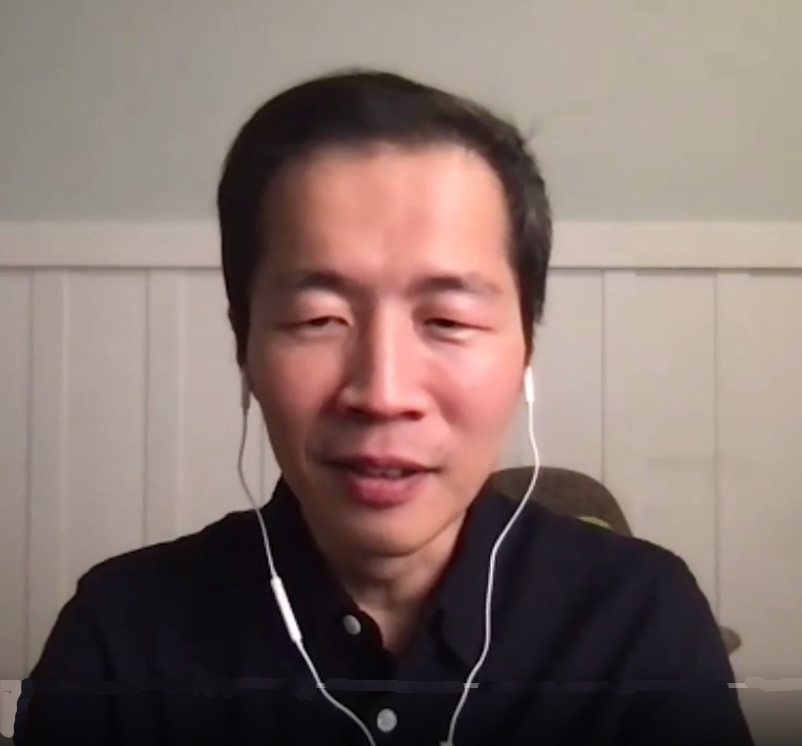
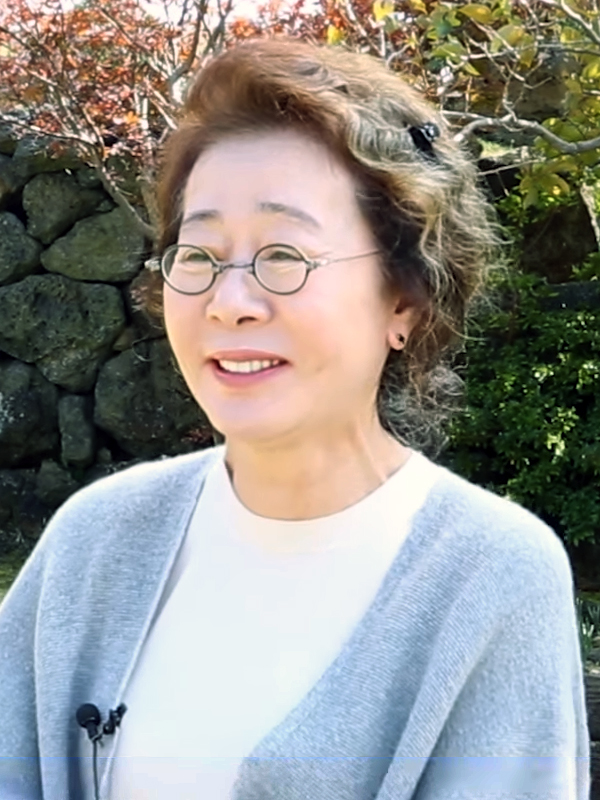
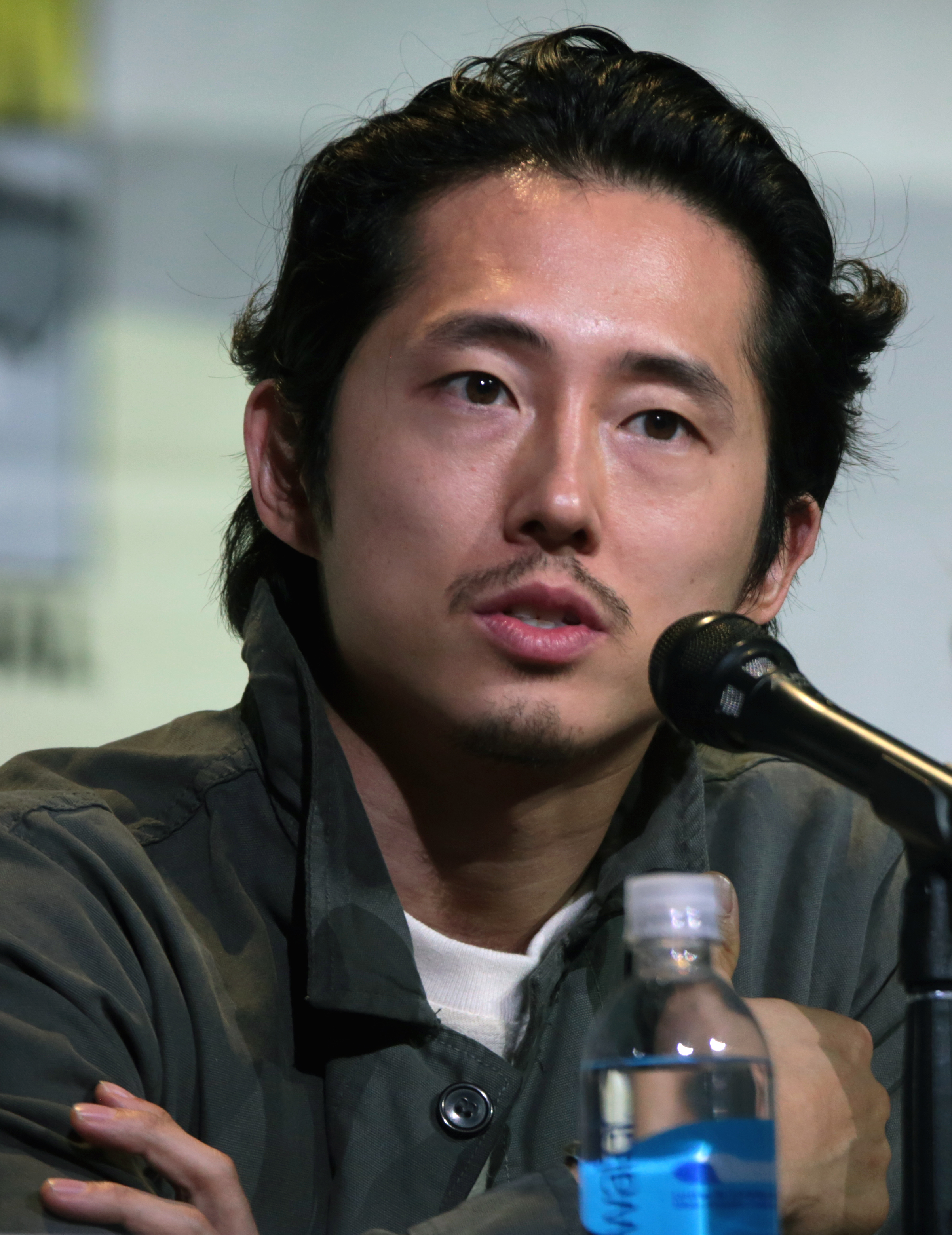
- Lee Isaac Chung (left) received praise for his direction and screenplay, and Youn Yuh-jung (middle) and Steven Yeun (right) were praised for their performances
Awards and nominations
Award	Wins	Nominations
Academy Awards	1	6
Alliance of Women Film Journalists	1	2
American Cinema Editors Awards	0	1
American Film Institute	1	1
Austin Film Critics Association	7	11
Australian Academy of Cinema and Television Arts	0	1
British Academy Film Awards	1	6
Boston Society of Film Critics	3	3
Casting Society of America	1	1
Chicago Film Critics Association	0	3
Critics' Choice Movie Awards	2	10
Deauville Film Festival	0	1
Denver Film Festival	2	2
Detroit Film Critics Society	3	3
Directors Guild of America Awards	0	1
Florida Film Critics Circle	4	6
Golden Globe Awards	1	1
Gotham Awards	0	1
Hollywood Critics Association Awards	2	6
Hollywood Music in Media Awards	1	2
Independent Spirit Awards	1	6
Los Angeles Film Critics Association	1	1
NAACP Image Awards	0	1
National Board of Review	3	3
New York Film Critics Online	3	6
Online Film Critics Society	1	6
Producers Guild of America	0	1
San Diego Film Critics Society Awards	2	3
San Francisco Bay Area Film Critics Circle	2	6
Satellite Awards	0	7
Screen Actors Guild Awards	1	3
Seattle Film Critics Society	3	8
Sundance Film Festival	2	2
Toronto Film Critics Association Awards	1	4
Vancouver Film Critics Circle	2	2
Washington D.C. Area Film Critics Association	2	8

Totals (Note: Certain award groups do not simply award one winner. They acknowledge several different recipients, have runners-up, and have third place. Since this is a specific recognition and is different from losing an award, runner-up mentions are considered wins in this award tally. For simplification and to avoid errors, each award in this list has been presumed to have had a prior nomination.)
- Wins: 54
- Nominations: 138

Minari (2020) is an American comedy-drama film written and directed by Lee Isaac Chung. The film stars Steven Yeun, Han Ye-ri, Alan Kim, Noel Kate Cho, Youn Yuh-jung and Will Patton. A semi-autobiographical take on Chung's upbringing, the plot follows a family of South Korean immigrants who try to make it in rural America during the 1980s.

The film premiered at the 2020 Sundance Film Festival where it received the U.S. Dramatic Grand Jury Prize and the U.S. Dramatic Audience Award. It was named one of the ten best films of 2020 by the American Film Institute and the National Board of Review. It also received 3 Screen Actors Guild Award nominations and 10 Critics' Choice Movie Awards nominations.

== Accolades ==
Award	Date of ceremony	Category	Recipient(s)	Result	Ref.
Academy Awards	April 25, 2021	Best Picture	Christina Oh	Nominated	
Academy Awards	April 25, 2021	Best Director	Lee Isaac Chung	Nominated	
Academy Awards	April 25, 2021	Best Actor	Steven Yeun	Nominated	
Academy Awards	April 25, 2021	Best Supporting Actress	Youn Yuh-jung	Won	
Academy Awards	April 25, 2021	Best Original Screenplay	Lee Isaac Chung	Nominated	
Academy Awards	April 25, 2021	Best Original Score	Emile Mosseri	Nominated	
Alliance of Women Film Journalists	January 4, 2021	Best Film	Minari	Nominated	
Alliance of Women Film Journalists	January 4, 2021	Best Supporting Actress	Youn Yuh-jung	Won	
American Cinema Editors Awards	April 17, 2021	Best Edited Feature Film – Dramatic	Harry Yoon	Nominated	
American Film Institute	January 25, 2021	Top 10 Movies of the Year	Minari	Won	
Austin Film Critics Association	March 19, 2021	Best Film	Minari	Won	
Austin Film Critics Association	March 19, 2021	Best Director	Lee Isaac Chung	Won	
Austin Film Critics Association	March 19, 2021	Best Actor	Steven Yeun	Nominated	
Austin Film Critics Association	March 19, 2021	Best Supporting Actress	Youn Yuh-jung	Won	
Austin Film Critics Association	March 19, 2021	Best Original Screenplay	Lee Isaac Chung	Won	
Austin Film Critics Association	March 19, 2021	Best Cinematography	Lachlan Milne	Nominated	
Austin Film Critics Association	March 19, 2021	Best Original Score	Emile Mosseri	Won	
Austin Film Critics Association	March 19, 2021	Best Foreign Language Film	Minari	Won	
Austin Film Critics Association	March 19, 2021	Best Ensemble	The cast of Minari	Won	
Austin Film Critics Association	March 19, 2021	The Robert R. “Bobby” McCurdy Memorial Breakthrough Artist Award	Alan Kim	Nominated	
Austin Film Critics Association	March 19, 2021	The Robert R. “Bobby” McCurdy Memorial Breakthrough Artist Award	Lee Isaac Chung	Nominated	
Australian Academy of Cinema and Television Arts	March 6, 2021	Best International Film	Minari	Nominated	
British Academy Film Awards	April 11, 2021	Best Film Not in the English Language	Lee Isaac Chung and Christina Oh	Nominated	
British Academy Film Awards	April 11, 2021	Best Director	Lee Isaac Chung	Nominated	
British Academy Film Awards	April 11, 2021	Best Supporting Actor	Alan Kim	Nominated	
British Academy Film Awards	April 11, 2021	Best Supporting Actress	Youn Yuh-jung	Won	
British Academy Film Awards	April 11, 2021	Best Original Music	Emile Mosseri	Nominated	
British Academy Film Awards	April 11, 2021	Best Casting	Julia Kim	Nominated	
Boston Society of Film Critics	December 13, 2020	Best Supporting Actress	Youn Yuh-jung	Won	
Boston Society of Film Critics	December 13, 2020	Best Original Score	Emile Mosseri	Won	
Boston Society of Film Critics	December 13, 2020	Best Ensemble	The cast of Minari	Runner-up	
Casting Society of America	April 15, 2021	Low Budget – Comedy or Drama	Julia Kim and Chris Freihofer	Won	
Chicago Film Critics Association	December 21, 2020	Best Actor	Steven Yeun	Nominated	
Chicago Film Critics Association	December 21, 2020	Best Supporting Actress	Youn Yuh-jung	Nominated	
Chicago Film Critics Association	December 21, 2020	Milos Stehlik Award for Promising Filmmaker	Lee Isaac Chung	Nominated	
Critics' Choice Awards	March 7, 2021	Best Picture	Minari	Nominated	
Critics' Choice Awards	March 7, 2021	Best Director	Lee Isaac Chung	Nominated	
Critics' Choice Awards	March 7, 2021	Best Actor	Steven Yeun	Nominated	
Critics' Choice Awards	March 7, 2021	Best Supporting Actress	Youn Yuh-jung	Nominated	
Critics' Choice Awards	March 7, 2021	Best Young Performer	Alan Kim	Won	
Critics' Choice Awards	March 7, 2021	Best Acting Ensemble	The ensemble of Minari	Nominated	
Critics' Choice Awards	March 7, 2021	Best Original Screenplay	Lee Isaac Chung	Nominated	
Critics' Choice Awards	March 7, 2021	Best Cinematography	Lachlan Milne	Nominated	
Critics' Choice Awards	March 7, 2021	Best Score	Emile Mosseri	Nominated	
Critics' Choice Awards	March 7, 2021	Best Foreign Language Film	Minari	Won	
Deauville Film Festival	September 9, 2020	Grand Special Prize	Lee Isaac Chung	Nominated	
Denver Film Festival	November 24, 2020	Audience Award for Narrative Feature	Minari	Won	
Denver Film Festival	November 24, 2020	Excellence in Acting Award	Steven Yeun	Won	
Detroit Film Critics Society	March 8, 2021	Best Picture	Minari	Nominated	
Detroit Film Critics Society	March 8, 2021	Best Director	Lee Isaac Chung	Nominated	
Detroit Film Critics Society	March 8, 2021	Best Actor	Steven Yeun	Nominated	
Detroit Film Critics Society	March 8, 2021	Best Supporting Actress	Youn Yuh-jung	Won	
Detroit Film Critics Society	March 8, 2021	Best Ensemble	The cast of Minari	Won	
Detroit Film Critics Society	March 8, 2021	Best Original Screenplay	Lee Isaac Chung	Won	
Directors Guild of America Award	April 10, 2021	Outstanding Directing – Feature Film	Lee Isaac Chung	Nominated	
Florida Film Critics Circle	December 21, 2020	Best Film	Minari	Runner-up	
Florida Film Critics Circle	December 21, 2020	Best Director	Lee Isaac Chung	Nominated	
Florida Film Critics Circle	December 21, 2020	Best Supporting Actress	Youn Yuh-jung	Runner-up	
Florida Film Critics Circle	December 21, 2020	Best Screenplay	Lee Isaac Chung	Won	
Florida Film Critics Circle	December 21, 2020	Best Ensemble	The cast of Minari	Nominated	
Florida Film Critics Circle	December 21, 2020	Best Foreign Language Film	Minari	Runner-up	
Golden Globe Awards	February 28, 2021	Best Foreign Language Film	Minari	Won	
Gotham Independent Film Awards	January 11, 2021	Best Actress	Youn Yuh-jung	Nominated	
Hollywood Critics Association Awards	March 5, 2021	Best Picture	Minari	Nominated	
Hollywood Critics Association Awards	March 5, 2021	Best Supporting Actress	Youn Yuh-jung	Won	
Hollywood Critics Association Awards	March 5, 2021	Best Male Director	Lee Isaac Chung	Nominated	
Hollywood Critics Association Awards	March 5, 2021	Best Original Screenplay	Lee Isaac Chung	Nominated	
Hollywood Critics Association Awards	March 5, 2021	Best Indie Film	Minari	Won	
Hollywood Critics Association Awards	March 5, 2021	Best Score	Emile Mosseri	Nominated	
Hollywood Music in Media Awards	January 27, 2021	Best Original Score in an Independent Film	Emile Mosseri	Won	
Hollywood Music in Media Awards	January 27, 2021	Best Original Song in an Independent Film	"Rain Song" – Emile Mosseri and Stefanie Hong	Nominated	
Independent Spirit Awards	April 22, 2021	Best Feature	Dede Gardner, Jeremy Kleiner and Christina Oh	Nominated	
Independent Spirit Awards	April 22, 2021	Best Director	Lee Isaac Chung	Nominated	
Independent Spirit Awards	April 22, 2021	Best Male Lead	Steven Yeun	Nominated	
Independent Spirit Awards	April 22, 2021	Best Supporting Female	Han Ye-ri	Nominated	
Independent Spirit Awards	April 22, 2021	Best Supporting Female	Youn Yuh-jung	Won	
Independent Spirit Awards	April 22, 2021	Best Screenplay	Lee Isaac Chung	Nominated	
Los Angeles Film Critics Association	December 20, 2020	Best Supporting Actress	Youn Yuh-jung	Won	
NAACP Image Awards	March 27, 2021	Outstanding Writing in a Motion Picture	Lee Isaac Chung	Nominated	
National Board of Review	January 26, 2021	Best Supporting Actress	Youn Yuh-jung	Won	
National Board of Review	January 26, 2021	Best Original Screenplay	Lee Isaac Chung	Won	
National Board of Review	January 26, 2021	Top 10 Films of 2020	Minari	Won	
New York Film Critics Online	January 26, 2021	Best Picture	Minari	Won	
New York Film Critics Online	January 26, 2021	Best Foreign Language Film	Minari	Won	
New York Film Critics Online	January 26, 2021	Best Supporting Actress	Youn Yuh-jung	Won	
New York Film Critics Online	January 26, 2021	Best Lead Actor	Steven Yeun	Nominated	
New York Film Critics Online	January 26, 2021	Best Lead Actress	Han Ye-ri	Nominated	
New York Film Critics Online	January 26, 2021	Best Director	Lee Isaac Chung	Nominated	
Online Film Critics Society	January 25, 2021	Best Picture	Minari	Nominated	
Online Film Critics Society	January 25, 2021	Best Actor	Steven Yeun	Nominated	
Online Film Critics Society	January 25, 2021	Best Supporting Actress	Youn Yuh-jung	Nominated	
Online Film Critics Society	January 25, 2021	Best Film Not in the English Language	Minari	Won	
Online Film Critics Society	January 25, 2021	Best Original Screenplay	Lee Isaac Chung	Nominated	
Online Film Critics Society	January 25, 2021	Best Original Score	Emile Mosseri	Nominated	
Producers Guild of America	March 24, 2021	Best Theatrical Motion Picture	Dede Gardner, Jeremy Kleiner, and Christina Oh	Nominated	
San Diego Film Critics Society Award	January 11, 2021	Best Supporting Actress	Youn Yuh-jung	Won	
San Diego Film Critics Society Award	January 11, 2021	Best Original Screenplay	Lee Isaac Chung	Won	
San Diego Film Critics Society Award	January 11, 2021	Best Actor	Steven Yeun	Nominated	
San Francisco Bay Area Film Critics Circle Awards	January 18, 2021	Best Film	Minari	Nominated	
San Francisco Bay Area Film Critics Circle Awards	January 18, 2021	Best Director	Lee Isaac Chung	Nominated	
San Francisco Bay Area Film Critics Circle Awards	January 18, 2021	Best Actor	Steven Yeun	Nominated	
San Francisco Bay Area Film Critics Circle Awards	January 18, 2021	Best Original Score	Emile Mosseri	Nominated	
San Francisco Bay Area Film Critics Circle Awards	January 18, 2021	Best Supporting Actress	Youn Yuh-jung	Won	
San Francisco Bay Area Film Critics Circle Awards	January 18, 2021	Best Original Screenplay	Lee Isaac Chung	Won	
Satellite Awards	February 15, 2021	Best Film - Drama	Minari	Nominated	
Satellite Awards	February 15, 2021	Best Director	Lee Isaac Chung	Nominated	
Satellite Awards	February 15, 2021	Best Actor	Steven Yeun	Nominated	
Satellite Awards	February 15, 2021	Best Supporting Actress	Youn Yuh-jung	Nominated	
Satellite Awards	February 15, 2021	Best Original Screenplay	Lee Isaac Chung	Nominated	
Satellite Awards	February 15, 2021	Best Editing	Harry Yoon	Nominated	
Satellite Awards	February 15, 2021	Best Original Score	Emile Mosseri	Nominated	
Screen Actors Guild Awards	April 4, 2021	Outstanding Cast in a Motion Picture	Noel Kate Cho, Han Ye-ri, Scott Haze, Alan Kim, Will Patton, Steven Yeun, Youn Yuh-jung	Nominated	
Screen Actors Guild Awards	April 4, 2021	Outstanding Actor in a Leading Role in a Motion Picture	Steven Yeun	Nominated	
Screen Actors Guild Awards	April 4, 2021	Outstanding Actress in a Supporting Role in a Motion Picture	Youn Yuh-Jung	Won	
Seattle Film Critics Society	February 15, 2021	Best Picture	Minari	Nominated	
Seattle Film Critics Society	February 15, 2021	Best Director	Lee Isaac Chung	Nominated	
Seattle Film Critics Society	February 15, 2021	Best Actor	Steven Yeun	Nominated	
Seattle Film Critics Society	February 15, 2021	Best Supporting Actress	Youn Yuh-jung	Won	
Seattle Film Critics Society	February 15, 2021	Best Ensemble Cast	Julia Kim	Nominated	
Seattle Film Critics Society	February 15, 2021	Best Foreign Language Film	Minari	Won	
Seattle Film Critics Society	February 15, 2021	Best Original Score	Emile Mosseri	Nominated	
Seattle Film Critics Society	February 15, 2021	Best Youth Performance	Alan Kim	Won	
Sundance Film Festival	February 1, 2020	U.S. Dramatic Competition Grand Jury Prize	Lee Isaac Chung	Won	
Sundance Film Festival	February 1, 2020	U.S. Dramatic Competition Audience Award	Lee Isaac Chung	Won	
Toronto Film Critics Association Awards	February 7, 2021	Best Film	Minari	Nominated	
Toronto Film Critics Association Awards	February 7, 2021	Best Supporting Actress	Youn Yuh-jung	Nominated	
Toronto Film Critics Association Awards	February 7, 2021	Best Director	Lee Isaac Chung	Nominated	
Toronto Film Critics Association Awards	February 7, 2021	Best Screenplay	Lee Isaac Chung	Won	
Vancouver Film Critics Circle	February 22, 2021	Best Supporting Actress	Youn Yuh-jung	Won	
Vancouver Film Critics Circle	February 22, 2021	Best Foreign Language Film	Minari	Won	
Washington D.C. Area Film Critics Association	February 8, 2021	Best Film	Minari	Nominated	
Washington D.C. Area Film Critics Association	February 8, 2021	Best Director	Lee Isaac Chung	Nominated	
Washington D.C. Area Film Critics Association	February 8, 2021	Best Actor	Steven Yeun	Nominated	
Washington D.C. Area Film Critics Association	February 8, 2021	Best Supporting Actress	Youn Yuh-jung	Won	
Washington D.C. Area Film Critics Association	February 8, 2021	Best Youth Performance	Alan Kim	Won	
Washington D.C. Area Film Critics Association	February 8, 2021	Best Original Screenplay	Lee Isaac Chung	Nominated	
Washington D.C. Area Film Critics Association	February 8, 2021	Best Original Score	Emile Mosseri	Nominated	
Washington D.C. Area Film Critics Association	February 8, 2021	Best Ensemble	Minari	Nominated	

== See also ==
- 2020 in film
