= List of accolades received by Promising Young Woman =

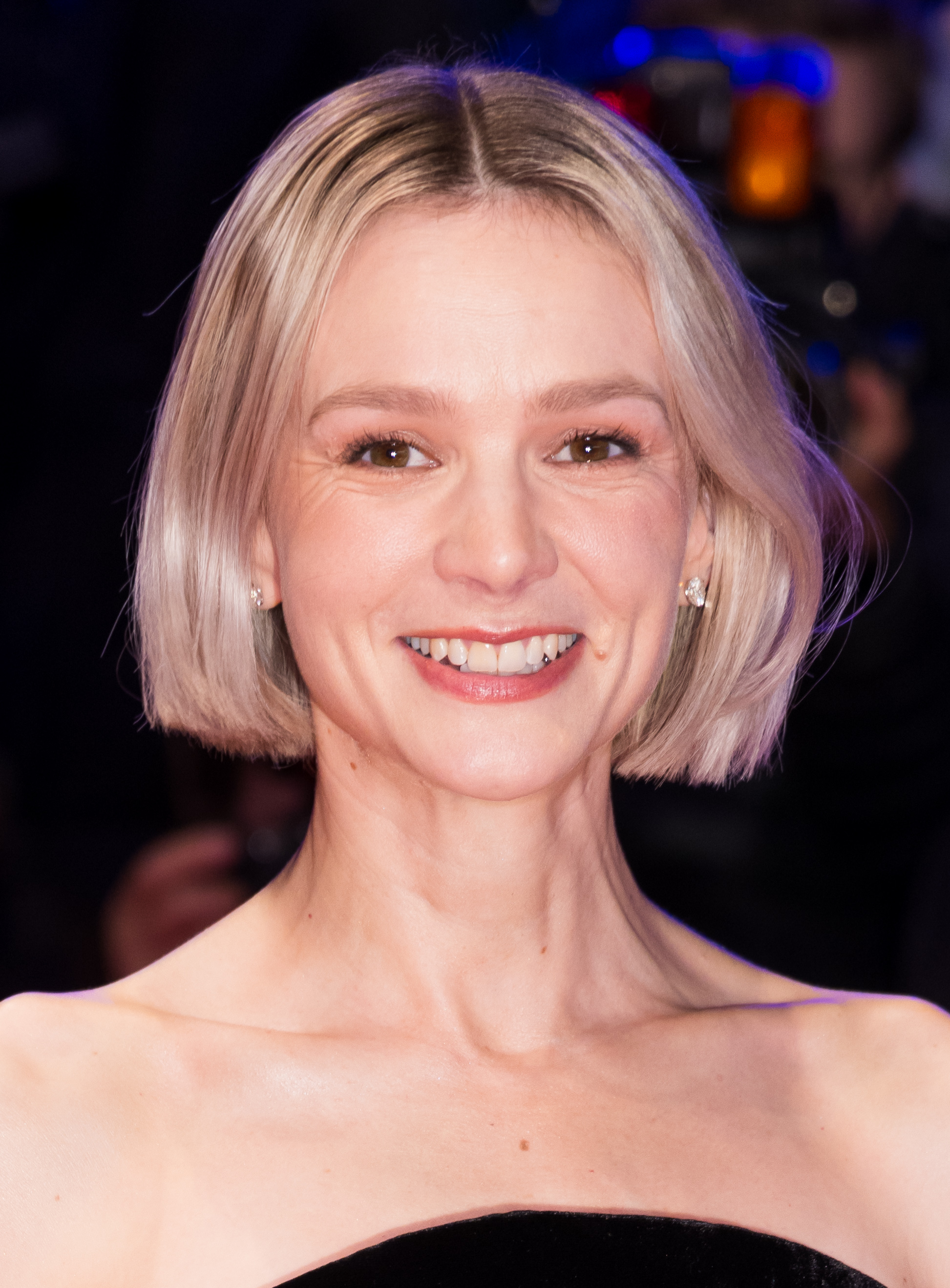
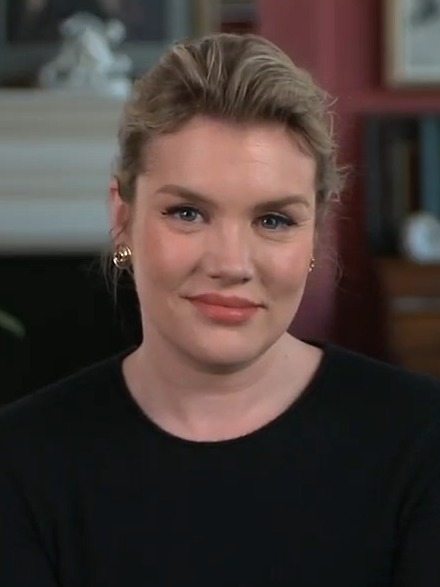
- Carey Mulligan's performance and Emerald Fennell's screenplay and direction received the most accolades from various ceremonies.
Awards and nominations
Award	Wins	Nominations
Academy Awards	1	5
AACTA Awards	2	4
American Cinema Editors Awards	0	1
Art Directors Guild Awards	0	1
Austin Film Critics Association	2	5
British Academy Film Awards	2	6
Casting Society of America	0	1
Chicago Film Critics Association	1	5
Costume Designers Guild Awards	1	1
Critics' Choice Movie Awards	2	6
Directors Guild of America Awards	0	1
Dorian Awards	2	4
Florida Film Critics Circle	2	3
Golden Globe Awards	0	4
Hollywood Critics Association	5	10
Hollywood Music in Media Awards	1	2
Independent Spirit Awards	2	3
London Film Critics' Circle	0	4
Los Angeles Film Critics Association	2	2
Make-Up Artists and Hair Stylists Guild Awards	0	2
MTV Movie & TV Awards	0	2
National Board of Review	1	1
Palm Springs International Film Festival	1	1
Producers Guild of America Awards	0	1
Santa Barbara International Film Festival	1	1
Screen Actors Guild Awards	0	1
Seattle Film Critics Society	1	4
Set Decorators Society of America Awards	1	1
Toronto Film Critics Association	0	1
Washington D.C. Area Film Critics Association	1	4
Writers Guild of America Awards	1	1
Goya Awards	0	1

Totals (Note: Certain award groups do not simply award one winner. They acknowledge several different recipients, have runners-up, and have third place. Since this is a specific recognition and is different from losing an award, runner-up mentions are considered wins in this award tally. For simplification and to avoid errors, each award in this list has been presumed to have had a prior nomination.)
- Wins: 33
- Nominations: 89

Promising Young Woman is a 2020 American black comedy tragedy thriller film written, co-produced, and directed by Emerald Fennell in her feature directorial debut, featuring Carey Mulligan in the lead role, alongside Bo Burnham, Alison Brie, Clancy Brown, Jennifer Coolidge, Laverne Cox, and Connie Britton in supporting roles. It is produced by Margot Robbie's production company LuckyChap Entertainment and FilmNation Entertainment.

The film follows Cassie (Mulligan), a young unstable woman haunted by a traumatic past as she navigates balancing forgiveness and vengeance. It had its world premiere at the Sundance Film Festival on January 25, 2020, and was theatrically released in the United States on December 25, 2020, by Focus Features. It received positive reviews from critics, with praise for its screenplay, direction, and Mulligan's performance, and grossed $17 million worldwide.

Promising Young Woman received five nominations at the 93rd Academy Awards and won Best Original Screenplay. At the 74th British Academy Film Awards, the film won two out of its six nominations — Best Original Screenplay and Outstanding British Film. It further received nominations for four Golden Globes, six Critics' Choice Movie Awards (winning Best Actress for Mulligan and Best Original Screenplay), one Screen Actors Guild Awards, four AACTA Awards (winning Best International Film and Best International Actress for Mulligan), amongst several others. The wins at most of the ceremonies were for either Mulligan's performance or Fennell's screenplay and direction.

== Accolades ==
Award	Date of ceremony	Category	Recipient(s)	Result	Ref.
Academy Awards	April 25, 2021	Best Picture	Ben Browning, Ashley Fox, Emerald Fennell, and Josey McNamara	Nominated	
Academy Awards	April 25, 2021	Best Director	Emerald Fennell	Nominated	
Academy Awards	April 25, 2021	Best Actress	Carey Mulligan	Nominated	
Academy Awards	April 25, 2021	Best Original Screenplay	Emerald Fennell	Won	
Academy Awards	April 25, 2021	Best Film Editing	Frédéric Thoraval	Nominated	
AACTA Awards	March 6, 2021	Best International Film		Won	
AACTA Awards	March 6, 2021	Best International Direction	Emerald Fennell	Nominated	
AACTA Awards	March 6, 2021	Best International Screenplay	Emerald Fennell	Nominated	
AACTA Awards	March 6, 2021	Best International Actress	Carey Mulligan	Won	
American Cinema Editors Awards	April 17, 2021	Best Edited Feature Film – Comedy	Frédéric Thoraval	Nominated	
Art Directors Guild Awards	April 10, 2021	Excellence in Production Design for a Contemporary Film	Michael T. Perry	Nominated	
Austin Film Critics Association	March 19, 2021	Best Film		Nominated	
Austin Film Critics Association	March 19, 2021	Best Director	Emerald Fennell	Nominated	
Austin Film Critics Association	March 19, 2021	Best Original Screenplay	Emerald Fennell	Nominated	
Austin Film Critics Association	March 19, 2021	Best Actress	Carey Mulligan	Won	
Austin Film Critics Association	March 19, 2021	Best First Film		Won	
British Academy Film Awards	April 11, 2021	Best Film	Ben Browning, Emerald Fennell, Ashley Fox, and Josey McNamara	Nominated	
British Academy Film Awards	April 11, 2021	Best Original Screenplay	Emerald Fennell	Won	
British Academy Film Awards	April 11, 2021	Best Casting	Mary Vernieu and Lindsay Graham Ahanonu	Nominated	
British Academy Film Awards	April 11, 2021	Best Editing	Frédéric Thoraval	Nominated	
British Academy Film Awards	April 11, 2021	Best Original Music	Anthony Willis	Nominated	
British Academy Film Awards	April 11, 2021	Outstanding British Film	Emerald Fennell, Ben Browning, Ashley Fox, and Josey McNamara	Won	
Casting Society of America	April 15, 2021	Feature Studio Or Independent – Drama	Mary Vernieu and Lindsay Graham Ahanonu	Nominated	
Chicago Film Critics Association	December 21, 2020	Best Picture		Nominated	
Chicago Film Critics Association	December 21, 2020	Best Director	Emerald Fennell	Nominated	
Chicago Film Critics Association	December 21, 2020	Best Original Screenplay	Emerald Fennell	Nominated	
Chicago Film Critics Association	December 21, 2020	Best Actress	Carey Mulligan	Nominated	
Chicago Film Critics Association	December 21, 2020	Milos Stehlik Award for Promising Filmmaker	Emerald Fennell	Won	
Costume Designers Guild Awards	April 13, 2021	Excellence in Contemporary Film	Nancy Steiner	Won	
Critics' Choice Movie Awards	March 7, 2021	Best Picture		Nominated	
Critics' Choice Movie Awards	March 7, 2021	Best Director	Emerald Fennell	Nominated	
Critics' Choice Movie Awards	March 7, 2021	Best Original Screenplay	Emerald Fennell	Won	
Critics' Choice Movie Awards	March 7, 2021	Best Actress	Carey Mulligan	Won	
Critics' Choice Movie Awards	March 7, 2021	Best Costume Design	Nancy Steiner	Nominated	
Critics' Choice Movie Awards	March 7, 2021	Best Makeup		Nominated	
Directors Guild of America Awards	April 10, 2021	Outstanding Directing – Feature Film	Emerald Fennell	Nominated	
Dorian Awards	April 18, 2021	Best Film		Nominated	
Dorian Awards	April 18, 2021	Best Director	Emerald Fennell	Nominated	
Dorian Awards	April 18, 2021	Best Screenplay (Original or Adapted)	Emerald Fennell	Won	
Dorian Awards	April 18, 2021	Best Film Performance – Actress	Carey Mulligan	Won	
Florida Film Critics Circle	December 21, 2020	Best Actress	Carey Mulligan	Runner-up	
Florida Film Critics Circle	December 21, 2020	Best Original Screenplay	Emerald Fennell	Nominated	
Florida Film Critics Circle	December 21, 2020	Best First Film	Emerald Fennell	Won	
Golden Globe Awards	February 28, 2021	Best Motion Picture – Drama		Nominated	
Golden Globe Awards	February 28, 2021	Best Actress – Motion Picture Drama	Carey Mulligan	Nominated	
Golden Globe Awards	February 28, 2021	Best Director	Emerald Fennell	Nominated	
Golden Globe Awards	February 28, 2021	Best Screenplay	Emerald Fennell	Nominated	
Hollywood Critics Association	March 5, 2021	Best Picture		Won	
Hollywood Critics Association	March 5, 2021	Best Female Director	Emerald Fennell	Nominated	
Hollywood Critics Association	March 5, 2021	Best Actress	Carey Mulligan	Won	
Hollywood Critics Association	March 5, 2021	Best Supporting Actor	Bo Burnham	Nominated	
Hollywood Critics Association	March 5, 2021	Best Original Screenplay	Emerald Fennell	Won	
Hollywood Critics Association	March 5, 2021	Best Editing	Frédéric Thoraval	Nominated	
Hollywood Critics Association	March 5, 2021	Best Hair & Makeup	Promising Young Woman	Nominated	
Hollywood Critics Association	March 5, 2021	Best Cast Ensemble	Promising Young Woman	Nominated	
Hollywood Critics Association	March 5, 2021	Best First Feature	Emerald Fennell	Won	
Hollywood Critics Association	March 5, 2021	Filmmaker On The Rise	Emerald Fennell	Won	
Hollywood Music in Media Awards	January 27, 2021	Best Music Supervision – Film		Nominated	
Hollywood Music in Media Awards	January 27, 2021	Best Soundtrack Album		Won	
Independent Spirit Awards	April 22, 2021	Best Director	Emerald Fennell	Nominated	
Independent Spirit Awards	April 22, 2021	Best Female Lead	Carey Mulligan	Won	
Independent Spirit Awards	April 22, 2021	Best Screenplay	Emerald Fennell	Won	
London Film Critics' Circle	February 7, 2021	Film of the Year		Nominated	
London Film Critics' Circle	February 7, 2021	Actress of the Year	Carey Mulligan	Nominated	
London Film Critics' Circle	February 7, 2021	British/Irish Actress of the Year	Carey Mulligan	Nominated	
London Film Critics' Circle	February 7, 2021	Breakthrough British/Irish Filmmaker of the Year	Emerald Fennell	Nominated	
Los Angeles Film Critics Association	December 20, 2020	Best Actress	Carey Mulligan	Won	
Los Angeles Film Critics Association	December 20, 2020	Best Screenplay	Emerald Fennell	Won	
Make-Up Artists and Hair Stylists Guild	April 3, 2021	Best Contemporary Make-Up in a Feature-Length Motion Picture	Angela Wells, Brigitte Hennech, and Adam Christopher	Nominated	
Make-Up Artists and Hair Stylists Guild	April 3, 2021	Best Contemporary Hair Styling in a Feature-Length Motion Picture	Daniel Curet, Bryson Conley, and Lee Ann Brittenham	Nominated	
MTV Movie & TV Awards	May 16, 2021	Best Movie		Nominated	
MTV Movie & TV Awards	May 16, 2021	Best Performance in a Movie	Carey Mulligan	Nominated	
National Board of Review	January 26, 2021	Best Actress	Carey Mulligan	Won	
Palm Springs International Film Festival	February 27, 2021	International Star Award	Carey Mulligan	Won	
Producers Guild of America Award	March 24, 2021	Best Theatrical Motion Picture	Josey McNamara, Ben Browning, Ashley Fox, and Emerald Fennell	Nominated	
Santa Barbara International Film Festival	April 8, 2021	Cinema Vanguard Award	Carey Mulligan	Won	
Screen Actors Guild Awards	April 4, 2021	Outstanding Performance by a Female Actor in a Leading Role	Carey Mulligan	Nominated	
Seattle Film Critics Society	February 15, 2021	Best Picture of the Year		Nominated	
Seattle Film Critics Society	February 15, 2021	Best Director	Emerald Fennell	Nominated	
Seattle Film Critics Society	February 15, 2021	Best Actress	Carey Mulligan	Nominated	
Seattle Film Critics Society	February 15, 2021	Best Screenplay	Emerald Fennell	Won	
Set Decorators Society of America Awards	March 31, 2021	Best Achievement in Décor/Design of a Contemporary Feature Film	Rae Deslich and Michael T. Perry	Won	
Toronto Film Critics Association	February 7, 2021	Best First Feature	Emerald Fennell	Nominated	
Washington D.C. Area Film Critics Association	February 8, 2021	Best Film		Nominated	
Washington D.C. Area Film Critics Association	February 8, 2021	Best Director	Emerald Fennell	Nominated	
Washington D.C. Area Film Critics Association	February 8, 2021	Best Actress	Carey Mulligan	Nominated	
Washington D.C. Area Film Critics Association	February 8, 2021	Best Original Screenplay	Emerald Fennell	Won	
Writers Guild of America Awards	March 21, 2021	Best Original Screenplay	Emerald Fennell	Won	
Goya Awards	February 12, 2022	Best European Film		Nominated	

== See also ==
- 2021 in film
- Promising Young Woman (score)
- Promising Young Woman (soundtrack)
