= Christina Oh =

American film producer

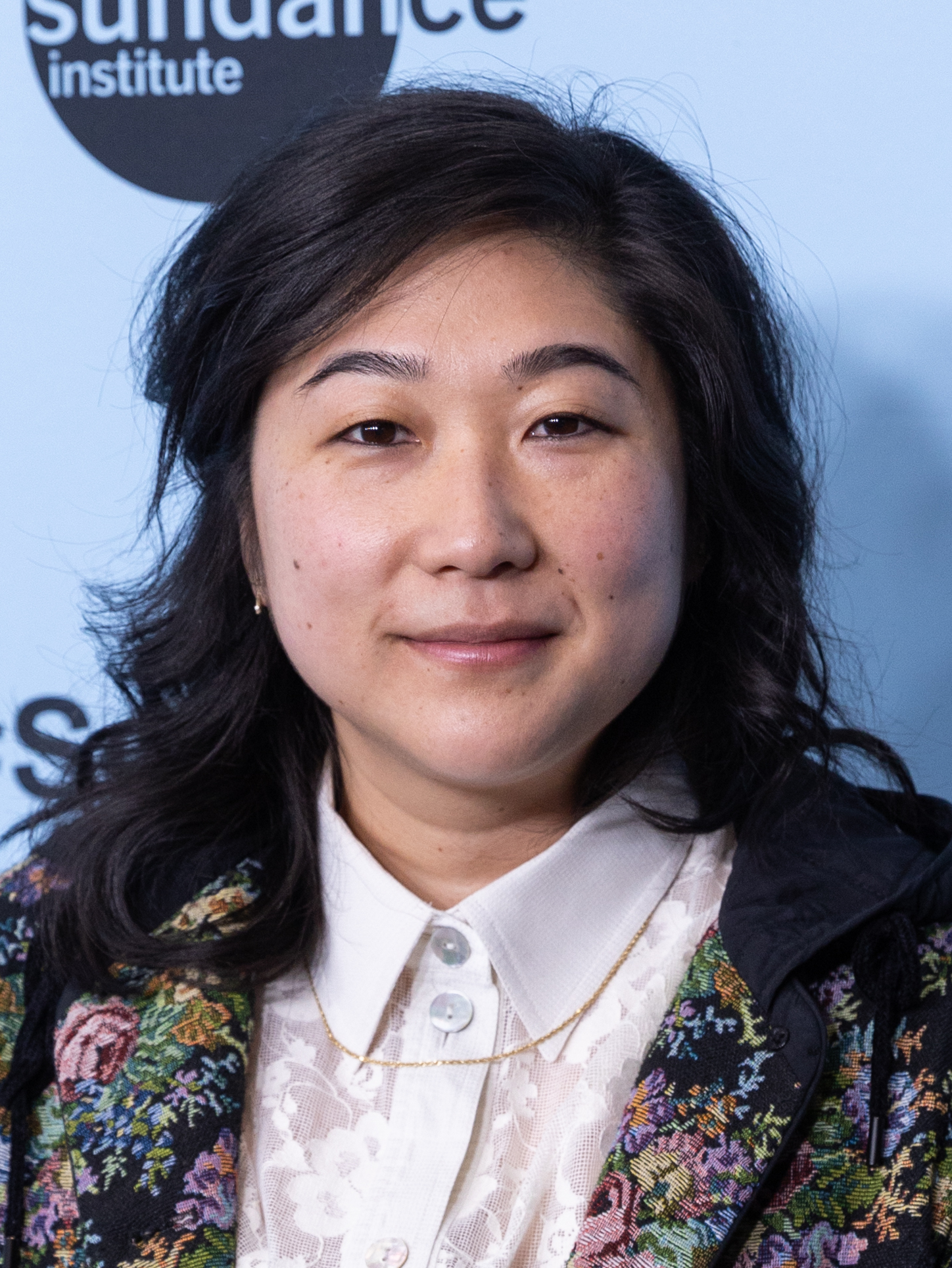
- Christina Oh in 2025
- Occupation: Film producer
- Years active: 2000-present

Christina Oh is an American film producer. She is best known for producing Minari, which earned 6 nominations at the 93rd Academy Awards. The film debuted at the Sundance Film Festival on January 26, 2020, winning both the U.S. Dramatic Grand Jury Prize and the U.S. Dramatic Audience Award.

Oh is of Korean descent. She started in the film business in the late 2000s in the casting field. In 2021, Annapurna Pictures named Oh as EVP, Co-Head of Film. She had previously been at Plan B Entertainment for a decade, where she produced Bong Joon-Ho's Okja, and Joe Talbot's The Last Black Man In San Francisco. She has also executive produced Lego Masters for FOX and Paper Girls for Legendary TV and Amazon.

== Accolades ==
Award	Date of ceremony	Category	Recipient(s)	Result	Ref.
Academy Awards	April 25, 2021	Best Picture	Christina Oh	Nominated	
Independent Spirit Awards	April 22, 2021	Best Feature	Dede Gardner, Jeremy Kleiner and Christina Oh	Nominated	

=== Honours ===
- Jury member at the 2023 Busan International Film Festival for its main competition section 'New Currents Award'.
