= Promising Young Woman (score) =

Promising Young Woman (Original Motion Picture Score)

Film score by Anthony Willis
- Released: December 11, 2020
- Recorded: 2019–2020
- Genre: Film score
- Length: 43:03
- Label: Back Lot Music
- Producer: Anthony Willis

Anthony Willis chronology
How to Train Your Dragon: Homecoming (2019)	Promising Young Woman (2020)	Hump (2022)

Promising Young Woman (Original Motion Picture Score) is the score album to the 2020 film Promising Young Woman, directed by Emerald Fennell, and featuring an original score composed by Anthony Willis. It was released on December 11, 2020, by Back Lot Music. The score consisted of incepts from classical thriller film scores, reminiscing of Alfred Hitchcock and Bernard Herrmann's compositions. The score was recorded at Synchron Stage in Vienna, and made use of conventional classic instruments, suiting with the film and its theme, and not being inspired or modified from the incorporated songs used in the soundtrack album. The score was positively received, and Willis was nominated for Best Original Music at the 74th BAFTA Awards.

== Production ==
The original score is composed by Fennell's high school classmate, Anthony Willis, who previously assisted as an executive producer to John Powell. Fennell said that she wanted a score that could be "old-fashioned", similar to Alfred Hitchcock and Bernard Herrmann's works. When she narrated the script to Willis, she told him that "the film was a dark comedic thriller with musical elements" and wanted him to write a thematic music, in contrary to the pop soundtracks curated for the film. He zeroed on the relationship between Cassie (Mulligan) and Nina Fisher, as his initial concept and created a optimistic lullaby which turned to be a dark and haunting theme about a lost relationship, inflicting the traumatic past of Cassie.

In an interview with Billboard, Willis said, "What struck me the most when I first watched it was how brilliantly [Mulligan] plays the role of this woman who's really in this kind of purgatory. She's stopped living her own life back in college ... and as I started writing the theme, what I realized was it wasn't really her theme; it was a theme for a lost friendship." Nina's separate theme, he wrote for the film, was considered to be "the most haunting, beautiful, and sad piece of music [...] which had roots in Cassie's theme, but it develops into a piece on its own that reveals the true heart of the film. Even after not meeting Nina at all."

As the pop tracks were already featured in the film, as an integral part of the narrative, Willis had originally planned for creating the sub-versions of the pop tracks and use it in the score. But Fennell decided against it, and wanted "the score very much needs to be its own thread which is a counterpart to the songs and achieve something the pop songs don't do". Hence, he created an original score consisted of classical thriller music from Herrmann's compositions, which Fennell liked and approved. About the tone of the soundtrack, Willis stated

"The tone of the film is so original. Within the same frame, you experience things that are shocking and yet entertain you, that make you laugh and reflect on your life. There is something really nimble about how the tone of the film changes. The best thing the score can do is to try not to jump around with those beats. In the film, the score stays sincere, even as the tone of the film changes from something playful and mischievous to becoming a love story to ending up a thriller."

The string palate, which was used in the score, consisted of classic thriller strings, and a sustained organ "having a very breath-like quality to it, much like a human voice". Fennell liked the organ, mostly because of "that voice quality and a tone of judgment and justice in it". Willis stated "We also had a female vocal pad throughout, which connected to the fact that all the pop songs were sung by women". He also contributed to the orchestral version of the Britney Spears' single "Toxic", he used a string quartet and slowed down the orchestration, the arrangement was done in such a way that the audience should "disconnect the song that you normally associate being really fun in a very unpleasant setting", and had added that "the texture of mangled stings with an orchestra tuning up is quite subtle but effective". He did not inspire any pop song to create melodies; however, cues from "Something Wonderful", from the 1951 musical The King and I, provided inspiration for Willis to create a melody.

== Track listing ==
No.	Title	Length
1.	"Hymn for Nina"	2:26
2.	"Al Monroe"	2:31
3.	"Madison"	3:19
4.	"Ryan"	2:06
5.	"Damsels & Good Guys"	1:53
6.	"The Dean at Good Forest"	3:04
7.	"A Legal Redemption"	3:14
8.	"Cassie"	1:48
9.	"Blue Halo"	2:22
10.	"Squeezed Out"	6:45
11.	"Missing Person's Report"	0:59
12.	"Thriller Suite"	8:59
13.	"Romance Suite"	3:32
Total length:		43:03

== Critical reception ==
Dennis Harvey of Variety said that Willis' score is "puzzlingly conventional and earnest, complete with ominous Dolby thumps every time justice is served". Sophie Kaufman of Empire said that the "tonal breadth plays out in the clash between a sugary pop soundtrack, versus Anthony B. Willis' original score: a low, groaning rumble punctuated with juddering drum-bams that never lets you forget the other plotline lurking beneath." Sight & Sound's Kate Stables reviewed, "Punchy but on-the-nose music choices accentuate this – a car-battering headily jacked up with Wagner's Liebestod, and Anthony Willis's score emitting ominous uh-oh thuds at tense moments." Peter Bradshaw of The Guardian, in his five-star review, called Willis' "ruthlessly effective musical score underlines both the horror and the sadness".

== Accolades ==
Willis, received nomination for BAFTA Award for Best Original Music at the 74th British Academy Film Awards. He was shortlisted for the initial nomination for Academy Award for Best Original Score and the Grammy Award for Best Score Soundtrack for Visual Media, but neither finalised in any category.
