= Alan Kim =

American child actor (born 2012)

- Born: Alan Sun Kim; April 23, 2012 (age 14); Chicago, Illinois, U.S.
- Occupation: Actor
- Years active: 2020–present
- Known for: Minari (2020); IF (2024)
- Awards: Critics' Choice Movie Award for Best Young Performer (2021)

Korean name
- Hangul: 김선
- Hanja: 金善
- RR: Gim Seon
- MR: Kim Sŏn

Alan Sun Kim (born April 23, 2012) is an American child actor, widely known for his critically acclaimed role in the drama film Minari (2020), for which he was nominated for a BAFTA Award for Best Actor in a Supporting Role.

== Early life ==
Kim was born in Chicago to South Korean parents but moved with them to Irvine, California. He spoke Korean as his first language and has a first degree black belt in taekwondo.

== Acting career ==
At age 7, Kim was cast as David Yi in the 2020 film Minari, for which he won the 2021 Critics' Choice Movie Award for Best Young Performer and was nominated for a BAFTA Award for Best Actor in a Supporting Role, becoming one of the category's youngest nominees. Before Minari, the only acting he had done was in an ad for Pottery Barn Kids.

In March 2021, it was announced that Kim would star in the second season of Awkwafina Is Nora from Queens as the young version of Wally, the father of title character Awkwafina.

In January 2022, Kim was cast in the film IF written and directed by John Krasinski.

== Filmography ==
Year	Title	Role	Notes
2020	Minari	David	
2023	Theater Camp	Alan Park	
2023	Paw Patrol: The Mighty Movie	Nano (voice)	
2024	IF	Benjamin	

Key
†	Denotes films that have not yet been released

=== Television ===
Year	Title	Role	Notes
2021	Awkwafina Is Nora from Queens	Young Wally	Episode: "Tales from the Blackout"
2022	Little America	Luke Song	Episode: "Mr. Song"
2023–2024	Mickey Mouse Funhouse	Kyung Won (voice)	3 episodes
2024	Monsters at Work	Ben (voice)	4 episodes

== Awards and nominations ==
Year	Award	Category	Work	Result	Ref
2020	Washington D.C. Area Film Critics Association Awards	Best Youth Performance	Minari	Won	
2020	Seattle Film Critics Society	Best Youth Performance	Minari	Won	
2020	Austin Film Critics Association	Breakthrough Artist Award	Minari	Nominated	
2021	Critics' Choice Movie Awards	Best Young Performer	Minari	Won	
2021	Screen Actors Guild Awards	Outstanding Performance by a Cast in a Motion Picture (shared)	Minari	Nominated	
2021	British Academy Film Awards	Best Actor in a Supporting Role	Minari	Nominated	
