= 27th Screen Actors Guild Awards =

- Description: Outstanding motion picture and primetime television performances
- Date: April 4, 2021
- Country: United States
- Presented by: SAG-AFTRA

Highlights
- Most awards: The Crown; Ma Rainey's Black Bottom; Schitt's Creek (2)
- Most nominations: The Crown; Schitt's Creek (5)
- Website: www.sagawards.org

Television/radio coverage
- Network: TNT and TBS simultaneous broadcast

The 27th Annual Screen Actors Guild Awards, honoring the best achievements in film and television performances for the year 2020, were presented on April 4, 2021. The ceremony was broadcast on both TNT and TBS at 9:00 P.M. EST / 6:00 P.M. PST, airing for one hour rather than the usual two. The nominees were announced by Lily Collins and Daveed Diggs on February 4, 2021 via Instagram Live.

Additionally, the shortened one-hour show was pre-recorded. The winners were informed of their wins a few days before the telecast and the acceptance speeches were also pre-taped. These changes were a COVID-era decision in order to protect the guild's nominees and presenters.

Michael Keaton made history by becoming the first person in SAG history to win three awards for Outstanding Performance by a Cast in a Motion Picture, winning this year for The Trial of the Chicago 7. In 2015 and 2016, he was part of the winning ensembles for Birdman (2014) and Spotlight (2015), respectively.

Chadwick Boseman tied Jamie Foxx and Maggie Smith in the record for most nominations in a single ceremony with four: Outstanding Performance by a Male Actor in a Leading Role for Ma Rainey's Black Bottom, Outstanding Performance by a Male Actor in a Supporting Role for Da 5 Bloods, and as part of the ensembles of both films for Outstanding Performance by a Cast in a Motion Picture. Boseman ultimately won for Outstanding Performance by a Male Actor in a Leading Role, making history as the first actor to win the category posthumously; his widow, Taylor Simone Ledward, accepted the award.

The ceremony also marked the first time that all four individual film acting categories were won by people of color.

== Winners and nominees ==
- Note: Winners are listed first and highlighted in **boldface**.

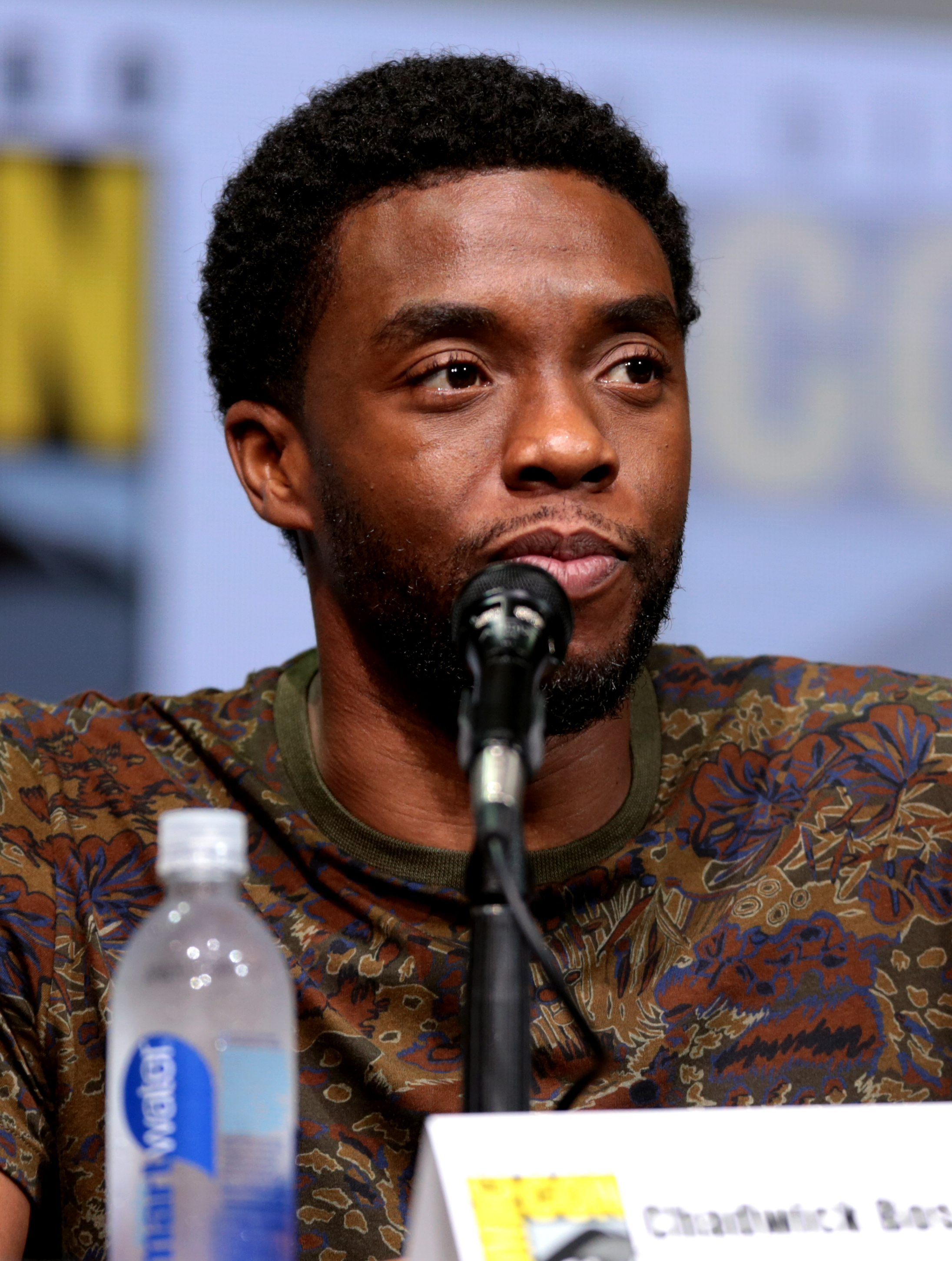
Chadwick Boseman, Outstanding Performance by a Male Actor in a Leading Role winner

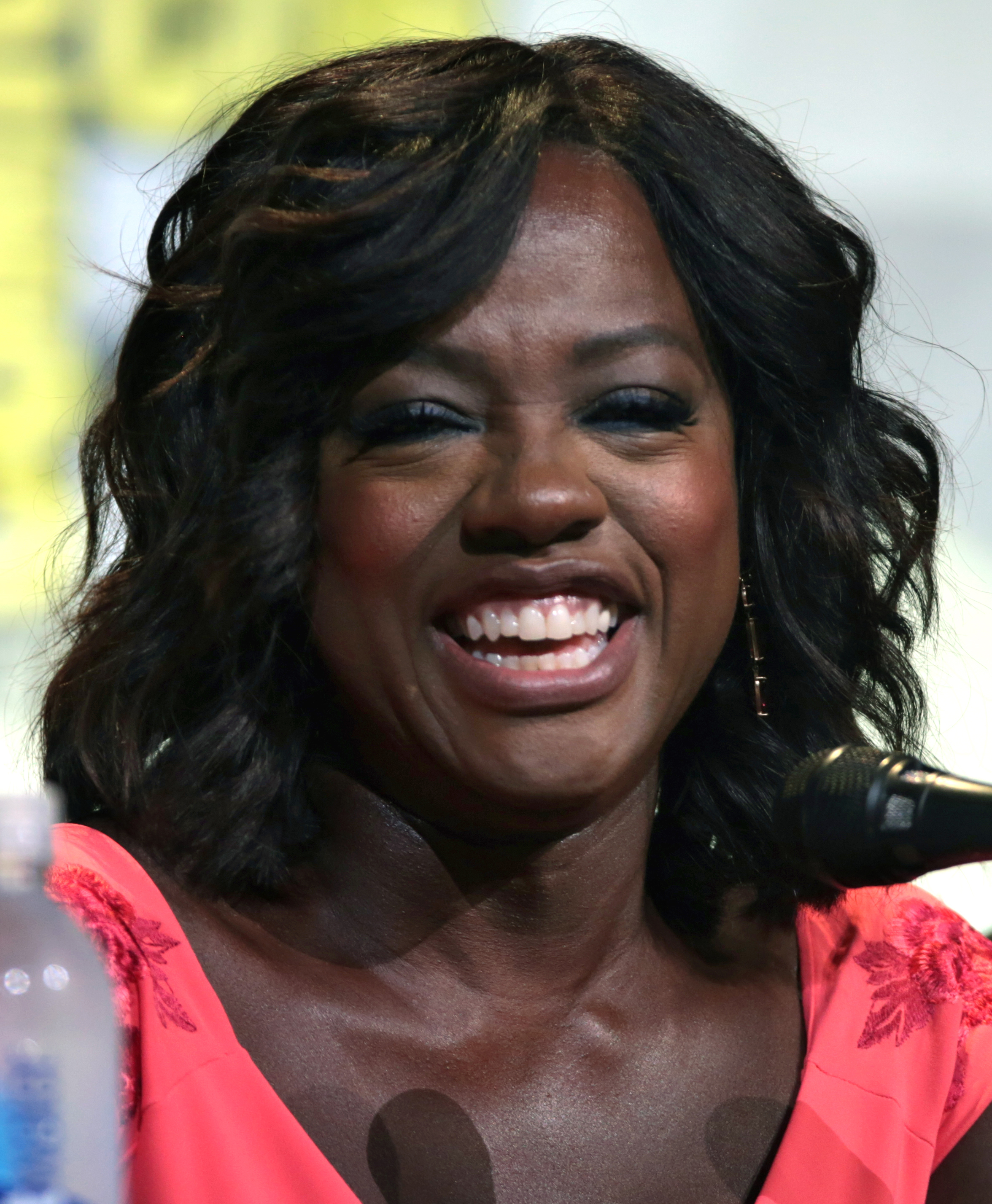
Viola Davis, Outstanding Performance by a Female Actor in a Leading Role winner

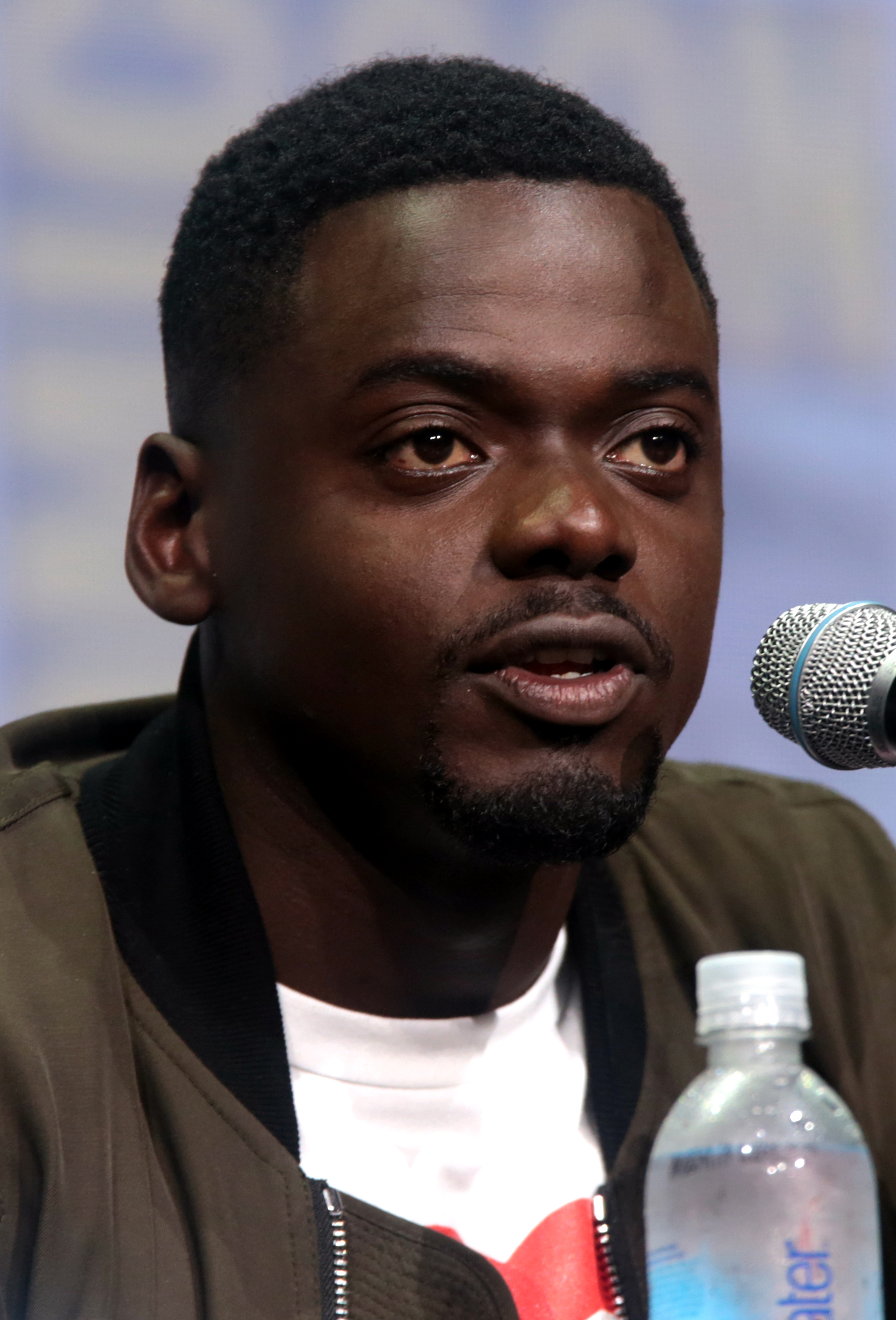
Daniel Kaluuya, Outstanding Performance by a Male Actor in a Supporting Role winner

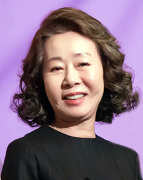
Youn Yuh-jung, Outstanding Performance by a Female Actor in a Supporting Role winner

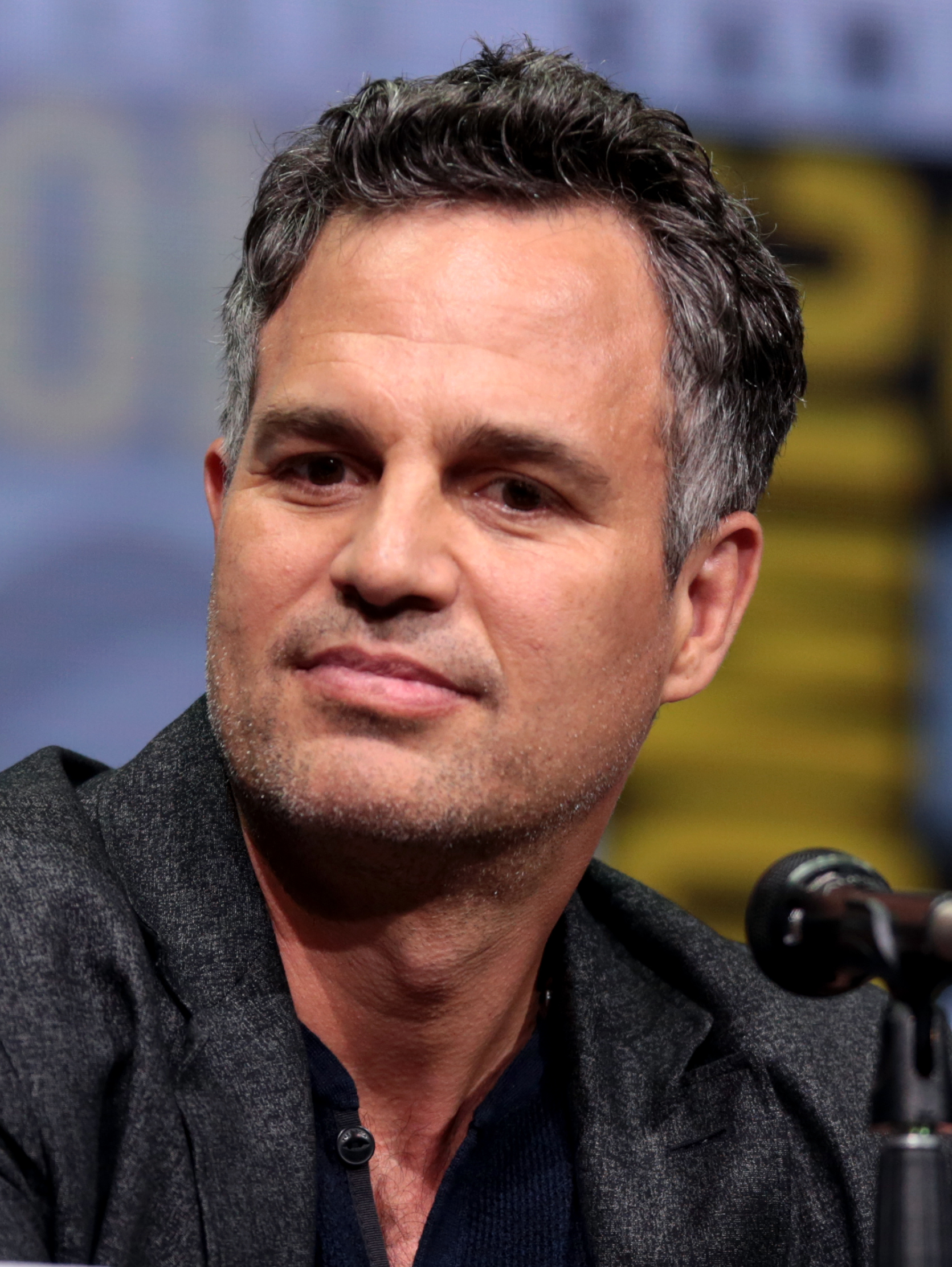
Mark Ruffalo, Outstanding Performance by a Male Actor in a Television Movie or Limited Series winner

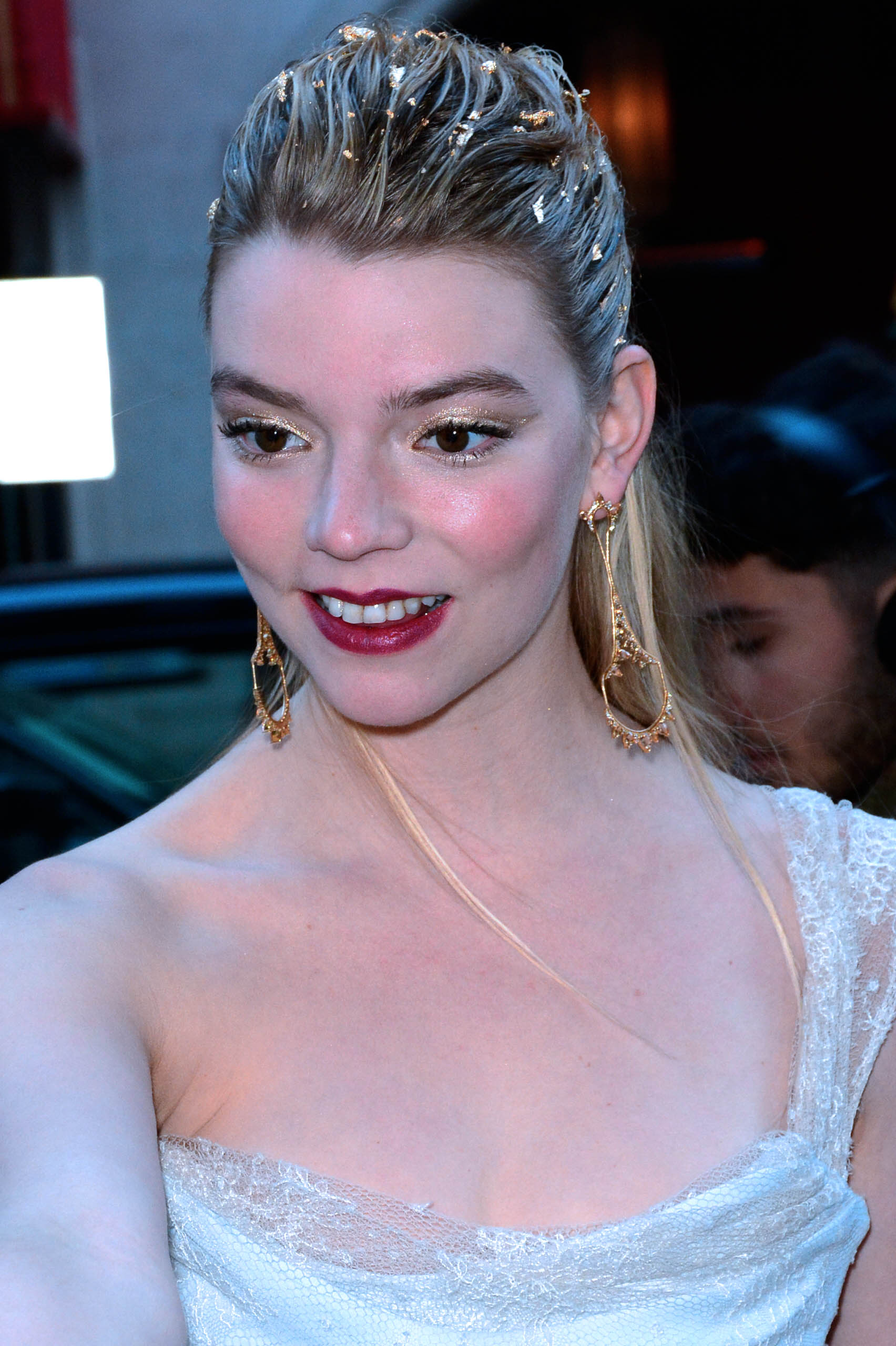
Anya Taylor-Joy, Outstanding Performance by a Female Actor in a Television Movie or Limited Series winner

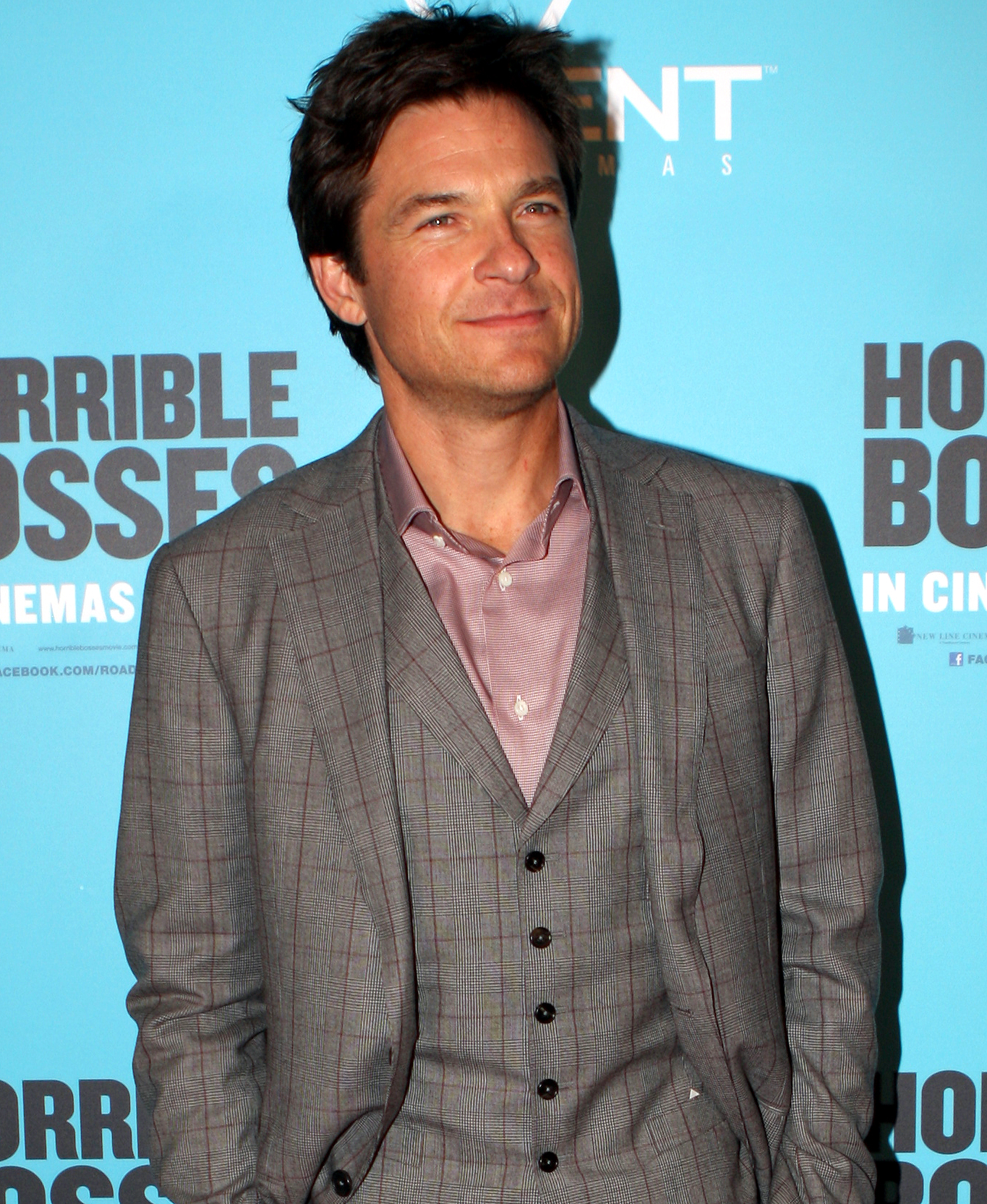
Jason Bateman, Outstanding Performance by a Male Actor in a Drama Series winner

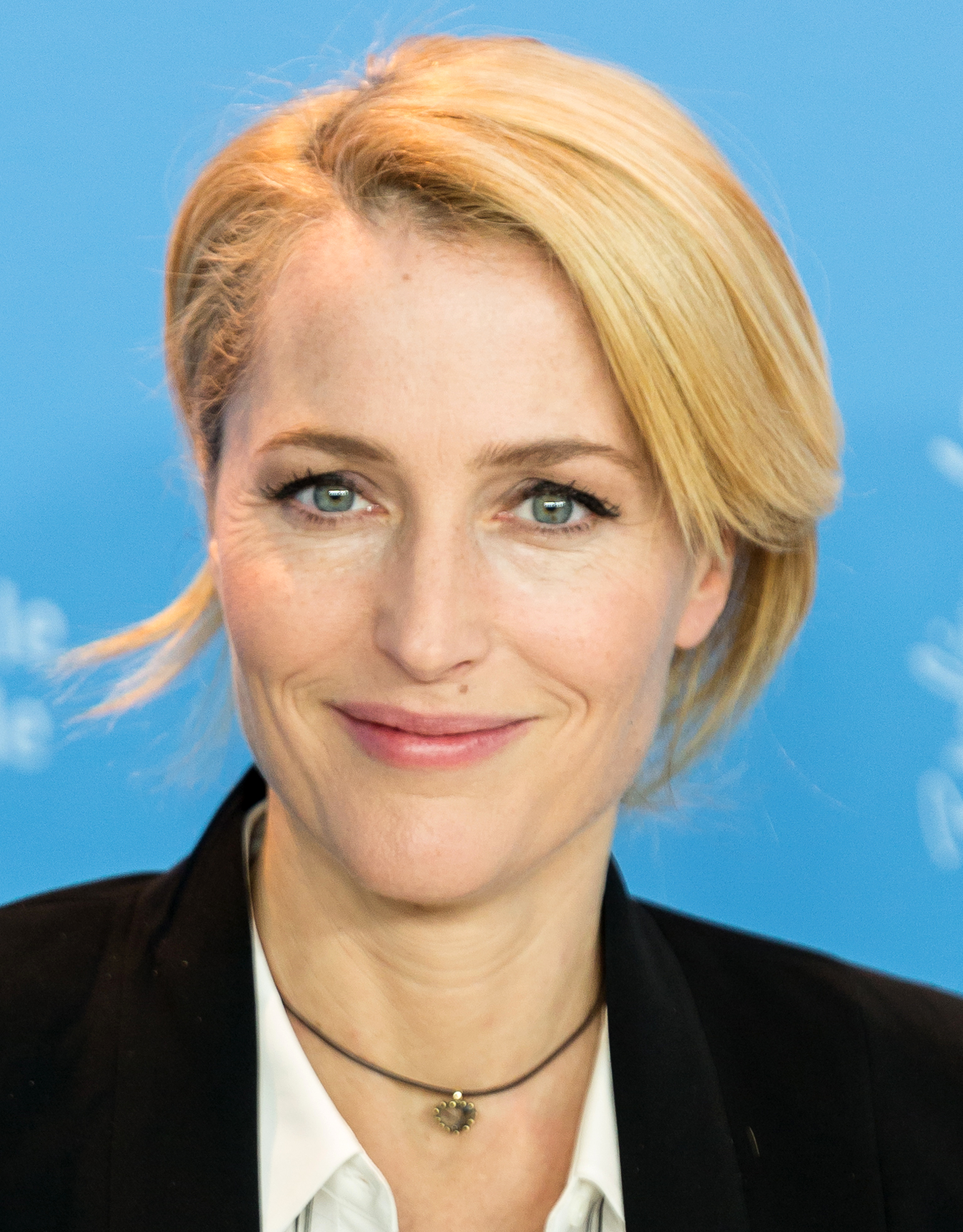
Gillian Anderson, Outstanding Performance by a Female Actor in a Drama Series winner

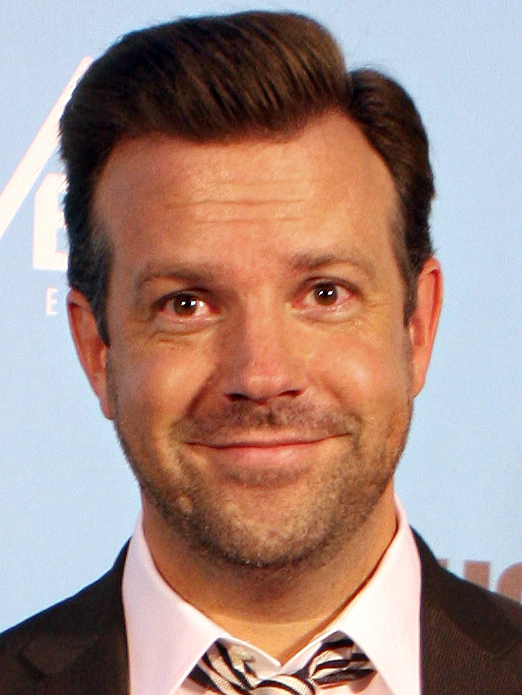
Jason Sudeikis, Outstanding Performance by a Male Actor in a Comedy Series winner

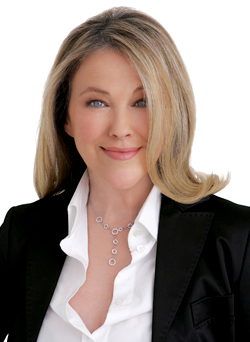
Catherine O'Hara, Outstanding Performance by a Female Actor in a Comedy Series winner

=== Film ===
Key
| † | Indicates a posthumous nomination |

| **Outstanding Performance by a Male Actor in a Leading Role**: **Chadwick Boseman † – Ma Rainey's Black Bottom as Levee Green**; Riz Ahmed – Sound of Metal as Ruben Stone; Anthony Hopkins – The Father as Anthony; Gary Oldman – Mank as Herman J. Mankiewicz; Steven Yeun – Minari as Jacob Yi | **Outstanding Performance by a Female Actor in a Leading Role**: **Viola Davis – Ma Rainey's Black Bottom as Ma Rainey**; Amy Adams – Hillbilly Elegy as Beverly "Bev" Vance; Vanessa Kirby – Pieces of a Woman as Martha Weiss; Frances McDormand – Nomadland as Fern; Carey Mulligan – Promising Young Woman as Cassandra "Cassie" Thomas |
| **Outstanding Performance by a Male Actor in a Supporting Role**: **Daniel Kaluuya – Judas and the Black Messiah as Fred Hampton**; Sacha Baron Cohen – The Trial of the Chicago 7 as Abbie Hoffman; Chadwick Boseman † – Da 5 Bloods as "Stormin'" Norman Earl Holloway; Jared Leto – The Little Things as Albert Sparma; Leslie Odom Jr. – One Night in Miami... as Sam Cooke | **Outstanding Performance by a Female Actor in a Supporting Role**: **Youn Yuh-jung – Minari as Soon-ja**; Maria Bakalova – Borat Subsequent Moviefilm as Tutar Sagdiyev; Glenn Close – Hillbilly Elegy as Bonnie "Mamaw" Vance; Olivia Colman – The Father as Anne; Helena Zengel – News of the World as Johanna Leonberger / Cicada |
**Outstanding Performance by a Cast in a Motion Picture**: **The Trial of the Chicago 7 – Yahya Abdul-Mateen II, Sacha Baron Cohen, Joseph Gordon-Levitt, Kelvin Harrison Jr., Michael Keaton, Frank Langella, John Carroll Lynch, Eddie Redmayne, Mark Rylance, Alex Sharp, and Jeremy Strong**; Da 5 Bloods – Chadwick Boseman †, Paul Walter Hauser, Nguyễn Ngọc Lâm, Lê Ý Lan, Norm Lewis, Delroy Lindo, Jonathan Majors, Van Veronica Ngo, Johnny Trí Nguyễn, Jasper Pääkkönen, Clarke Peters, Sandy Hương Phạm, Jean Reno, Mélanie Thierry, and Isiah Whitlock Jr.; Ma Rainey's Black Bottom – Chadwick Boseman †, Jonny Coyne, Viola Davis, Colman Domingo, Michael Potts, and Glynn Turman; Minari – Noel Kate Cho, Yeri Han, Scott Haze, Alan Kim, Will Patton, Steven Yeun, and Youn Yuh-jung; One Night in Miami... – Kingsley Ben-Adir, Beau Bridges, Lawrence Gilliard Jr., Eli Goree, Aldis Hodge, Michael Imperioli, Joaquina Kalukango, Leslie Odom Jr., Lance Reddick, and Nicolette Robinson
**Outstanding Performance by a Stunt Ensemble in a Motion Picture**: **Wonder Woman 1984**; Da 5 Bloods; Mulan; News of the World; The Trial of the Chicago 7

=== Television ===
| **Outstanding Performance by a Male Actor in a Television Movie or Limited Series**: **Mark Ruffalo – I Know This Much Is True (HBO) as Dominick and Thomas Birdsey**; Bill Camp – The Queen's Gambit (Netflix) as William Shaibel; Daveed Diggs – Hamilton (Disney+) as Marquis de Lafayette / Thomas Jefferson; Hugh Grant – The Undoing (HBO) as Jonathan Fraser; Ethan Hawke – The Good Lord Bird (Showtime) as John Brown | **Outstanding Performance by a Female Actor in a Television Movie or Limited Series**: **Anya Taylor-Joy – The Queen's Gambit (Netflix) as Beth Harmon**; Cate Blanchett – Mrs. America (FX on Hulu) as Phyllis Schlafly; Michaela Coel – I May Destroy You (BBC One / HBO) as Arabella Essiedu; Nicole Kidman – The Undoing (HBO) as Grace Fraser; Kerry Washington – Little Fires Everywhere (Hulu) as Mia Warren |
| **Outstanding Performance by a Male Actor in a Drama Series**: **Jason Bateman – Ozark (Netflix) as Martin "Marty" Byrde**; Sterling K. Brown – This Is Us (NBC) as Randall Pearson; Josh O'Connor – The Crown (Netflix) as Charles, Prince of Wales; Bob Odenkirk – Better Call Saul (AMC) as Jimmy McGill / Saul Goodman; Regé-Jean Page – Bridgerton (Netflix) as Simon Basset, Duke of Hastings | **Outstanding Performance by a Female Actor in a Drama Series**: **Gillian Anderson – The Crown (Netflix) as Margaret Thatcher**; Olivia Colman – The Crown (Netflix) as Queen Elizabeth II; Emma Corrin – The Crown (Netflix) as Diana, Princess of Wales; Julia Garner – Ozark (Netflix) as Ruth Langmore; Laura Linney – Ozark (Netflix) as Wendy Byrde |
| **Outstanding Performance by a Male Actor in a Comedy Series**: **Jason Sudeikis – Ted Lasso (Apple TV+) as Ted Lasso**; Nicholas Hoult – The Great (Hulu) as Peter III of Russia; Dan Levy – Schitt's Creek (Pop TV) as David Rose; Eugene Levy – Schitt's Creek (Pop TV) as Johnny Rose; Ramy Youssef – Ramy (Hulu) as Ramy Hassan | **Outstanding Performance by a Female Actor in a Comedy Series**: **Catherine O'Hara – Schitt's Creek (Pop TV) as Moira Rose**; Christina Applegate – Dead to Me (Netflix) as Jen Harding; Linda Cardellini – Dead to Me (Netflix) as Judy Hale; Kaley Cuoco – The Flight Attendant (HBO Max) as Cassie Bowden; Annie Murphy – Schitt's Creek (Pop TV) as Alexis Rose |
**Outstanding Performance by an Ensemble in a Drama Series**: **The Crown (Netflix) – Gillian Anderson, Marion Bailey, Helena Bonham Carter, Stephen Boxer, Olivia Colman, Emma Corrin, Erin Doherty, Charles Edwards, Emerald Fennell, Tobias Menzies, Josh O'Connor, and Sam Phillips**; Better Call Saul (AMC) – Jonathan Banks, Tony Dalton, Giancarlo Esposito, Patrick Fabian, Michael Mando, Bob Odenkirk, and Rhea Seehorn; Bridgerton (Netflix) – Adjoa Andoh, Julie Andrews, Lorraine Ashbourne, Jonathan Bailey, Ruby Barker, Jason Barnett, Sabrina Bartlett, Joanna Bobin, Harriet Cains, Bessie Carter, Nicola Coughlan, Kathryn Drysdale, Phoebe Dynevor, Ruth Gemmell, Florence Hunt, Martins Imhangbe, Claudia Jessie, Jessica Madsen, Molly McGlynn, Ben Miller, Luke Newton, Julian Ovenden, Regé-Jean Page, Golda Rosheuvel, Hugh Sachs, Luke Thompson, Will Tilston, and Polly Walker; Lovecraft Country (HBO) – Jamie Chung, Aunjanue Ellis, Jada Harris, Abbey Lee, Jonathan Majors, Wunmi Mosaku, Jordan Patrick Smith, Jurnee Smollett, and Michael Kenneth Williams; Ozark (Netflix) – Jason Bateman, McKinley Belcher III, Jessica Frances Dukes, Lisa Emery, Skylar Gaertner, Julia Garner, Sofia Hublitz, Kevin L. Johnson, Laura Linney, Janet McTeer, Tom Pelphrey, Joseph Sikora, Felix Solis, Charlie Tahan, and Madison Thompson
**Outstanding Performance by an Ensemble in a Comedy Series**: **Schitt's Creek (Pop TV) – Chris Elliott, Emily Hampshire, Dan Levy, Eugene Levy, Sarah Levy, Annie Murphy, Catherine O'Hara, Noah Reid, Jennifer Robertson, and Karen Robinson**; Dead to Me (Netflix) – Christina Applegate, Linda Cardellini, Max Jenkins, James Marsden, Sam McCarthy, Natalie Morales, Diana Maria Riva, and Luke Roessler; The Flight Attendant (HBO Max) – Kaley Cuoco, Merle Dandridge, Nolan Gerard Funk, Michelle Gomez, Michiel Huisman, Yasha Jackson, Jason Jones, T. R. Knight, Zosia Mamet, Audrey Grace Marshall, Griffin Matthews, Rosie Perez, Terry Serpico, and Colin Woodell; The Great (Hulu) – Belinda Bromilow, Sebastian de Souza, Sacha Dhawan, Elle Fanning, Phoebe Fox, Bayo Gbadamosi, Adam Godley, Douglas Hodge, Nicholas Hoult, Louis Hynes, Florence Keith-Roach, Gwilym Lee, Danusia Samal, and Charity Wakefield; Ted Lasso (Apple TV+) – Annette Badland, Phil Dunster, Brett Goldstein, Brendan Hunt, Toheeb Jimoh, James Lance, Nick Mohammed, Jason Sudeikis, Jeremy Swift, Juno Temple, and Hannah Waddingham
**Outstanding Performance by a Stunt Ensemble in a Comedy or Drama Series**: **The Mandalorian (Disney+)**; The Boys (Amazon Prime Video); Cobra Kai (Netflix); Lovecraft Country (HBO); Westworld (HBO)

== Multiple nominations ==
=== Film ===
| Nominations | Film |
|---|---|
| 3 | Da 5 Bloods |
| 3 | Ma Rainey's Black Bottom |
| 3 | Minari |
| 3 | The Trial of the Chicago 7 |
| 2 | The Father |
| 2 | Hillbilly Elegy |
| 2 | News of the World |
| 2 | One Night in Miami... |

=== Television ===
| Nominations | Program |
|---|---|
| 5 | The Crown |
| 5 | Schitt's Creek |
| 4 | Ozark |
| 3 | Dead to Me |
| 2 | Better Call Saul |
| 2 | Bridgerton |
| 2 | The Flight Attendant |
| 2 | The Great |
| 2 | Lovecraft Country |
| 2 | Ted Lasso |
| 2 | The Queen's Gambit |
| 2 | The Undoing |

== Multiple wins ==
=== Film ===
| Wins | Film |
|---|---|
| 2 | Ma Rainey's Black Bottom |

=== Television ===
| Wins | Program |
|---|---|
| 2 | The Crown |
| 2 | Schitt's Creek |

== In Memoriam ==
The segment honored the following who died in 2020 and early 2021:

- Cloris Leachman
- Thomas Jefferson Byrd
- Carl Reiner
- Dawn Wells
- Ja'Net DuBois
- Shirley Knight
- Max von Sydow
- Joyce Gordon
- Ian Holm
- Conchata Ferrell
- Irrfan Khan
- Naya Rivera
- Hal Holbrook
- Yaphet Kotto
- John Karlen
- Henry Darrow
- Warren Berlinger
- Fred Willard
- Jerry Stiller
- Natalie Desselle-Reid
- Kelly Preston
- Lyle Waggoner
- Zoe Caldwell
- Kellye Nakahara
- Ann Reinking
- Richard Herd
- Tommy Lister Jr.
- John Saxon
- Diana Rigg
- Ben Cross
- Olivia de Havilland
- Brian Dennehy
- Sean Connery
- George Segal
- Robert Conrad
- Honor Blackman
- Gregory Sierra
- Tanya Roberts
- David L. Lander
- Christopher Plummer
- Mark Blum
- Deezer D
- Mac Davis
- Bruce Kirby
- Lynn Cohen
- Orson Bean
- Kevin Dobson
- Dustin Diamond
- Jessica Walter
- Nick Cordero
- Peter Mark Richman
- Wilford Brimley
- Cicely Tyson
- Kirk Douglas
- Chadwick Boseman

== Presenters ==
The following individuals presented awards at the ceremony:

- Mindy Kaling with Outstanding Performance by a Male Actor in a Television Movie or Limited Series
- Riz Ahmed with Outstanding Performance by a Female Actor in a Television Movie or Limited Series
- Daveed Diggs with Outstanding Performance by a Male Actor in a Comedy Series
- Rita Moreno with Outstanding Performance by a Female Actor in a Comedy Series
- Jimmy Fallon with Outstanding Performance by an Ensemble in a Comedy Series
- Gabrielle Carteris presented SAG-AFTRA
- Cynthia Erivo with Outstanding Performance by a Male Actor in a Supporting Role
- Henry Golding with Outstanding Performance by a Female Actor in a Supporting Role
- Viola Davis presented "In Memoriam" segment
- Common with Outstanding Performance by a Female Actor in a Drama Series
- Lily Collins with Outstanding Performance by a Male Actor in a Drama Series
- Dan Levy with Outstanding Performance by an Ensemble in a Drama Series
- Ethan Hawke with Outstanding Performance by a Female Actor in a Leading Role
- Daisy Ridley with Outstanding Performance by a Male Actor in a Leading Role
- Helen Mirren with Outstanding Performance by a Cast in a Motion Picture
