= Washington D.C. Area Film Critics Association Awards 2020 =

Annual US film awards ceremony

19th WAFCA Awards
- Date: February 8, 2021

Highlights
- Best Film: Nomadland
- Best Director: Chloé Zhao – Nomadland
- Best Actor: Chadwick Boseman – Ma Rainey's Black Bottom (posthumous)
- Best Actress: Frances McDormand – Nomadland

The 19th Washington D.C. Area Film Critics Association Awards were announced on February 8, 2021. The nominations were announced on February 6, 2021.

== Winners and nominees ==
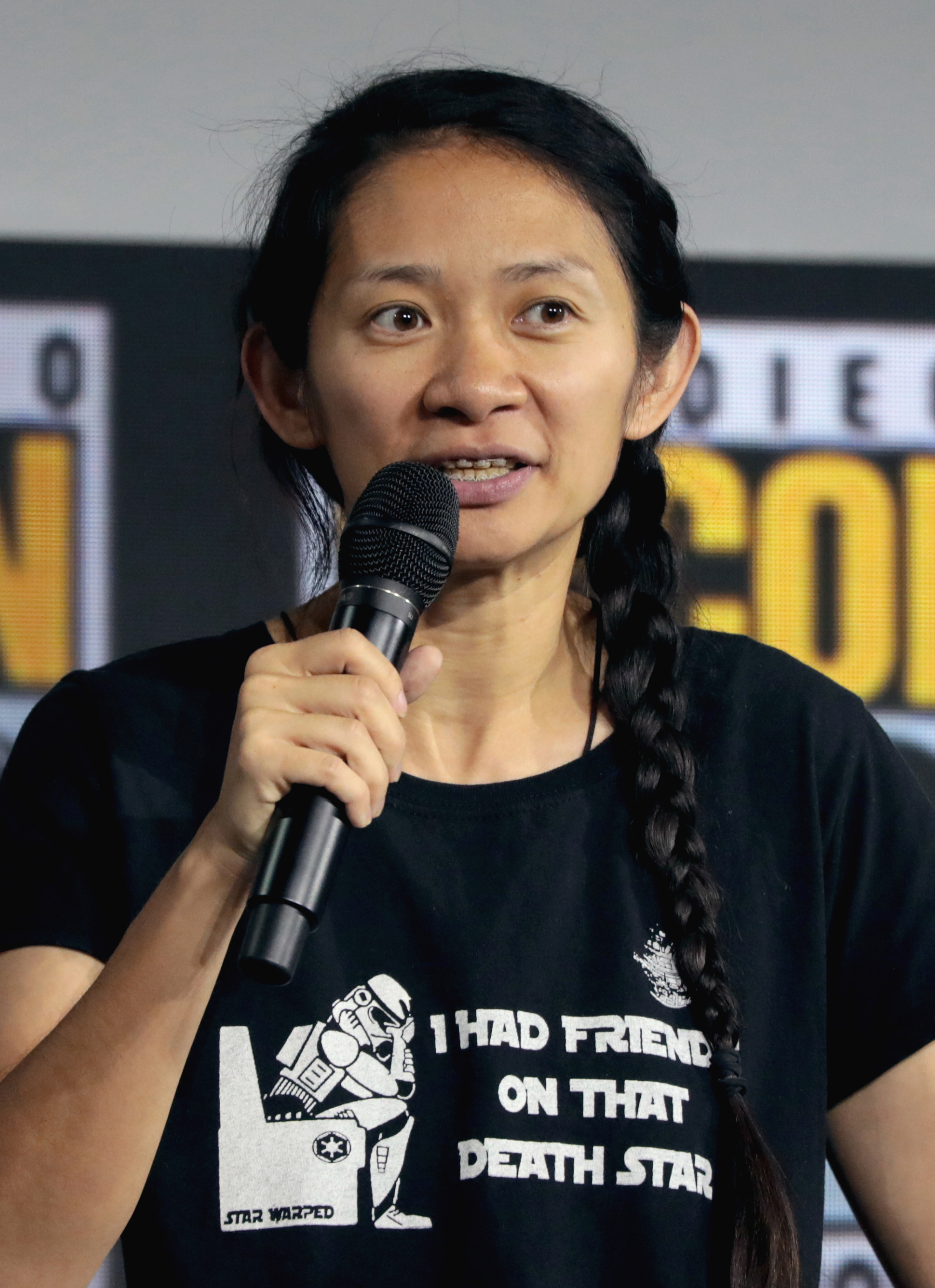
Chloé Zhao, Best Director and Best Adapted Screenplay winner

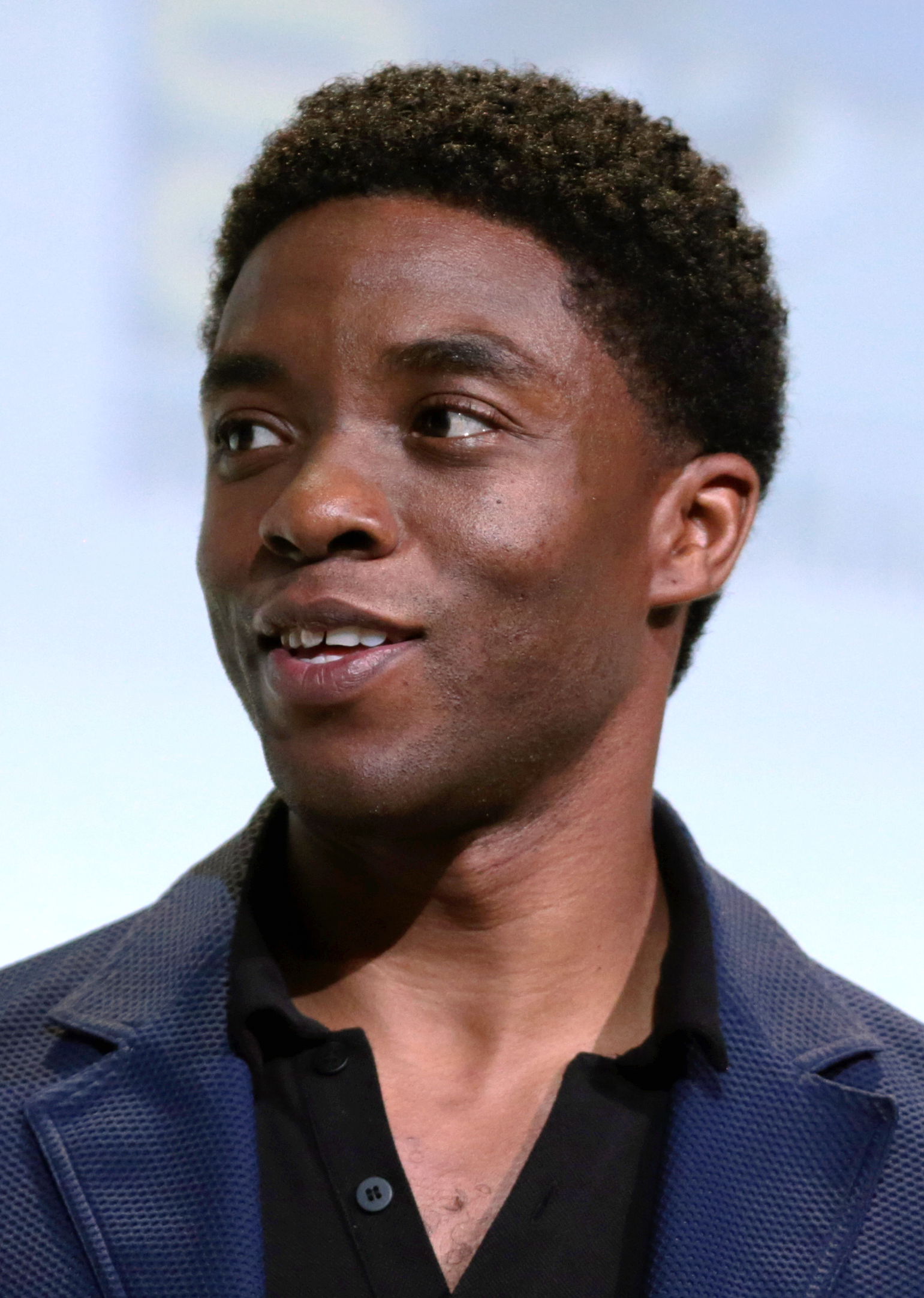
Chadwick Boseman, Best Actor winner

Frances McDormand, Best Actress winner

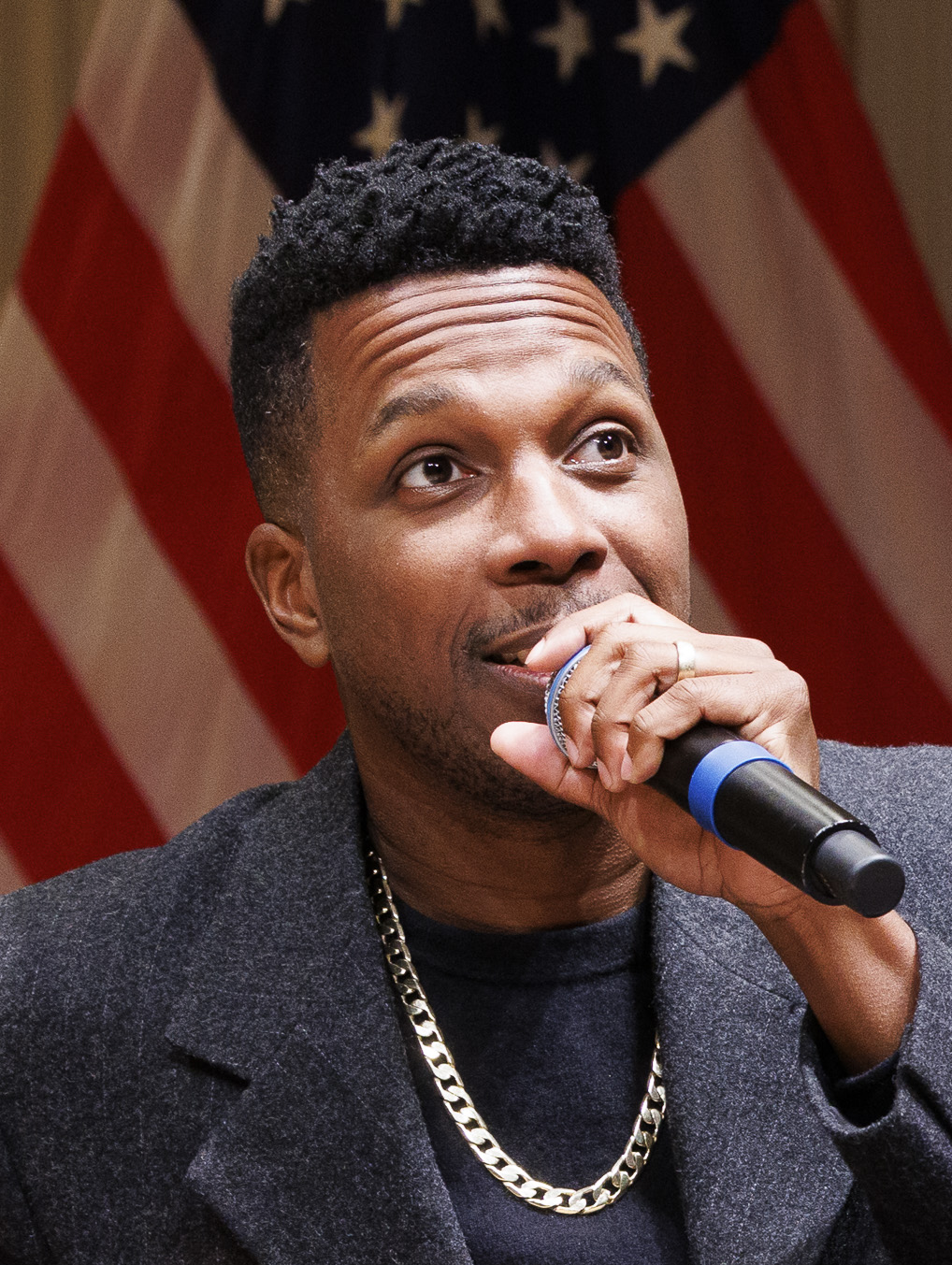
Leslie Odom Jr., Best Supporting Actor winner

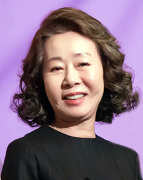
Youn Yuh-jung, Best Supporting Actress winner

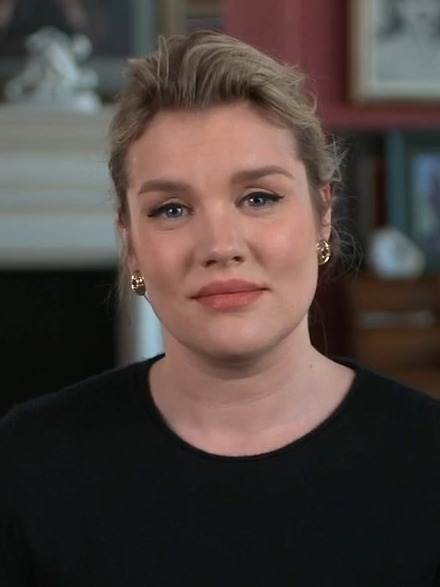
Emerald Fennell, Best Original Screenplay winner

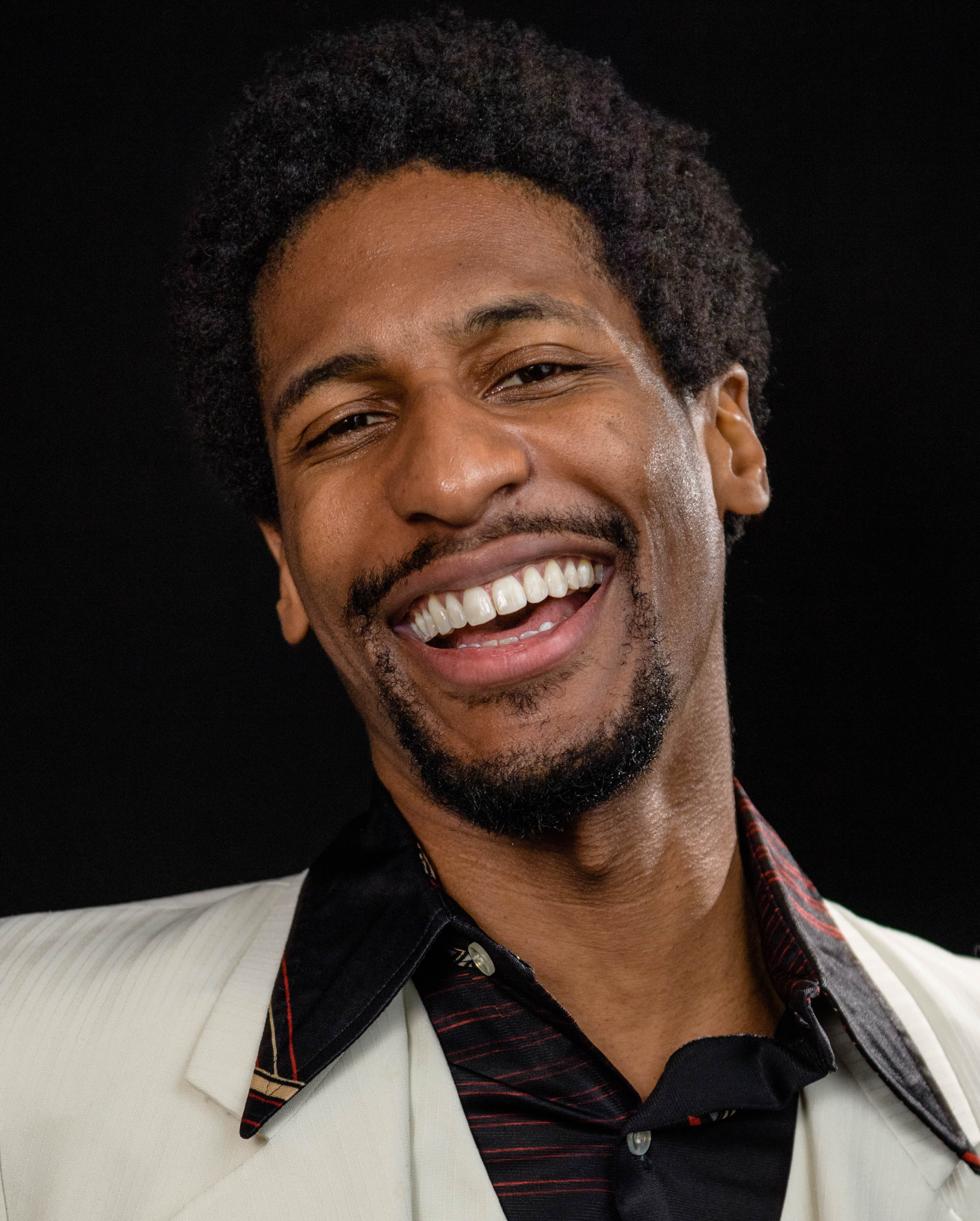
Jon Batiste, Best Original Score co-winner

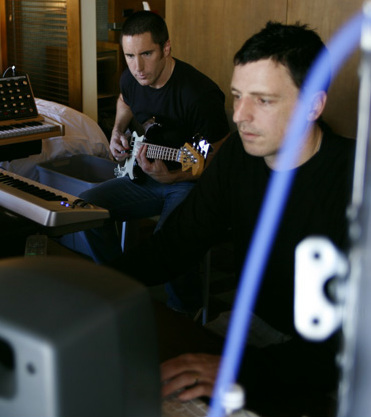
Trent Reznor (left) and Atticus Ross (right), Best Original Score co-winners

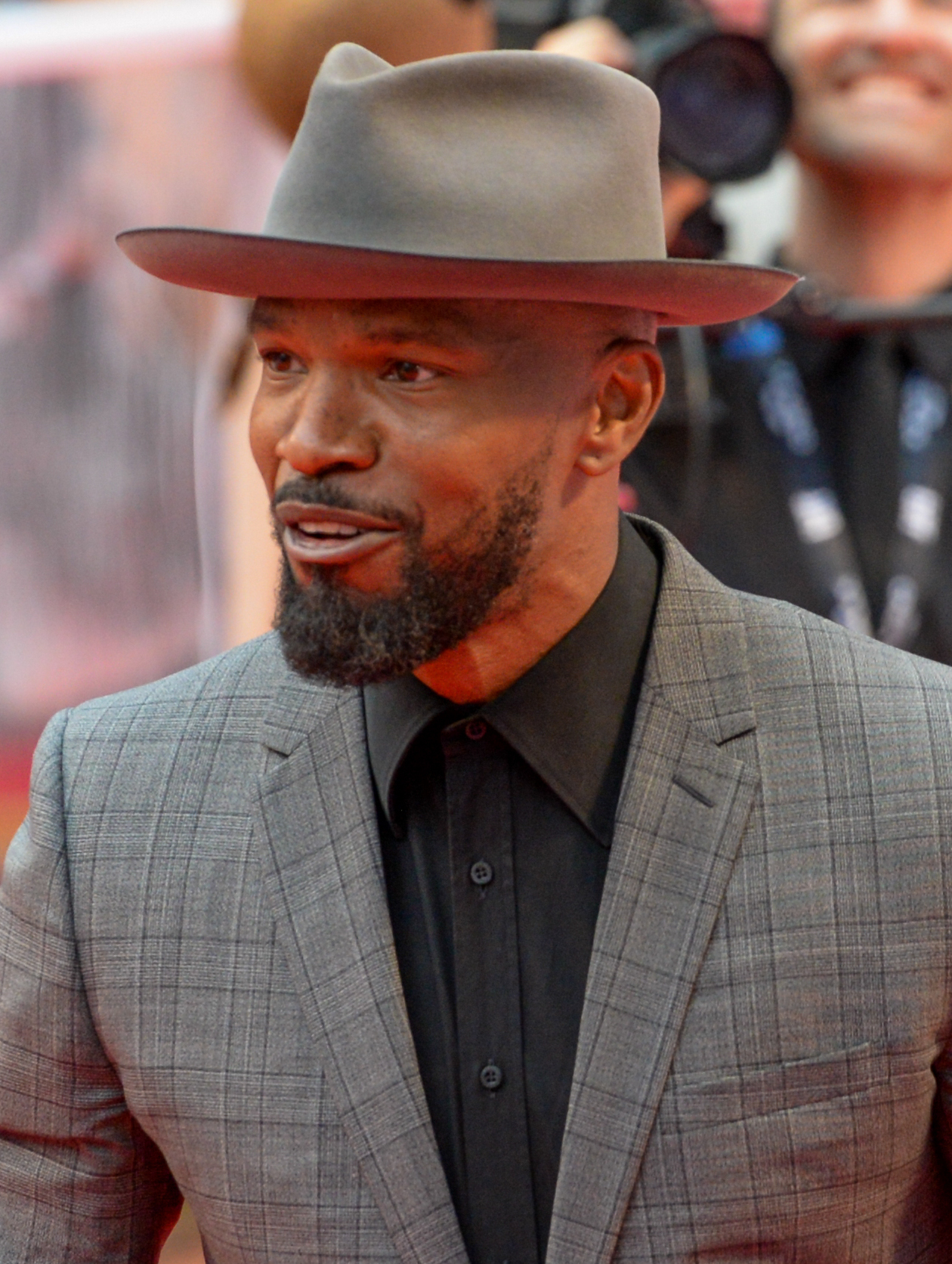
Jamie Foxx, Best Voice Performance winner

Best Film

- Nomadland
  - First Cow
  - Minari
  - One Night in Miami...
  - Promising Young Woman

Best Director

- Chloé Zhao – Nomadland
  - Lee Isaac Chung – Minari
  - Emerald Fennell – Promising Young Woman
  - Regina King – One Night in Miami...
  - Kelly Reichardt – First Cow

Best Actor

- Chadwick Boseman – Ma Rainey's Black Bottom as Levee Green (posthumous)
  - Riz Ahmed – Sound of Metal as Ruben Stone
  - Anthony Hopkins – The Father as Anthony
  - Delroy Lindo – Da 5 Bloods as Paul
  - Steven Yeun – Minari as Jacob Yi

Best Actress

- Frances McDormand – Nomadland as Fern
  - Viola Davis – Ma Rainey's Black Bottom as Ma Rainey
  - Vanessa Kirby – Pieces of a Woman as Martha Weiss
  - Elisabeth Moss – The Invisible Man as Cecilia Kass
  - Carey Mulligan – Promising Young Woman as Cassandra "Cassie" Thomas

Best Supporting Actor

- Leslie Odom Jr. – One Night in Miami... as Sam Cooke
  - Sacha Baron Cohen – The Trial of the Chicago 7 as Abbie Hoffman
  - Daniel Kaluuya – Judas and the Black Messiah as Fred Hampton
  - Bill Murray – On the Rocks as Felix Keane
  - Paul Raci – Sound of Metal as Joe

Best Supporting Actress

- Youn Yuh-jung – Minari as Soon-ja
  - Maria Bakalova – Borat Subsequent Moviefilm as Tutar Sagdiyev
  - Olivia Colman – The Father as Anne
  - Dominique Fishback – Judas and the Black Messiah as Deborah Johnson
  - Amanda Seyfried – Mank as Marion Davies

Best Original Screenplay

- Emerald Fennell – Promising Young Woman
  - Lee Isaac Chung – Minari
  - Darius Marder and Abraham Marder (story by Darius Marder and Derek Cianfrance) – Sound of Metal
  - Andy Siara – Palm Springs
  - Aaron Sorkin – The Trial of the Chicago 7

Best Adapted Screenplay

- Chloé Zhao – Nomadland
  - Charlie Kaufman – I'm Thinking of Ending Things
  - Kemp Powers – One Night in Miami...
  - Jonathan Raymond and Kelly Reichardt – First Cow
  - Ruben Santiago-Hudson – Ma Rainey's Black Bottom

Best Animated Feature

- Soul
  - The Croods: A New Age
  - Onward
  - Over the Moon
  - Wolfwalkers

Best Documentary Film

- Boys State
  - Collective
  - Crip Camp
  - Dick Johnson Is Dead
  - Time

Best International/Foreign Language Film

- Another Round
  - Bacurau
  - La Llorona
  - The Mole Agent
  - Night of the Kings

Best Cinematography

- Joshua James Richards – Nomadland
  - Erik Messerschmidt – Mank
  - Newton Thomas Sigel – Da 5 Bloods
  - Hoyte van Hoytema – Tenet
  - Dariusz Wolski – News of the World

Best Editing

- Jennifer Lame – Tenet
  - Alan Baumgarten – The Trial of the Chicago 7
  - Kirk Baxter – Mank
  - Mikkel E. G. Nielsen – Sound of Metal
  - Chloé Zhao – Nomadland

Best Original Score

- Jon Batiste, Trent Reznor, and Atticus Ross – Soul
  - Ludwig Göransson – Tenet
  - James Newton Howard – News of the World
  - Emile Mosseri – Minari
  - Trent Reznor and Atticus Ross – Mank

Best Production Design

- Donald Graham Burt (production design) and Jan Pascale (set decoration) – Mank
  - David Crank (production design) and Elizabeth Keenan (set decoration) – News of the World
  - Nathan Crowley (production design) and Kathy Lucas (set decoration) – Tenet
  - Kave Quinn (production design) and Stella Fox (set decoration) – Emma
  - Mark Ricker (production design) and Karen O'Hara (set decoration) – Ma Rainey's Black Bottom

Best Acting Ensemble

- One Night in Miami...
  - Da 5 Bloods
  - Ma Rainey's Black Bottom
  - Minari
  - The Trial of the Chicago 7

Best Youth Performance

- Alan Kim – Minari as David Yi
  - Millie Bobby Brown – Enola Holmes as Enola Holmes
  - Sidney Flanigan – Never Rarely Sometimes Always as Autumn Callaghan
  - Talia Ryder – Never Rarely Sometimes Always as Skylar
  - Helena Zengel – News of the World as Johanna Leonberger

Best Voice Performance

- Jamie Foxx – Soul as Joe Gardner
  - Tina Fey – Soul as 22
  - Tom Holland – Onward as Ian Lightfoot
  - Honor Kneafsey – Wolfwalkers as Robyn Goodfellowe
  - Octavia Spencer – Onward as Corey

The Joe Barber Award for Best Portrayal of Washington, D.C.

- Wonder Woman 1984
  - Crip Camp
  - The Fight
  - Jimmy Carter: Rock & Roll President
  - John Lewis: Good Trouble

== Multiple nominations and wins ==
The following films received multiple nominations:

Nominations	Film
8	Minari
6	Nomadland
5	Ma Rainey's Black Bottom
5	Mank
5	One Night in Miami...
4	News of the World
4	Promising Young Woman
4	Soul
4	Sound of Metal
4	Tenet
4	The Trial of the Chicago 7
3	Da 5 Bloods
3	First Cow
3	Onward
2	Crip Camp
2	The Father
2	Judas and the Black Messiah
2	Never Rarely Sometimes Always
2	Wolfwalkers

The following films received multiple awards:

Wins	Film
5	Nomadland
3	Soul
2	Minari
2	One Night in Miami...
