= Minari =

2020 American drama film by Lee Isaac Chung

- Release poster
- Directed by: Lee Isaac Chung
- Written by: Lee Isaac Chung
- Produced by: Dede Gardner; Jeremy Kleiner; Christina Oh
- Starring: Steven Yeun; Han Ye-ri; Alan Kim; Noel Kate Cho; Youn Yuh-jung; Will Patton
- Cinematography: Lachlan Milne
- Edited by: Harry Yoon
- Music by: Emile Mosseri
- Production company: Plan B
- Distributed by: A24
- Release dates: January 26, 2020 (Sundance); December 11, 2020 (United States)
- Running time: 115 minutes
- Country: United States
- Languages: Korean; English
- Budget: $2 million
- Box office: $15.5 million

Minari (Korean: 미나리; lit. 'water celery'; [minaɾi]) is a 2020 American drama film written and directed by Lee Isaac Chung. It stars Steven Yeun, Han Ye-ri, Alan Kim, Noel Kate Cho, Youn Yuh-jung, and Will Patton. A semi-autobiographical take on Chung's upbringing, its plot follows a family of South Korean immigrants who move to rural Arkansas during the 1980s.

Minari had its world premiere at the 2020 Sundance Film Festival on January 26, 2020, winning both the U.S. Dramatic Grand Jury Prize and the U.S. Dramatic Audience Award. It began a one-week virtual release on December 11, 2020, and was released theatrically and via virtual cinema on February 12, 2021, by A24.

The film received critical acclaim, with praise for Chung's direction and screenplay, Yeun's and Youn's performances, and the score. Both the National Board of Review and the American Film Institute named Minari one of the best films of 2020, and it has since been cited as one of the best films of the 21st century. At the 93rd Academy Awards, it earned six nominations, including Best Picture, and won Best Supporting Actress for Youn, who became the first Korean actor to win an Oscar. Minari also won the Golden Globe Award for Best Foreign Language Film, was nominated for the Screen Actors Guild Award for Outstanding Performance by a Cast in a Motion Picture, and earned six nominations at the 74th British Academy Film Awards, including Best Film Not in the English Language.

== Plot ==
In 1983, a family of South Korean immigrants moves away from California. The father, Jacob Yi, believes the soil in Arkansas is fertile enough to grow Korean produce to sell to vendors in Dallas. He declines to use a water diviner and digs a well in a spot he chooses himself. He is helped by Paul, an eccentric Korean War veteran who is fervently religious and occasionally speaks in tongues. Jacob's optimism is not shared by his wife, Monica, who is disappointed with their mobile home and the distance from urban amenities. Their son, David, has heart murmurs that they monitor, frequently reminding him not to run. The couple work sexing chicks at a nearby hatchery and argue frequently while David and his sister, Anne, eavesdrop. Monica's mother, Soon-ja, travels from South Korea to live with them and watch the children. Forced to share his room, David avoids Soon-ja because she doesn't fit his idea of a grandmother. When Jacob's well runs dry, he refuses to pay for county water. The vendor in Dallas unexpectedly cancels their produce order, and Monica strives to return to California.

Soon-ja plants minari seeds by the creek with David, telling him how resilient and useful the plant is. David warms to her after she teaches him hwatu, bandages his wounds, and soothes his fears over his heart condition. Soon-ja also encourages him to do more physical activity, saying he is stronger than his parents think. When Soon-ja suffers a stroke, she is left with impaired movement and speech. Monica considers taking her and David back to California.

Jacob and Monica travel with David to Oklahoma City. A medical specialist reports that David's condition has improved and that he no longer requires surgery. Jacob makes a deal to sell his vegetables to a Korean grocer. When Jacob inadvertently reveals that his crops' success is more important to him than their family's stability, the couple argue over their ability to support each other and agree to separate. They return home to find that Soon-ja accidentally set fire to the barn containing the produce. Jacob and Monica rush in to save the crops, but the fire grows out of control, and they end up saving each other as the barn is destroyed. Overwhelmed with guilt, Soon-ja attempts to flee, but David blocks her path, and the children lead her home by the hand. That night, the exhausted family sleeps together on the floor, as Soon-ja sits and watches over them.

Jacob permits the water diviner to spot his new well, signifying their intention to stay. David shows Jacob the minari harvest by the creek. Jacob notes Soon-ja had picked a good spot to plant it.

== Cast ==
- Steven Yeun as Jacob Yi
- Han Ye-ri as Monica Yi
- Alan Kim as David Yi
- Noel Kate Cho as Anne Yi (Ji-young, 지영)
- Youn Yuh-jung as Soon-ja (순자)
- Will Patton as Paul
- Scott Haze as Billy
- Jacob Wade as Johnnie
- Skip Schwink as Doctor

== Production ==
=== Development ===
Chung had initially hoped to make an adaptation of My Ántonia by Willa Cather but found out that Cather did not want film adaptations of her works to be made. He was inspired to make a film about his childhood instead.

Chung wrote the screenplay for Minari in 2018 shortly before taking on an instructor position at the University of Utah Asia Campus in Songdo, South Korea. He cited Cather and Fyodor Dostoevsky as inspirations during the writing process, recalling the former's saying "that her life really began when she stopped admiring and started remembering". In an interview with The Los Angeles Times, Chung spoke about the challenges of drawing on his family's experiences: "It was very difficult in the sense that I know that my parents are private people. And I didn't even tell them that I was making this film until I was in the editing room with it after I had shot it, because I was just so scared about what they would say."

Chung wrote the script in English. Some dialogue was translated into colloquial Korean by Hong Yeo-ul, in consultation with Chung and the actors; Han and Youn assisted in the translation efforts.

In early 2019, Christina Oh and Plan B Entertainment signed on as producers of the film. Oh later brought on A24 to distribute it.

=== Casting ===
In July 2019, it was announced that Steven Yeun, Han Ye-ri, Youn Yuh-jung, Will Patton, and Scott Haze had joined the film's cast.

Han initially felt she could not participate because she needed to film Nokdu Flower and suggested Chun Woo-hee as an alternate, as she felt it was important that a Korean-born woman portray Monica. Han said that, of the main characters, Monica "seemed to be the most Korean", due to her difficulties with living in the U.S., and she felt it was important an actress born in South Korea, natively speaking Korean, take the role.

=== Filming ===
Principal photography began in July 2019 in Tulsa, Oklahoma. Filming lasted 25 days. In order to make a deadline for Sundance, editor Harry Yoon edited the film as production took place.

Youn previously lived in the U.S. and drew on that experience in her performance. Chung told her not to play Soon-ja like Chung's grandmother, a direction Youn welcomed. Chung also took Youn's suggestions, including one where her character takes back money her daughter had just put into a church collection plate, even though Chung's religious background made him hesitant about that idea. According to Youn, Chung intended for Soon-ja to be alive at the end of the story. Han used her own mother's life as inspiration for her portrayal of Monica.

== Release ==
The film had its world premiere at the Sundance Film Festival on January 26, 2020. It screened at several other festivals, including Deauville, Valladolid, Hamptons, Heartland, and Montclair.

Initially, the film was set for a limited release on December 11, 2020, before slowly expanding to a wide release on February 12, 2021. However, the theatrical release was curtailed due to the COVID-19 pandemic. It came out in select theaters and virtual cinemas for one week on December 11, 2020. It opened theatrically on February 12, along with virtual cinema screenings through A24's website. It was released on video-on-demand on February 26, 2021.

Minari was screened at the 28th Busan International Film Festival as part of "Korean American Special Exhibition: Korean Diaspora" on October 5, 2023.

== Reception ==
=== Box office and VOD ===
As of 27 May 2021, Minari had grossed $3.1 million in the United States and Canada, and $12.5 million in other territories, for a worldwide of $15.5 million.

IndieWire reported the film likely made $150–200,000 from about 245 theaters. It ended making $193,000 on its first weekend. It made an estimated $63,000 in its second weekend and $53,000 in its third, for a running total of $251,000. The same weekend, the film placed fifth on Apple TV's PVOD rental charts, sixth on FandangoNow, and eighth on Google Play. It made $68,000 in its fourth weekend in the U.S. as well as $2.2 million in South Korea and $1 million in Australia and New Zealand, then $56,000 in its fifth weekend. The weekend following its six Oscar nominations, the film made $306,000 from 786 theaters.

=== Critical response ===
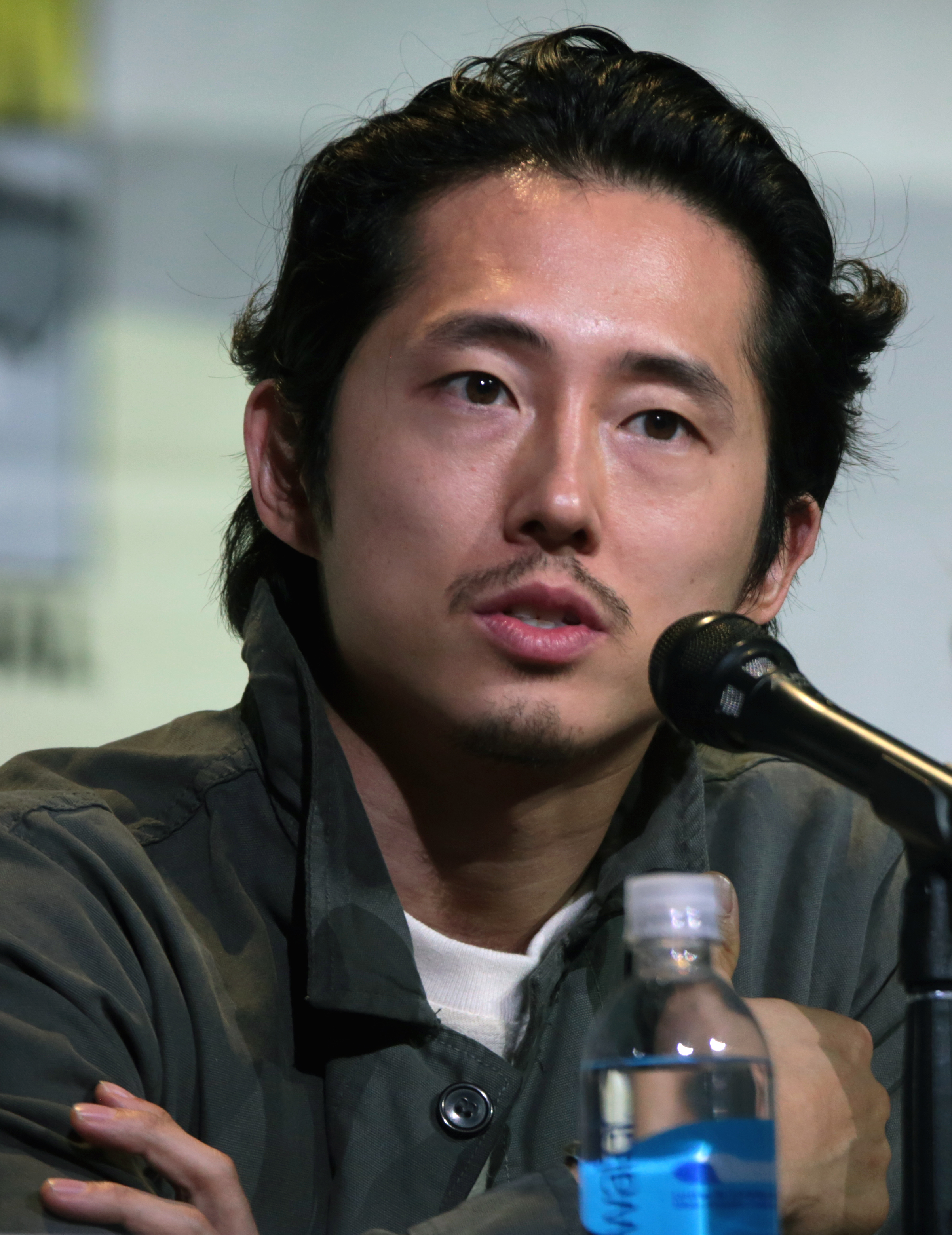
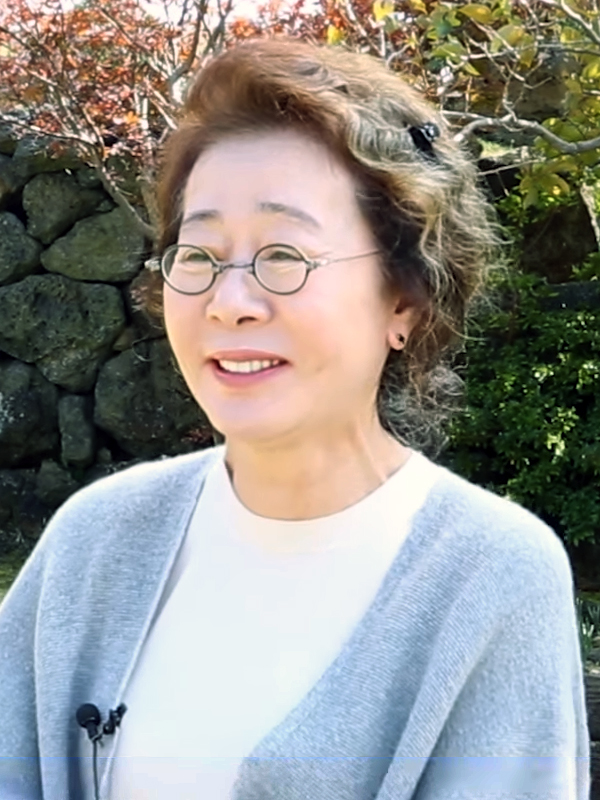
The performances of Steven Yeun and Youn Yuh-jung received critical acclaim, earning them Academy Award nominations for Best Actor and Best Supporting Actress, respectively, with Youn winning in her category.

On Rotten Tomatoes, 98% of 318 reviews were positive, with an average rating of 8.7/10. The site's critics consensus reads: "Led by arresting performances from Steven Yeun and Yeri Han, Minari offers an intimate and heart-wrenching portrait of family and assimilation in 1980s America." Metacritic assigned the film a weighted average score 89 out of 100, based on 49 critics, indicating "universal acclaim".

A. O. Scott of The New York Times gave the film a positive review, writing: "Minari is modest, specific and thrifty, like the lives it surveys. There's nothing small about it, though, because it operates at the true scale of life." Nicholas Barber at the BBC rated the film 5/5, writing, "Sensitively written and acted, beautifully shot, and with a charming, sparingly used score, Minari is so engaging that it's easy to forget how radical it is." Reviewing the film for the Associated Press, Lindsey Bahr gave the film 4/4 stars, reporting, "One of the great triumphs of Minari is its presentation of authentic childhood. These kids are not saints or stand-ins or mouthpieces. They are their own persons."

Robbie Collin of The Telegraph rated the film 4/5, writing, "Lee Isaac Chung's tender story is a finely observed portrait of family relations and rural American values". Benjamin Lee at The Guardian also rated the film 4/5, writing, "The autobiographical story of a Korean American family trying to sustain a farm in rural Arkansas has deservedly become the festival's most universally loved film".

Filmmaker Bong Joon-ho praised the film, saying, "I think it takes a lot of courage to shoot a film about yourself or your family, since it's autobiographical. But what I appreciated more about this film is that it doesn't wallow in nostalgia. It's a story about [Chung], but there's a sense of distance too. So rather than it being about the history and story of a Korean immigrant family, the film can appeal to families all over the world or anyone who still carries the memories of their parents."

Minari appeared on 68 critics' year-end top-ten lists, including first place on five year-end lists and second place on nine. In 2023, it ranked ninth on Collider's list of "The 20 Best Drama Movies of the 2020s So Far". Marie Claire also included it on its list of "The 100 Best Movies of All Time."

The May 2021 issue of New York Magazine lists Minari as among "The Best Movies That Lost Best Picture at the Oscars."

In 2024, the website Looper ranked it number 34 on its list of "50 Best PG-13 Movies of All Time", writing, "Everyone has got a story to tell and the quietly powerful filmmaking of Minari conveys this truth magnificently. That's not the only place Chung's directorial vision impresses, though, as subtly detailed instances of filming things through the points-of-view of other characters — as well as the specific details of each central family member — reflect what a masterfully conceived project this is." In June 2025, IndieWire ranked the film at number 86 on its list of "100 Best Movies of the 2020s (So Far)".

=== Accolades ===
Minari premiered at the 2020 Sundance Film Festival, where it received the U.S. Dramatic Grand Jury Prize and the U.S. Dramatic Audience Award. It was named one of the ten best films of 2020 by the American Film Institute and the National Board of Review, and received six nominations at the 93rd Academy Awards: Best Picture, Best Director, Best Original Score, Best Original Screenplay, Best Actor (Yeun), and Best Supporting Actress (Youn). It also received three Screen Actors Guild Award nominations, ten Critics' Choice Movie Awards nominations, and six Independent Spirit Award nominations.

At the 78th Golden Globe Awards (given by the Hollywood Foreign Press Association), the film won for Best Foreign Language Film. The determination that the film would be eligible for this category rather than Best Motion Picture – Drama, based on the Globes' rule that any film with over 50% of its dialogue not in English would be considered a foreign-language film, invited controversy. Lulu Wang, whose film The Farewell was subject to the same rule the previous year, wrote: "I have not seen a more American film than #Minari this year. It's a story about an immigrant family, IN America, pursuing the American dream. We really need to change these antiquated rules that characterize American as only English-speaking." Author Viet Thanh Nguyen wrote that the "decision speaks powerfully to the issue of what makes something—a language or a person or a culture—foreign". Many other filmmakers, actors, and authors, including Daniel Dae Kim, Simu Liu, Harry Shum Jr., Franklin Leonard, Phil Lord, Nia DaCosta, Celeste Ng, Min Jin Lee, and Phillipa Soo, criticized the decision on similar grounds.

== Bibliography ==
- Ito, Robert (February 6, 2021). "A Director Returns to the Home He Longed to Leave". The New York Times.
- "Minari Q&A with Lee Isaac Chung, Steven Yeun, Yeri Han, Yuh-Jung Youn, Alan Kim & Noel Cho". Film at Lincoln Center. December 21, 2020. Archived from the original on November 13, 2021.
- "Minari star Steve Yeun on portraying the American Dream". CBS Sunday Morning. February 7, 2021. Archived from the original on November 13, 2021.
