= 4th Hollywood Critics Association Film Awards =

Hollywood Critics Association Film Awards

4th Hollywood Critics Association Awards
- Date: March 5, 2021
- Site: Virtual Presentation via Facebook and YouTube
- Hosted by: Scott Menzel
- Official website: hollywoodcriticsassociation.com

Highlights
- Best Picture: Promising Young Woman
- Most awards: Promising Young Woman (4)
- Most nominations: Promising Young Woman (9)

The 4th Hollywood Critics Association Film Awards, presented by the Hollywood Critics Association, took place virtually on March 5, 2021. The ceremony was hosted by HCA Founder Scott Menzel.

The nominations were announced on February 1, 2021.

== Winners and nominees ==
Winners are listed first and highlighted with boldface.

**Best Picture**: **Promising Young Woman**; Da 5 Bloods; The Father; Judas and the Black Messiah; Minari; Nomadland; One Night in Miami...; Soul; Sound of Metal; The Trial of the Chicago 7
**Best Female Director**: **Chloé Zhao – Nomadland**; Eliza Hittman – Never Rarely Sometimes Always; Emerald Fennell – Promising Young Woman; Regina King – One Night in Miami...; Sofia Coppola – On the Rocks	**Best Male Director**: **Darius Marder – Sound of Metal**; David Fincher – Mank; Lee Isaac Chung – Minari; Shaka King – Judas and the Black Messiah; Spike Lee – Da 5 Bloods
**Best Actor**: **Delroy Lindo – Da 5 Bloods as Paul**; Anthony Hopkins – The Father as Anthony; Chadwick Boseman – Ma Rainey's Black Bottom as Levee Green (posthumous nomination); Kingsley Ben-Adir – One Night in Miami... as Malcolm X; Riz Ahmed – Sound of Metal as Ruben Stone	**Best Actress**: **Carey Mulligan – Promising Young Woman as Cassandra Thomas**; Elisabeth Moss – The Invisible Man as Cecilia Kass; Frances McDormand – Nomadland as Fern; Vanessa Kirby – Pieces of a Woman as Martha Weiss; Viola Davis – Ma Rainey's Black Bottom as Ma Rainey; Zendaya – Malcolm & Marie as Marie Jones
**Best Supporting Actor**: **Paul Raci – Sound of Metal as Joe**; Bo Burnham – Promising Young Woman as Ryan Cooper; Chadwick Boseman – Da 5 Bloods as Norman “Stormin' Norman” Earl Holloway (posthumous nomination); Daniel Kaluuya – Judas and the Black Messiah as Fred Hampton; Leslie Odom, Jr. – One Night in Miami... as Sam Cooke	**Best Supporting Actress**: **Youn Yuh-jung – Minari as Soonja**; Amanda Seyfried – Mank as Marion Davies; Ellen Burstyn – Pieces of a Woman as Elizabeth Weiss; Glenn Close – Hillbilly Elegy as Bonnie “Mamaw” Vance; Olivia Colman – The Father as Anne
**Best Cast Ensemble**: **Da 5 Bloods**; Ma Rainey's Black Bottom; One Night in Miami...; The Prom; Promising Young Woman; The Trial of the Chicago 7	**Best Animated or VSX Performance**: **Ben Schwartz – Sonic the Hedgehog as Sonic the Hedgehog**; Cathy Ang – Over the Moon as Fei Fei; Honor Kneafsey – Wolfwalkers as Robyn Goodfellowe; Jamie Foxx – Soul as Joe Gardner; Tina Fey – Soul as 22
**Best Original Screenplay**: **Emerald Fennell – Promising Young Woman**; Aaron Sorkin – The Trial of the Chicago 7; Abraham Marder and Darius Marder – Sound of Metal; Andy Siara – Palm Springs; Lee Isaac Chung – Minari	**Best Adapted Screenplay**: **Kemp Powers – One Night in Miami...**; Chloé Zhao – Nomadland; Florian Zeller – The Father; Jonathan Raymond and Kelly Reichardt – First Cow; Ruben Santiago-Hudson – Ma Rainey's Black Bottom
**Best Action Film**: **Birds of Prey**; The Old Guard; Sonic the Hedgehog; Tenet; Wonder Woman 1984	**Best Animated Film**: **Wolfwalkers**; The Croods: A New Age; Onward; Over the Moon; Soul
**Best Comedy or Musical**: **Palm Springs**; Eurovision Song Contest: The Story of Fire Saga; On the Rocks; The Personal History of David Copperfield; The Prom	**Best Documentary**: **All In: The Fight for Democracy (TIE)**; **Class Action Park (TIE)**; Boys State; Dick Johnson Is Dead; Time
**Best Horror**: **The Invisible Man**; Freaky; His House; Host; Relic	**Best Indie Film**: **Minari**; Black Bear; First Cow; Miss Juneteenth; Palm Springs
**Best International Film**: **La Llorona**; Another Round; Bacurau; I'm No Longer Here; Two of Us	**Best First Feature**: **Emerald Fennell – Promising Young Woman**; Channing Godfrey Peoples – Miss Juneteenth; Darius Marder – Sound of Metal; Radha Blank – The 40-Year-Old Version; Regina King – One Night in Miami...
**Best Short Film**: **The Heart Still Hums**; Burrow; Canvas; Cops And Robbers; If Anything Happens, I Love You	**Best Score**: **Jon Batiste, Trent Reznor and Atticus Ross – Soul**; Alexandre Desplat – The Midnight Sky; Emile Mosseri – Minari; James Newton Howard – News of the World; Trent Reznor and Atticus Ross – Mank
**Best Original Song**: **"Husavik (My Hometown)", sung by Will Ferrell and My Marianne – Eurovision Song Contest: The Story of Fire Saga**; "Rocket to the Moon", sung by Cathy Ang – Over the Moon; "Speak Now", sung by Leslie Odom, Jr. – One Night in Miami...; "Turntables", sung by Janelle Monáe – All In: The Fight for Democracy; "Wear Your Crown", sung by Ariana DeBose, Jo Ellen Pellman, Kerry Washington, Nicole Kidman and Meryl Streep – The Prom	**Best Cinematography**: **Joshua James Richards – Nomadland**; Dariusz Wolski – News of the World; Erik Messerschmidt – Mank; Hoyte Van Hoytema – Tenet; Martin Ruhe – The Midnight Sky
**Best Production Design**: **Donald Graham Burt – Mank**; Cristina Casali – The Personal History of David Copperfield; Jamie Walker McCall – The Prom; Kave Quinn – Emma; Mark Ricker – Ma Rainey's Black Bottom	**Best Film Editing**: **Alan Baumgarten – The Trial of the Chicago 7**; Andy Canny – The Invisible Man; Chloé Zhao – Nomadland; Frédéric Thoraval – Promising Young Woman; Yorgos Lamprinos – The Father
**Best Stunts**: **Birds of Prey**; Extraction; The Old Guard; Tenet; Wonder Woman 1984	**Best Costume Design**: **Suzie Harman and Robert Worley – The Personal History of David Copperfield**; Alexandra Byrne – Emma; Ann Roth – Ma Rainey's Black Bottom; Erin Benach – Birds of Prey; Trish Summerville – Mank
**Best Hair & Makeup**: **Matiki Anoff, Sergio López-Rivera, Mia Neal, Larry M. Cherry, Sian Richards, Deidra Dixon and Jamika Wilson – Ma Rainey's Black Bottom**; Angie Wells and Daniel Curet – Promising Young Woman; Deborah La Mia Denaver and Adruitha Lee – Birds of Prey; Eryn Krueger Mekash, Patricia Dehaney and Matthew W. Mungle – Hillbilly Elegy; Kimberley Spiteri, Colleen LaBaff, Gigi Williams and Michelle Audrina Kim – Mank	**Best Visual Effects**: **Jonathan Dearing – The Invisible Man**; Andrew Jackson – Tenet; Ged Wright – Sonic the Hedgehog; Greg Steele and Annemarie Griggs – Birds of Prey; Matt Kasmir, Chris Lawrence, David Watkins and Max Solomon – The Midnight Sky

== Special Honorary awards ==
- Breakthrough Performance by an Actor – Paul Raci for Sound of Metal
- Breakthrough Performance by an Actress – Cristin Milioti for Palm Springs
- Standout Performance by an Actor or Actress 23 or Under – Sidney Flanigan for Never Rarely Sometimes Always
- Impact Award – Judas and the Black Messiah
- Valiant Award – Zack Snyder
- Inspire Award – Lin-Manuel Miranda
- Game Changer Award – Nicole Beharie
- Timeless Award – Dante Spinotti
- Spotlight Award – Kiera Allen
- Star on the Rise Award – Jo Ellen Pellman
- Artisan on the Rise Award – Emile Mosseri
- Trailblazer Award – Dwayne Johnson
- Acting Achievement Award – Aubrey Plaza
- Artisan Achievement Award – Trent Reznor and Atticus Ross
- Filmmaker on the Rise Award – Emerald Fennell
- Filmmaking Achievement Award – Steve McQueen

== Films with multiple wins ==
Wins	Film
4	Promising Young Woman
2	Birds of Prey
2	Da 5 Bloods
2	The Invisible Man
2	Minari
2	Nomadland
2	Sound of Metal

== Films with multiple nominations ==
Nominations	Film
9	Promising Young Woman
8	One Night in Miami...
7	Ma Rainey's Black Bottom
7	Mank
6	Minari
6	Nomadland
6	Sound of Metal
5	Birds of Prey
5	Da 5 Bloods
5	Soul
4	The Invisible Man
4	The Father
4	The Prom
4	Tenet
4	The Trial of the Chicago 7
3	Judas and the Black Messiah
3	The Midnight Sky
3	Over the Moon
3	Palm Springs
3	The Personal History of David Copperfield
3	Sonic the Hedgehog
2	All In: The Fight for Democracy
2	Emma
2	Eurovision Song Contest: The Story of Fire Saga
2	First Cow
2	Hillbilly Elegy
2	Miss Juneteenth
2	News of the World
2	The Old Guard
2	On the Rocks
2	Pieces of a Woman
2	Wolfwalkers
2	Wonder Woman 1984
