= Jack Fincher (screenwriter) =

American screenwriter and journalist (1930–2003)

- Born: Howard Kelly Fincher; December 6, 1930; Bonham, Texas, U.S.
- Died: April 10, 2003 (aged 72); Los Angeles, California, U.S.
- Occupations: Journalist, screenwriter
- Spouse: Claire Boettcher (m. 1960)
- Children: 3, including David
- Relatives: Ceán Chaffin (daughter-in-law) Descendant of Frances Fincher The Immigrant, who arrived in America aboard the Bristol Comfort in 1683

Howard Kelly "Jack" Fincher (December 6, 1930 – April 10, 2003) was an American screenwriter and journalist who had written for various magazines and periodicals, notably as San Francisco bureau chief of Life magazine. He is the father of film director David Fincher.

== Life and work ==
Fincher was born in Bonham, Texas, the son of Grace Mae (Hutcheson) and Murlin Jackson Fincher, and was raised in Oklahoma. After graduating from high school in 1949, Fincher spent two years attending the University of Tulsa, also writing for the Tulsa World. He then enlisted in the United States Air Force. In 1960, he married Clara (Claire) Mae Boettcher (1932-2026), a mental health nurse from South Dakota who worked in drug addiction programs; their son is film director David Fincher. In 1964, when David was two, the family moved from Denver, Colorado, to San Anselmo, California, where filmmaker George Lucas was one of their neighbors.

Fincher once wrote a Howard Hughes biopic before his script was ultimately merged into the project that became The Aviator instead. He also wrote The Brain: Mystery of Matter and Mind. He wrote the screenplay for Fincher's Mank, a biographical film about screenwriter Herman J. Mankiewicz, which earned him posthumous nominations for the Golden Globe Award for Best Screenplay, and the BAFTA Award for Best Original Screenplay, 16 years after his death. Originally set to be filmed in the late 1990s, the script was not produced until his son David began filming in 2019. Starring Gary Oldman in the title role, the film was released by Netflix in 2020, to positive reception.

Jack Fincher died in Los Angeles on April 10, 2003, at the age of 72, following 2 years with pancreatic cancer.

== Credits ==
Film writer

- The Aviator (2004), uncredited
- Mank (2020), posthumous credit

Bibliography

- The Brain: Mystery of Matter and Mind (1981)

== Accolades ==
Award	Date of ceremony	Category	Film	Result	Ref.
AACTA Awards	March 6, 2021	Best International Screenplay	Mank	Nominated	
Alliance of Women Film Journalists Awards	January 4, 2021	Best Original Screenplay	Mank	Nominated	
British Academy Film Awards	April 11, 2021	Best Original Screenplay	Mank	Nominated	
Critics' Choice Awards	March 7, 2021	Best Original Screenplay	Mank	Nominated	
Florida Film Critics Circle Awards	December 21, 2020	Best Original Screenplay	Mank	Nominated	
Golden Globe Awards	February 28, 2021	Best Screenplay – Motion Picture	Mank	Nominated	
London Film Critics' Circle	February 7, 2021	Screenwriter of the Year	Mank	Nominated	
Satellite Awards	February 15, 2021	Best Original Screenplay	Mank	Nominated	
St. Louis Film Critics Association	January 17, 2021	Best Original Screenplay	Mank	Nominated	
