= 78th Golden Globe Awards =

Film award ceremony in 2021

- Official poster
- Date: February 28, 2021
- Site: The Rainbow Room, Manhattan, New York City, U.S. The Beverly Hilton, Beverly Hills, California, U.S.
- Hosted by: Tina Fey; Amy Poehler

Highlights
- Best Film: Drama: Nomadland
- Best Film: Musical or Comedy: Borat Subsequent Moviefilm
- Best Drama Series: The Crown
- Best Musical or Comedy Series: Schitt's Creek
- Best Miniseries or Television movie: The Queen's Gambit
- Most awards: The Crown (4)
- Most nominations: The Crown; Mank (6)

Television coverage
- Network: NBC
- Ratings: 6.9 million (Nielsen ratings)

The 78th Golden Globe Awards honored the best in American television of 2020, as well as film in 2020 and early 2021, as chosen by the Hollywood Foreign Press Association (HFPA). The ceremony took place on February 28, 2021, nearly two months later than normal, due to the impact of the COVID-19 pandemic on cinema and on television. Produced by Dick Clark Productions and the HFPA, and aired live on NBC in the United States, this was the first bi-coastal Golden Globes ceremony, with Tina Fey co-hosting from the Rainbow Room in New York City, and Amy Poehler co-hosting from The Beverly Hilton in Beverly Hills, California.

The nominees were announced on February 3, 2021. Jane Fonda and Norman Lear were announced as the recipients of the Cecil B. DeMille Award and the Carol Burnett Award, respectively.

With 4 wins, The Crown won the most at the ceremony, including Best TV Series – Drama. Schitt's Creek and The Queen's Gambit won 2 each, with the former winning Best TV Series – Musical or Comedy and the latter winning Best Miniseries or TV Film. In film, Borat Subsequent Moviefilm, Nomadland, and Soul won 2 each, with Nomadland winning Best Motion Picture – Drama and Borat winning Best Motion Picture – Musical or Comedy.

== Production ==
Tina Fey and Amy Poehler were announced as the hosts of the ceremony, for the fourth time, in January 2020, but for the very first time to co-host the Golden Globes bicoastally, both from Manhattan and from Beverly Hills, California. By June 2020, the HFPA decided to postpone the ceremony from its normal date in early January to February 28 due to both the impact of the COVID-19 pandemic on cinema and on television production. On February 2, 2021, it was reported that the ceremony would be held from both the Rainbow Room in New York City and the Golden Globes' usual home at The Beverly Hilton in Beverly Hills, California, allowing those on the East Coast to participate without having to make the cross-country trip. The nominees were announced on February 3, 2021.

== Timetable ==
- The eligibility period for motion pictures was extended to February 28, 2021.

== Winners and nominees ==
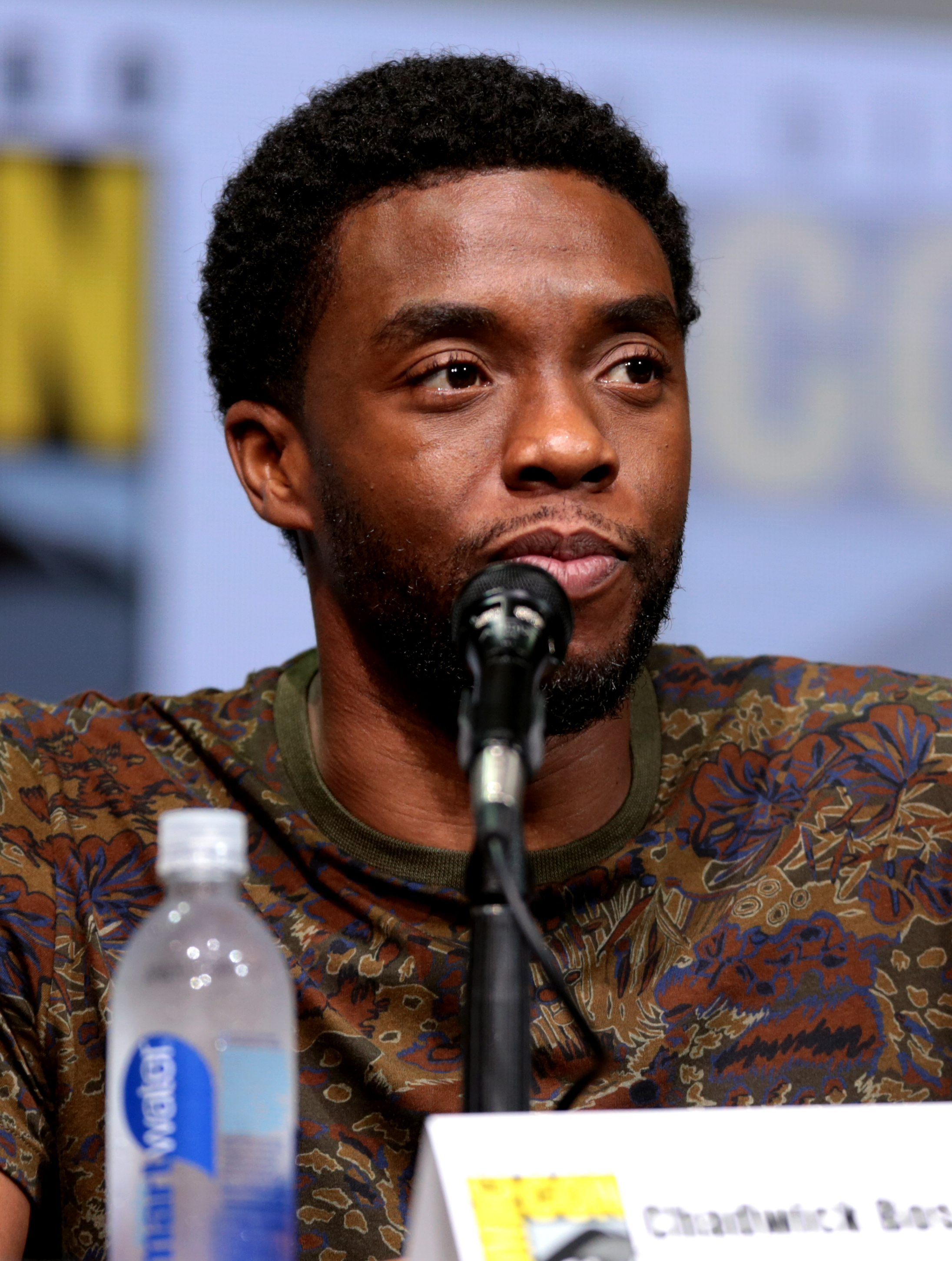
Chadwick Boseman, Best Actor in a Motion Picture – Drama winner

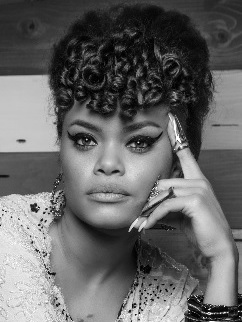
Andra Day, Best Actress in a Motion Picture – Drama winner

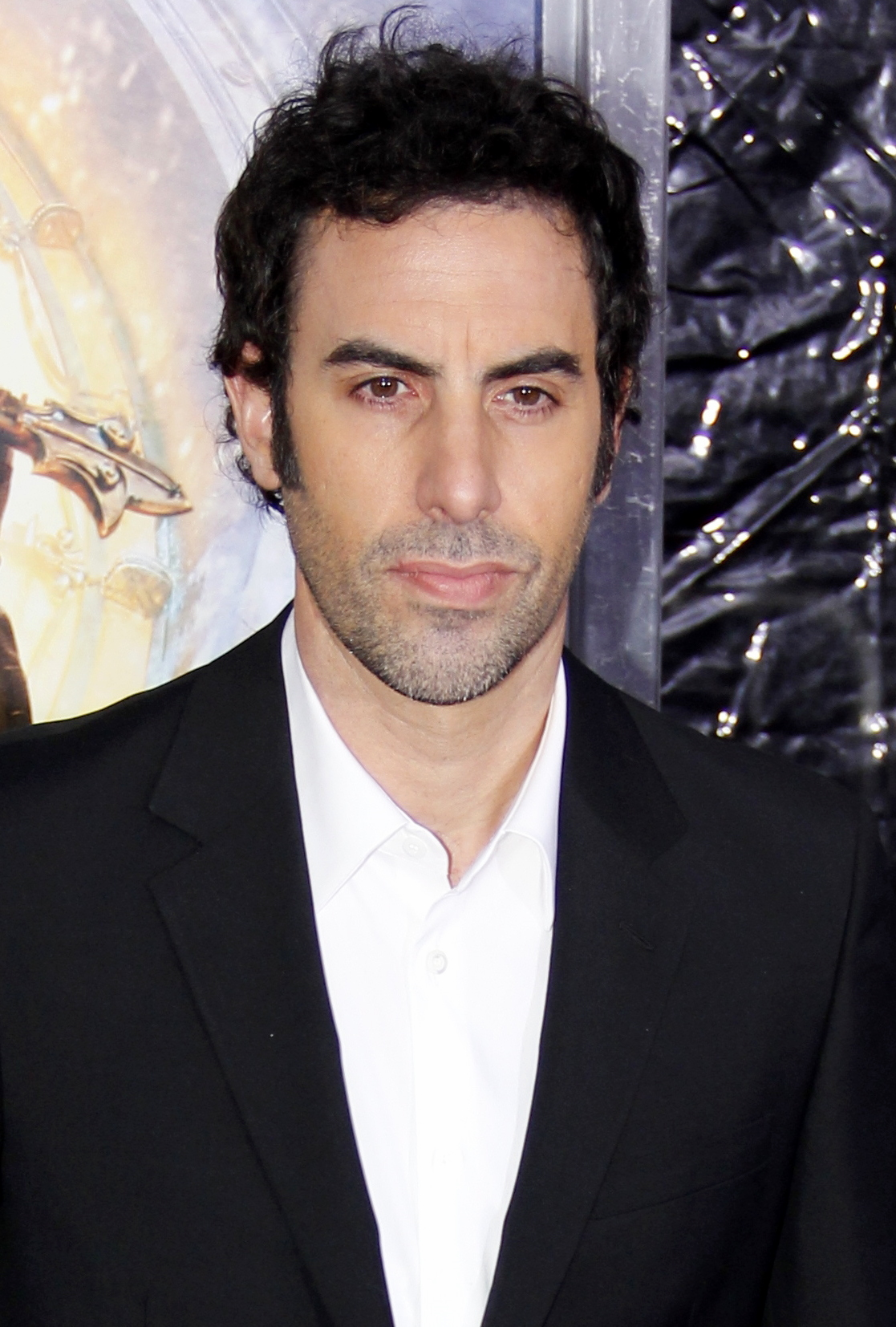
Sacha Baron Cohen, Best Actor in a Motion Picture – Musical or Comedy winner

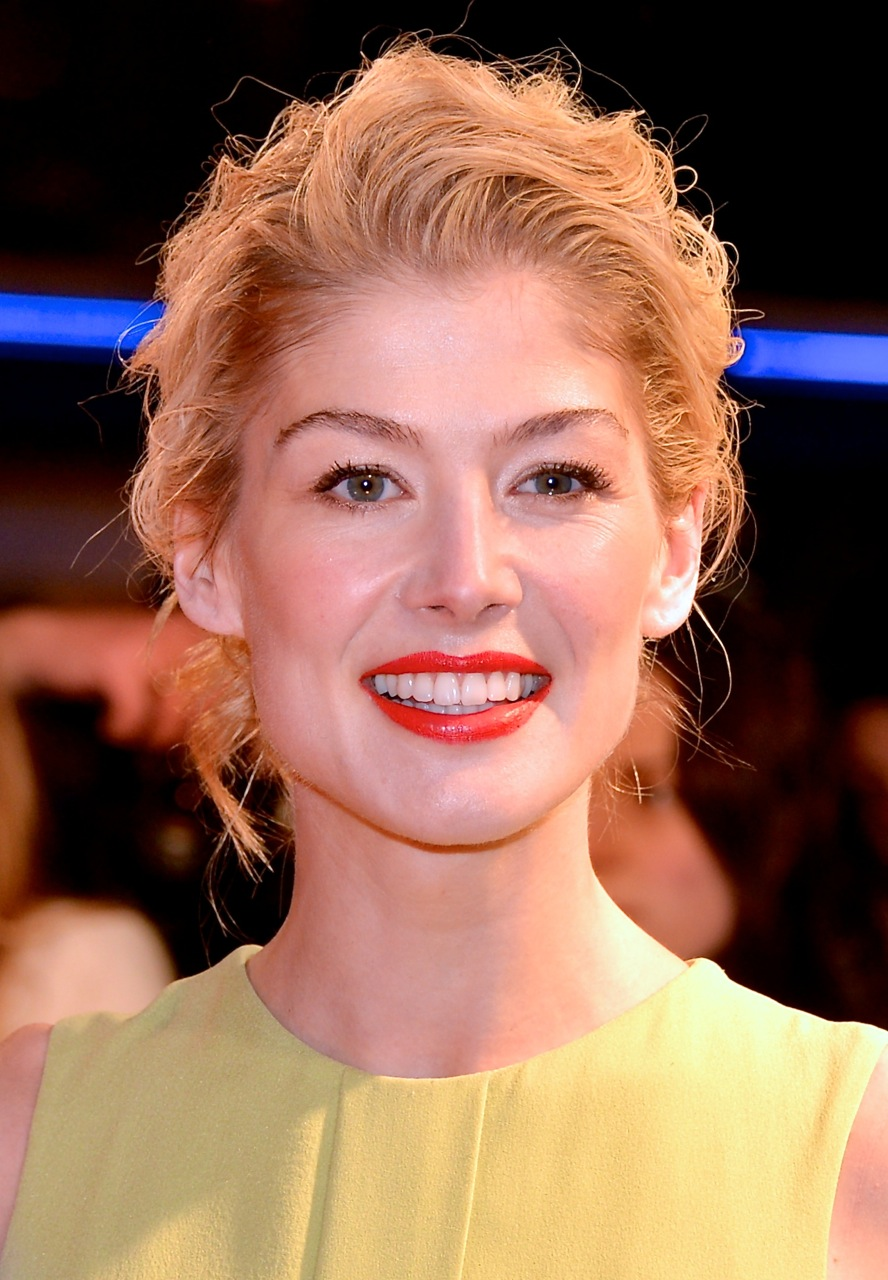
Rosamund Pike, Best Actress in a Motion Picture – Musical or Comedy winner

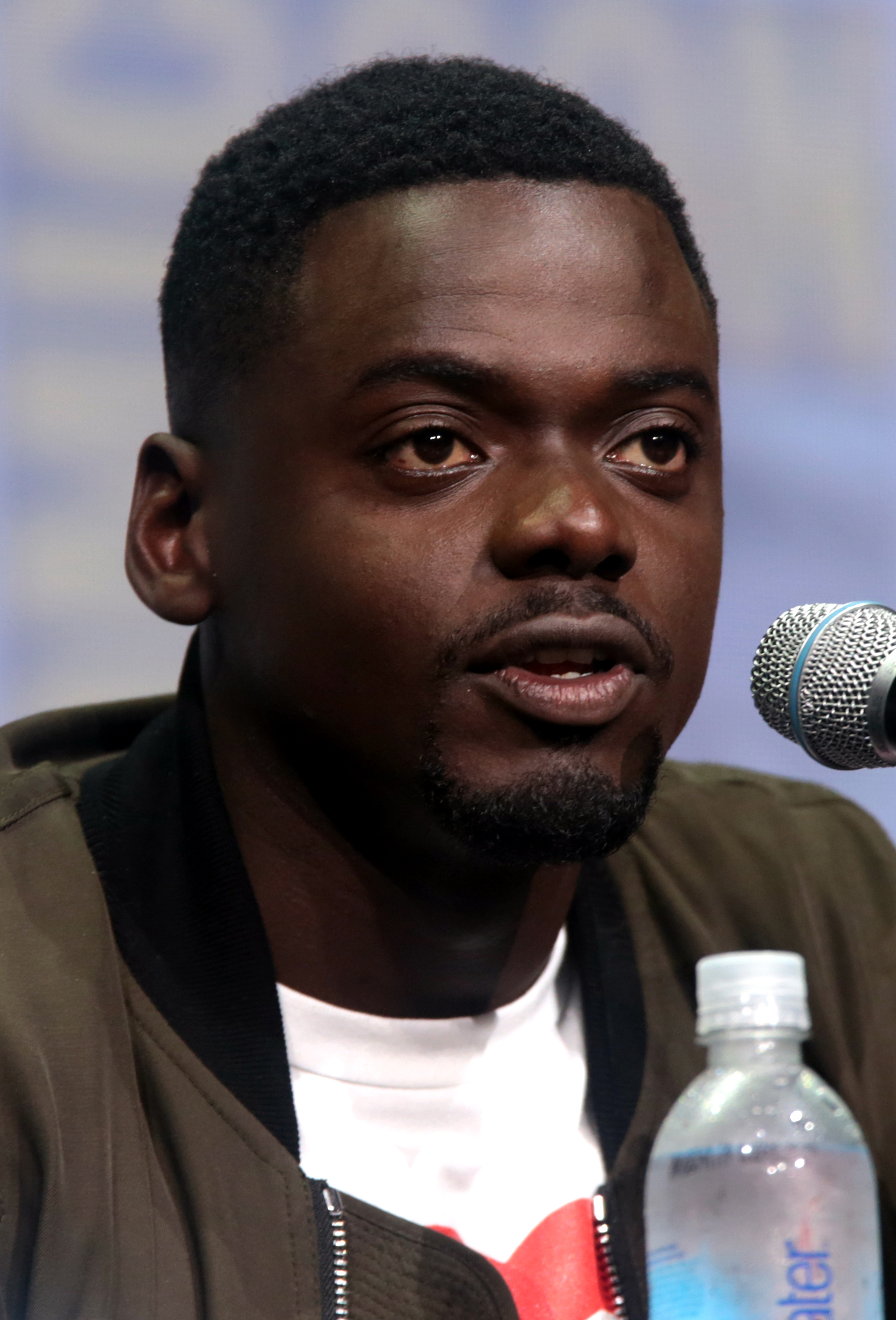
Daniel Kaluuya, Best Supporting Actor winner

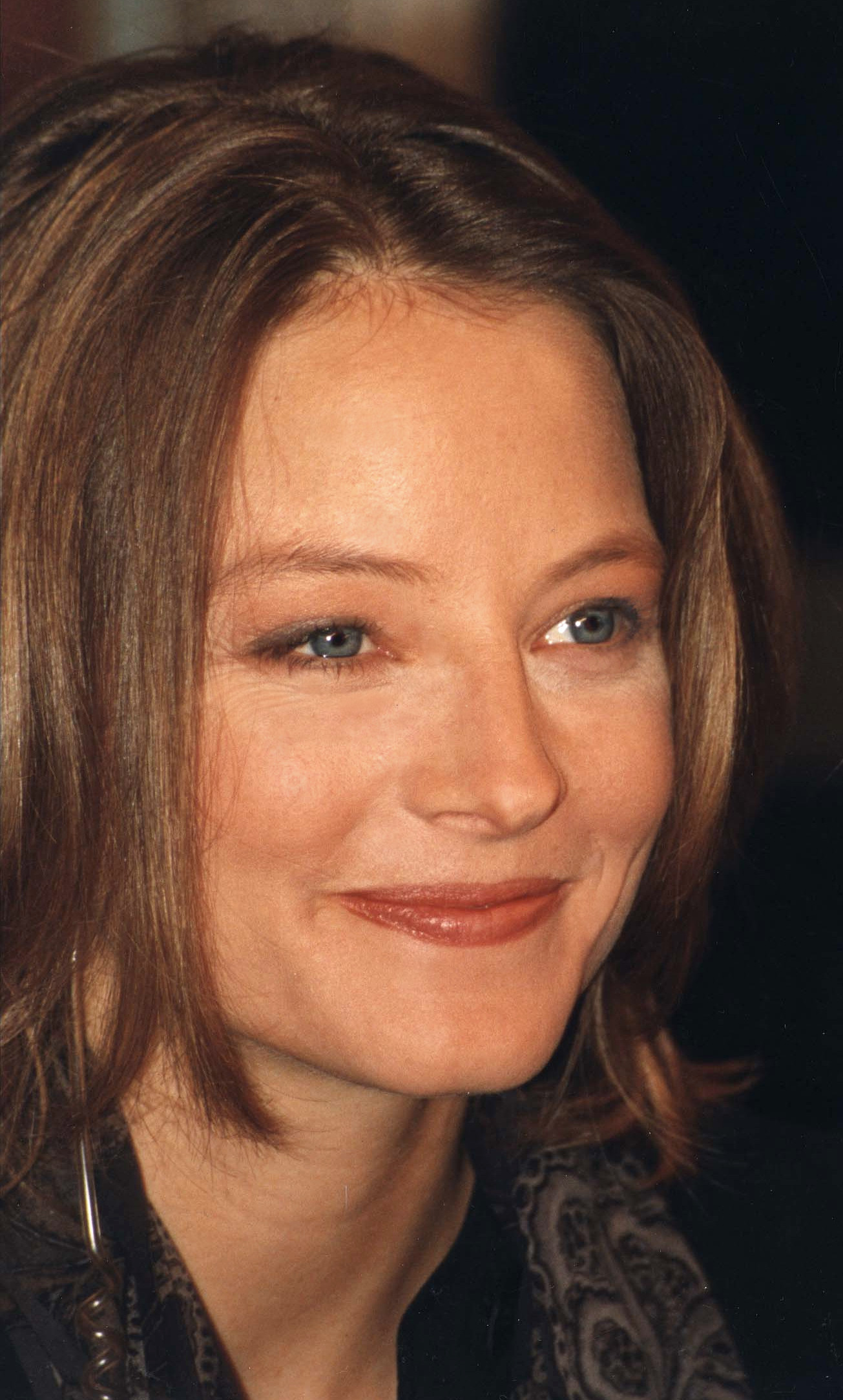
Jodie Foster, Best Supporting Actress winner

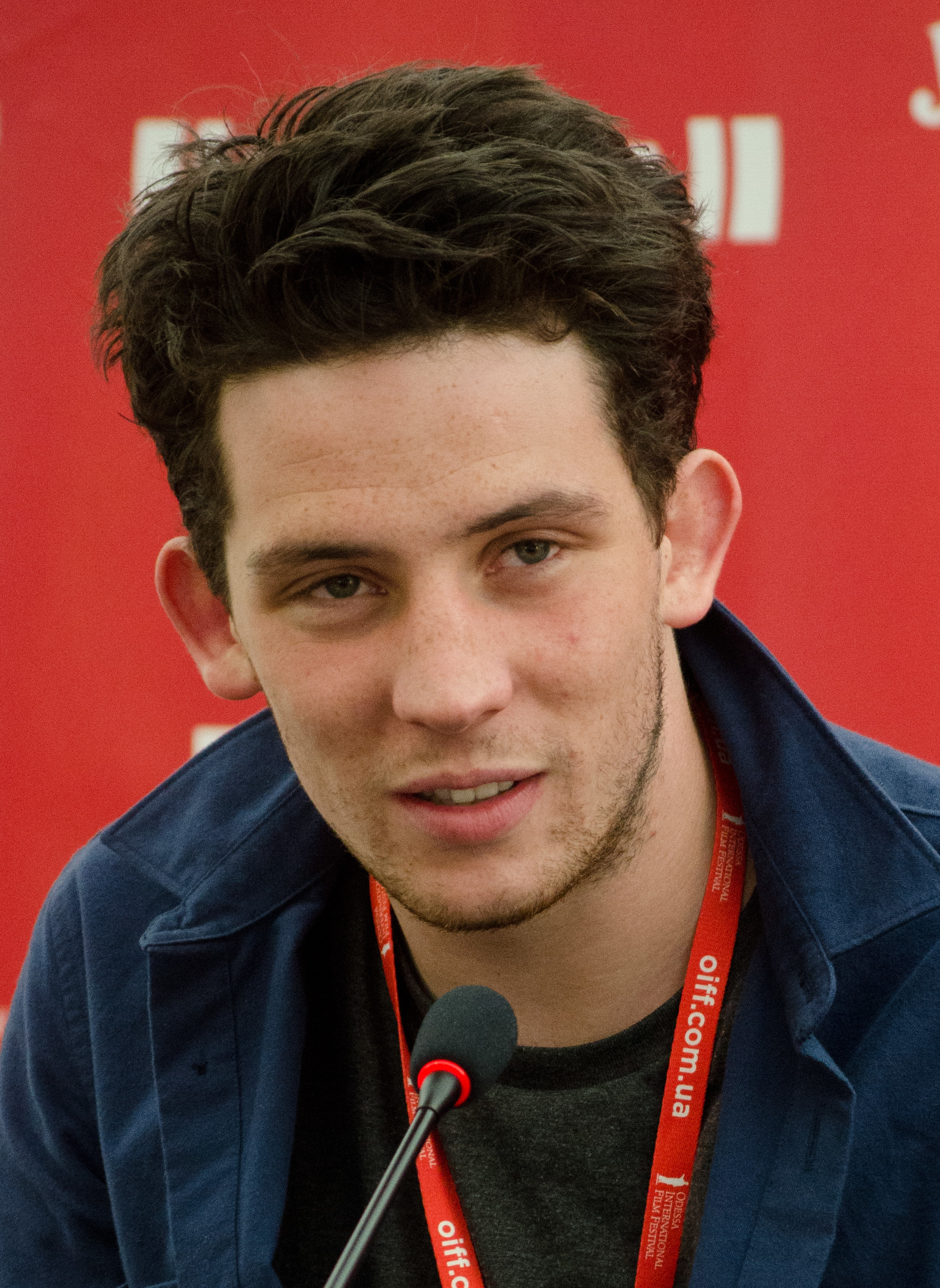
Josh O'Connor, Best Actor in a Television Series – Drama winner

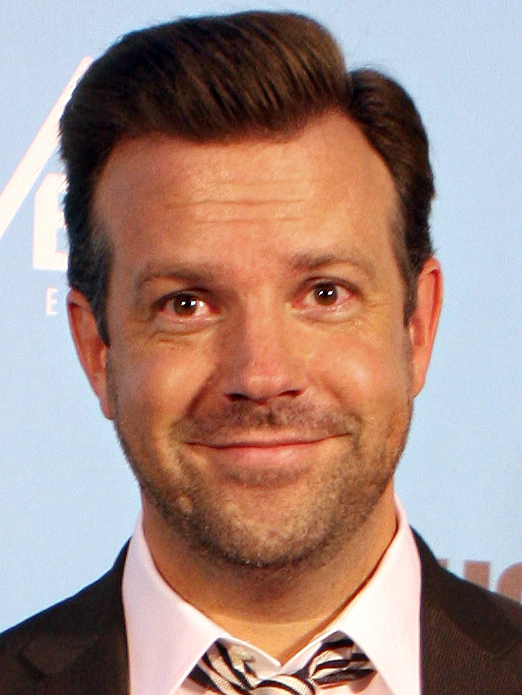
Jason Sudeikis, Best Actor in a Television Series – Musical or Comedy winner

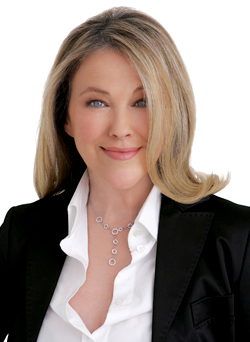
Catherine O'Hara, Best Actress in a Television Series – Musical or Comedy winner

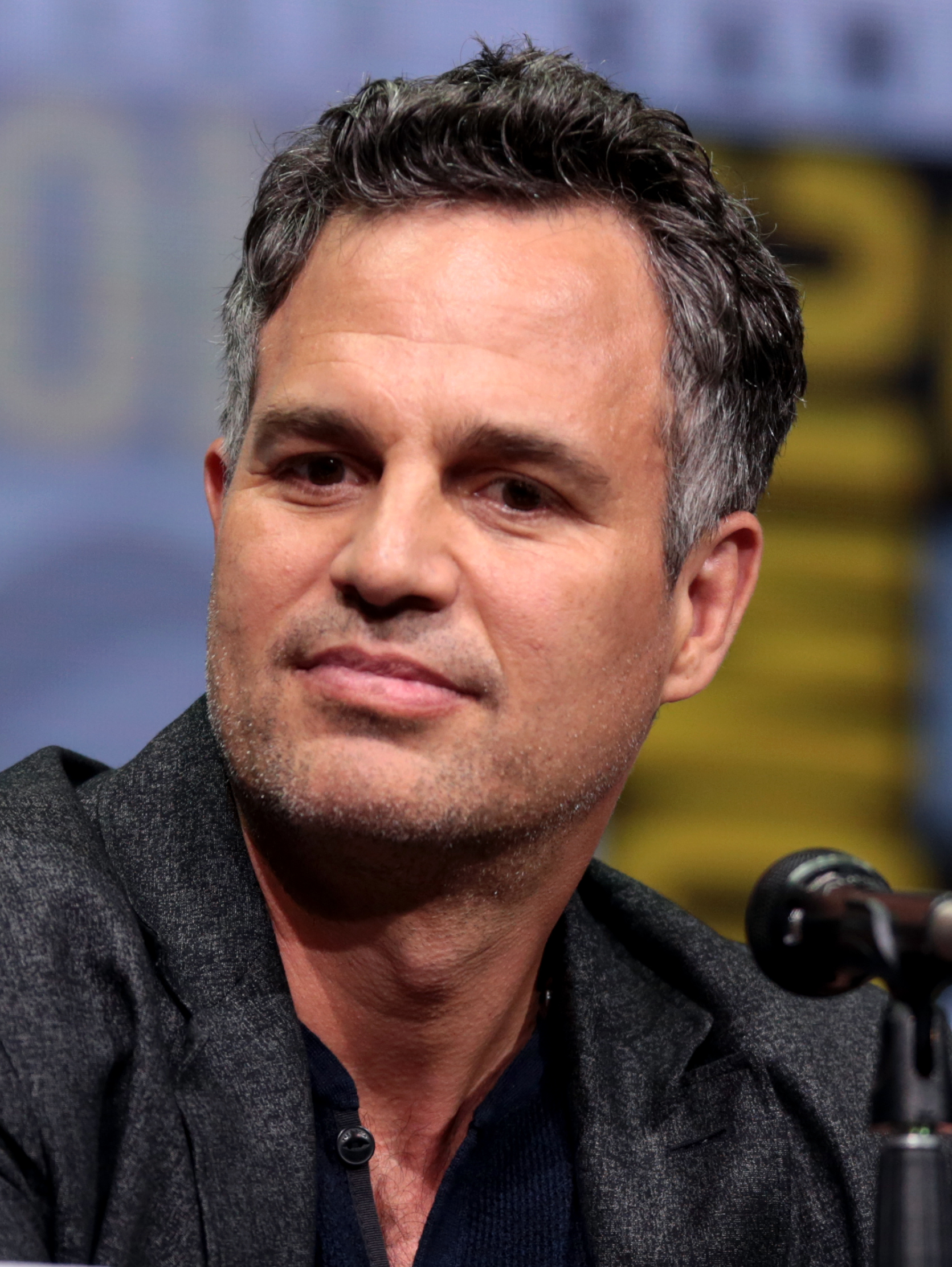
Mark Ruffalo, Best Actor in a Miniseries or Television Film winner

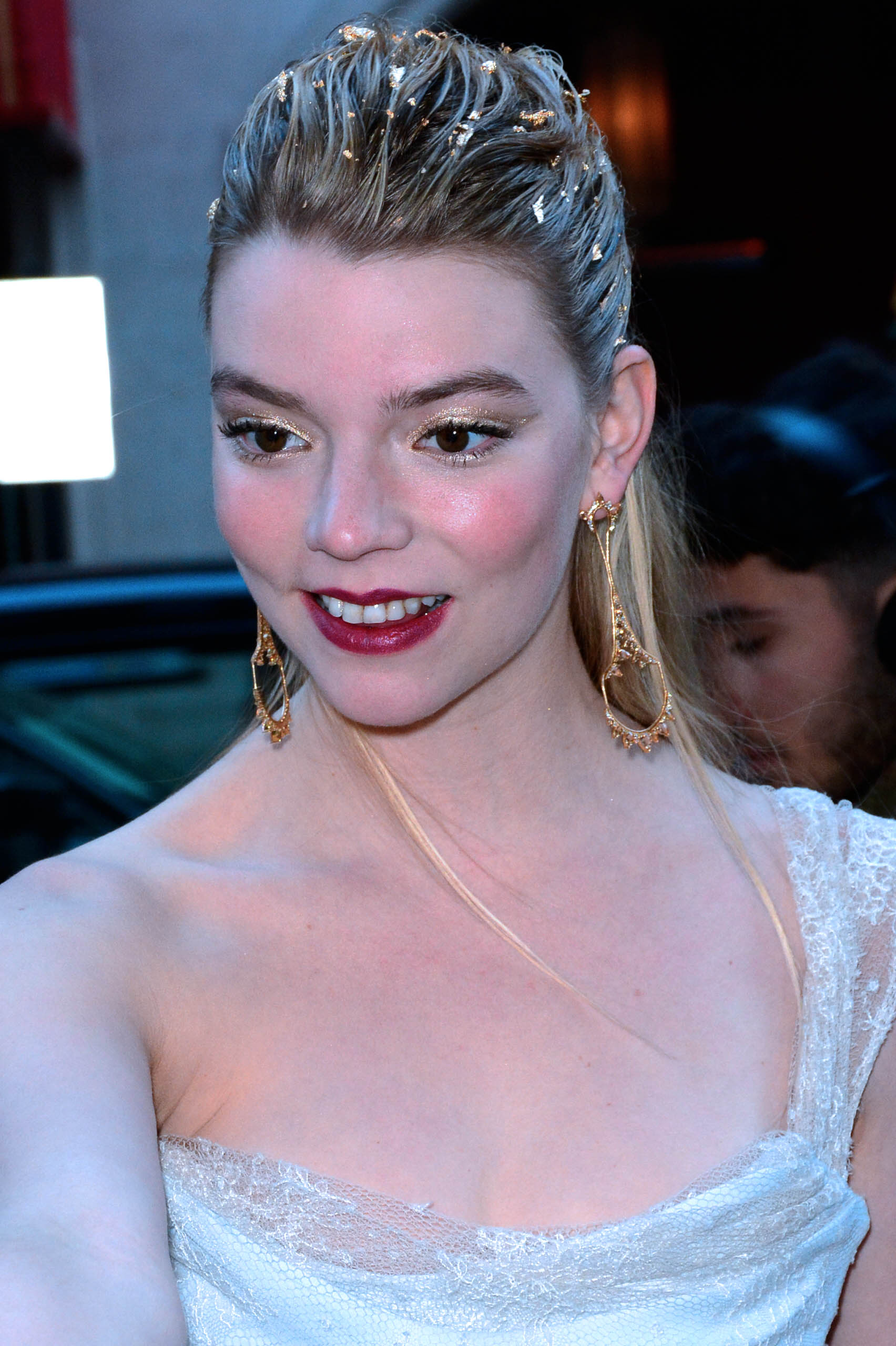
Anya Taylor-Joy, Best Actress in a Miniseries or Television Film winner

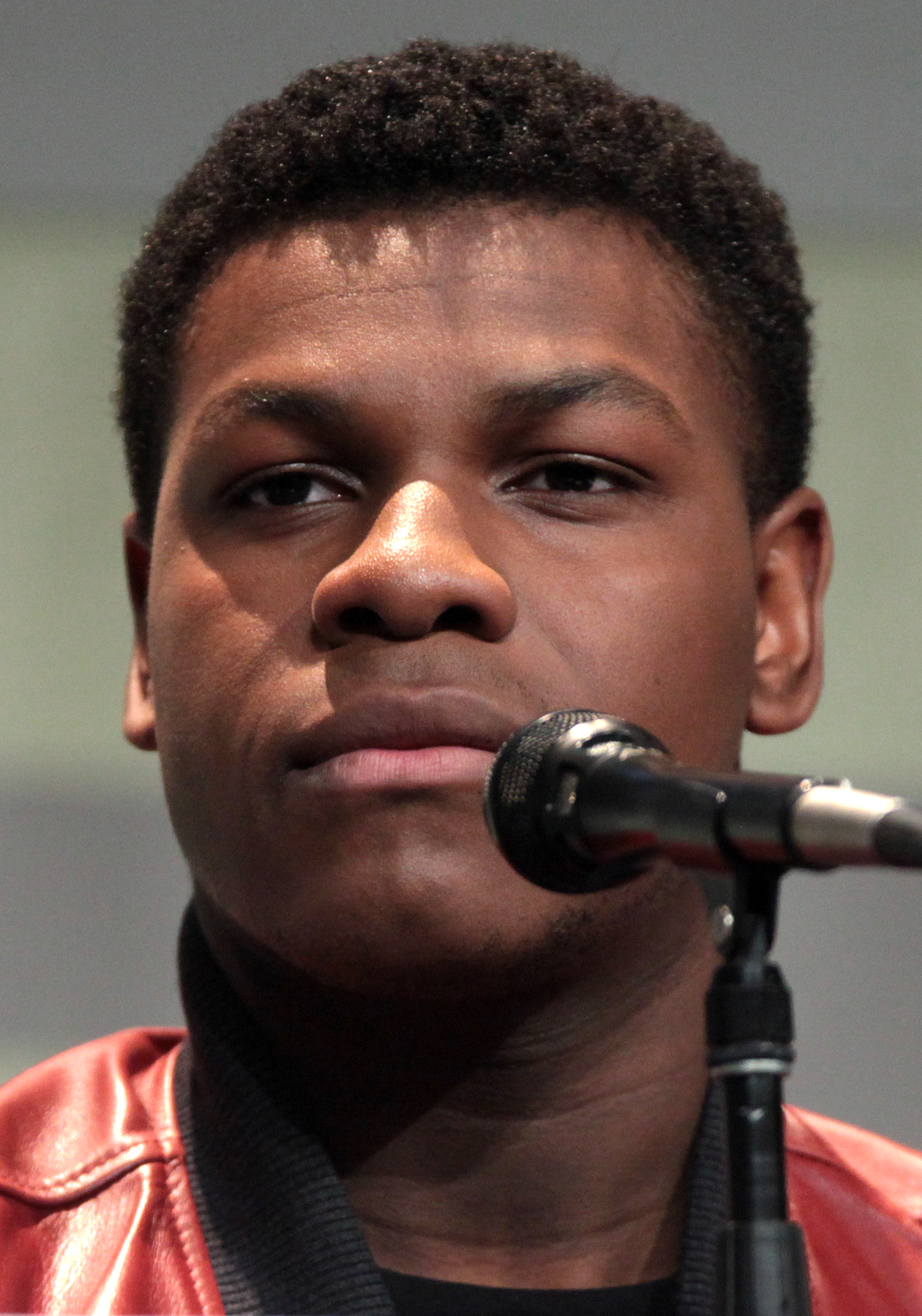
John Boyega, Best Supporting Actor in a Series, Miniseries, or Television Film winner

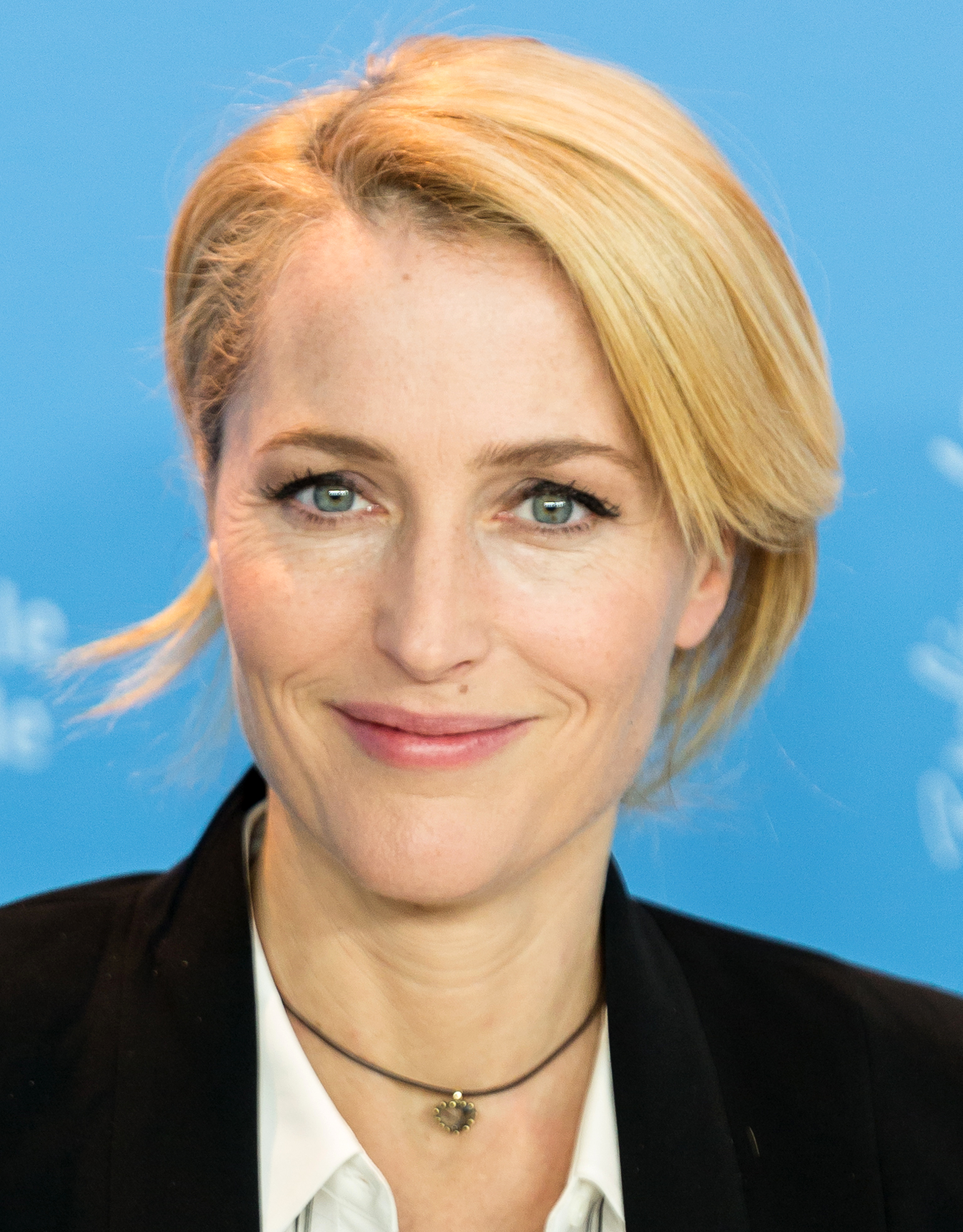
Gillian Anderson, Best Supporting Actress in a Series, Miniseries, or Television Film winner

=== Film ===
Key
| † | Indicates a posthumous nomination |

Best Motion Picture
| Drama | Musical or Comedy |
|---|---|
| Nomadland; The Father; Mank; Promising Young Woman; The Trial of the Chicago 7 | Borat Subsequent Moviefilm; Hamilton; Music; Palm Springs; The Prom |
Best Performance in a Motion Picture – Drama
| Actor | Actress |
| Chadwick Boseman † – Ma Rainey's Black Bottom as Levee Green; Riz Ahmed – Sound of Metal as Ruben Stone; Anthony Hopkins – The Father as Anthony; Gary Oldman – Mank as Herman J. Mankiewicz; Tahar Rahim – The Mauritanian as Mohamedou Ould Salahi | Andra Day – The United States vs. Billie Holiday as Billie Holiday; Viola Davis – Ma Rainey's Black Bottom as Ma Rainey; Vanessa Kirby – Pieces of a Woman as Martha Weiss; Frances McDormand – Nomadland as Fern; Carey Mulligan – Promising Young Woman as Cassandra "Cassie" Thomas |
Best Performance in a Motion Picture – Musical or Comedy
| Actor | Actress |
| Sacha Baron Cohen – Borat Subsequent Moviefilm as Borat Sagdiyev; James Corden – The Prom as Barry Glickman; Lin-Manuel Miranda – Hamilton as Alexander Hamilton; Dev Patel – The Personal History of David Copperfield as David Copperfield; Andy Samberg – Palm Springs as Nyles | Rosamund Pike – I Care a Lot as Marla Grayson; Maria Bakalova – Borat Subsequent Moviefilm as Tutar Sagdiyev; Kate Hudson – Music as Kazu "Zu" Gamble; Michelle Pfeiffer – French Exit as Frances Price; Anya Taylor-Joy – Emma as Emma Woodhouse |
Best Supporting Performance in a Motion Picture
| Supporting Actor | Supporting Actress |
| Daniel Kaluuya – Judas and the Black Messiah as Fred Hampton; Sacha Baron Cohen – The Trial of the Chicago 7 as Abbie Hoffman; Jared Leto – The Little Things as Albert Sparma; Bill Murray – On the Rocks as Felix Keane; Leslie Odom Jr. – One Night in Miami... as Sam Cooke | Jodie Foster – The Mauritanian as Nancy Hollander; Glenn Close – Hillbilly Elegy as Bonnie "Mamaw" Vance; Olivia Colman – The Father as Anne; Amanda Seyfried – Mank as Marion Davies; Helena Zengel – News of the World as Johanna Leonberger |
Other
| Best Director | Best Screenplay |
| Chloé Zhao – Nomadland; Emerald Fennell – Promising Young Woman; David Fincher – Mank; Regina King – One Night in Miami...; Aaron Sorkin – The Trial of the Chicago 7 | Aaron Sorkin – The Trial of the Chicago 7; Emerald Fennell – Promising Young Woman; Jack Fincher † – Mank; Christopher Hampton and Florian Zeller – The Father; Chloé Zhao – Nomadland |
| Best Original Score | Best Original Song |
| Jon Batiste, Trent Reznor, and Atticus Ross – Soul; Alexandre Desplat – The Midnight Sky; Ludwig Göransson – Tenet; James Newton Howard – News of the World; Trent Reznor and Atticus Ross – Mank | "Io sì (Seen)" (Niccolò Agliardi, Laura Pausini, and Diane Warren) – The Life Ahead; "Fight for You" (D'Mile, H.E.R., and Tiara Thomas) – Judas and the Black Messiah; "Hear My Voice" (Celeste and Daniel Pemberton) – The Trial of the Chicago 7; "Speak Now" (Sam Ashworth and Leslie Odom Jr.) – One Night in Miami...; "Tigress & Tweed" (Andra Day and Raphael Saadiq) – The United States vs. Billie Holiday |
| Best Animated Feature Film | Best Foreign Language Film |
| Soul; The Croods: A New Age; Onward; Over the Moon; Wolfwalkers | Minari (United States); Another Round (Denmark); La Llorona (Guatemala); The Life Ahead (Italy); Two of Us (France) |

=== Films with multiple nominations ===
The following films received multiple nominations:

| Nominations | Films |
|---|---|
| 6 | Mank |
| 5 | The Trial of the Chicago 7 |
| 4 | The Father |
| 4 | Nomadland |
| 4 | Promising Young Woman |
| 3 | Borat Subsequent Moviefilm |
| 3 | One Night in Miami... |
| 2 | Hamilton |
| 2 | Judas and the Black Messiah |
| 2 | The Life Ahead |
| 2 | Ma Rainey's Black Bottom |
| 2 | The Mauritanian |
| 2 | Music |
| 2 | News of the World |
| 2 | Palm Springs |
| 2 | The Prom |
| 2 | Soul |
| 2 | The United States vs. Billie Holiday |

=== Films with multiple wins ===
The following films received multiple wins:

| Wins | Films |
|---|---|
| 2 | Borat Subsequent Moviefilm |
| 2 | Nomadland |
| 2 | Soul |

=== Television ===
Best Television Series
| Drama | Musical or Comedy |
|---|---|
| The Crown (Netflix); Lovecraft Country (HBO); The Mandalorian (Disney+); Ozark (Netflix); Ratched (Netflix) | Schitt's Creek (Pop TV); Emily in Paris (Netflix); The Flight Attendant (HBO Max); The Great (Hulu); Ted Lasso (Apple TV+) |
Best Miniseries or Television Film
The Queen's Gambit (Netflix); Normal People (Hulu); Small Axe (Prime Video); The Undoing (HBO); Unorthodox (Netflix)
Best Performance in a Television Series – Drama
| Actor | Actress |
| Josh O'Connor – The Crown (Netflix) as Charles, Prince of Wales; Jason Bateman – Ozark (Netflix) as Martin "Marty" Byrde; Bob Odenkirk – Better Call Saul (AMC) as Saul Goodman; Al Pacino – Hunters (Amazon Prime Video) as Meyer Offerman; Matthew Rhys – Perry Mason (HBO) as Perry Mason | Emma Corrin – The Crown (Netflix) as Diana, Princess of Wales; Olivia Colman – The Crown (Netflix) as Queen Elizabeth II; Jodie Comer – Killing Eve (BBC America) as Villanelle; Laura Linney – Ozark (Netflix) as Wendy Byrde; Sarah Paulson – Ratched (Netflix) as Nurse Ratched |
Best Performance in a Television Series – Musical or Comedy
| Actor | Actress |
| Jason Sudeikis – Ted Lasso (Apple TV+) as Ted Lasso; Don Cheadle – Black Monday (Showtime) as Maurice Monroe; Nicholas Hoult – The Great (Hulu) as Peter III of Russia; Eugene Levy – Schitt's Creek (Pop TV) as Johnny Rose; Ramy Youssef – Ramy (Hulu) as Ramy Hassan | Catherine O'Hara – Schitt's Creek (Pop TV) as Moira Rose; Lily Collins – Emily in Paris (Netflix) as Emily Cooper; Kaley Cuoco – The Flight Attendant (HBO Max) as Cassie Bowden; Elle Fanning – The Great (Hulu) as Catherine the Great; Jane Levy – Zoey's Extraordinary Playlist (NBC) as Zoey Clarke |
Best Performance in a Miniseries or Television Film
| Actor | Actress |
| Mark Ruffalo – I Know This Much Is True (HBO) as Dominick and Thomas Birdsey; Bryan Cranston – Your Honor (Showtime) as Michael Desiato; Jeff Daniels – The Comey Rule (Showtime) as James Comey; Hugh Grant – The Undoing (HBO) as Jonathan Fraser; Ethan Hawke – The Good Lord Bird (Showtime) as John Brown | Anya Taylor-Joy – The Queen's Gambit (Netflix) as Beth Harmon; Cate Blanchett – Mrs. America (FX on Hulu) as Phyllis Schlafly; Daisy Edgar-Jones – Normal People (Hulu) as Marianne Sheridan; Shira Haas – Unorthodox (Netflix) as Esther "Esty" Shapiro; Nicole Kidman – The Undoing (HBO) as Grace Fraser |
Best Supporting Performance in a Series, Miniseries or Television Film
| Supporting Actor | Supporting Actress |
| John Boyega – Small Axe (Prime Video) as Leroy Logan; Brendan Gleeson – The Comey Rule (Showtime) as President Donald Trump; Dan Levy – Schitt's Creek (Pop TV) as David Rose; Jim Parsons – Hollywood (Netflix) as Henry Willson; Donald Sutherland – The Undoing (HBO) as Franklin Reinhardt | Gillian Anderson – The Crown (Netflix) as Margaret Thatcher; Helena Bonham Carter – The Crown (Netflix) as Princess Margaret; Julia Garner – Ozark (Netflix) as Ruth Langmore; Annie Murphy – Schitt's Creek (Pop TV) as Alexis Rose; Cynthia Nixon – Ratched (Netflix) as Gwendolyn Briggs |

=== Series with multiple nominations ===
The following television series received multiple nominations:

| Nominations | Series |
|---|---|
| 6 | The Crown |
| 5 | Schitt's Creek |
| 4 | Ozark |
| 4 | The Undoing |
| 3 | The Great |
| 3 | Ratched |
| 2 | The Comey Rule |
| 2 | Emily in Paris |
| 2 | The Flight Attendant |
| 2 | Normal People |
| 2 | The Queen's Gambit |
| 2 | Small Axe |
| 2 | Ted Lasso |
| 2 | Unorthodox |

=== Series with multiple wins ===
The following series received multiple wins:

| Wins | Series |
|---|---|
| 4 | The Crown |
| 2 | Schitt's Creek |
| 2 | The Queen's Gambit |

=== Cecil B. DeMille Award ===
The Cecil B. DeMille Award is an honorary award bestowed to honorees who have made a significant mark in the film industry. It is named after its first recipient, director Cecil B. DeMille.

- Jane Fonda

=== Carol Burnett Award ===
The Carol Burnett Award is an honorary award given for outstanding and lasting contributions to television on or off the screen. It is named in honor of its first recipient, actress Carol Burnett.

- Norman Lear

== Ceremony ==
=== Golden Globe Ambassadors ===
The Golden Globe Ambassadors are Jackson Lee and Satchel Lee, the son and daughter of Spike Lee and Tonya Lewis Lee.

=== Presenters ===
The following individuals presented awards at the ceremony:

- Laura Dern with Best Supporting Actor – Motion Picture
- Angela Bassett with Best Supporting Actor – Series, Miniseries or Television Film
- Colin Farrell introduced The Father
- Christian Slater (in New York City) with Best Actress – Television Series Musical or Comedy
- Tiffany Haddish with Best Animated Feature Film
- Yahya Abdul-Mateen II introduced The Trial of the Chicago 7
- Amanda Seyfried introduced Mank
- Justin Theroux (in New York City) with Best Actor – Miniseries or Television Film
- Cynthia Erivo with Best Screenplay
- Sarah Paulson introduced The Prom
- Tina Fey and Amy Poehler with the Carol Burnett Award and the Cecil B. DeMille Award
- Salma Hayek introduced Nomadland
- Kevin Bacon and Kyra Sedgwick with Best Actress – Television Series Drama
- Tracy Morgan (in New York City) with Best Original Song and Best Original Score
- Kate Hudson introduced Music
- Sterling K. Brown and Susan Kelechi Watson with Best Actor – Television Series Musical or Comedy and Best Television Series – Musical or Comedy
- Ben Stiller (in New York City) with Best Actress – Motion Picture Musical or Comedy
- Margot Robbie introduced Promising Young Woman
- Anthony Anderson with Best Actor – Television Series Drama
- Gal Gadot with Best Foreign Language Film
- Kenan Thompson with Best Television Series – Drama
- Ava DuVernay introduced Hamilton
- Jamie Lee Curtis with Best Supporting Actress – Motion Picture
- Christopher Meloni (in New York City) with Best Supporting Actress – Series, Miniseries or Television Film
- Jeanise Jones introduced Borat Subsequent Moviefilm
- Rosie Perez (in New York City) with Best Actress – Miniseries or Television Film and Best Miniseries or Television Film
- Renée Zellweger with Best Actor – Motion Picture Drama
- Bryce Dallas Howard (in New York City) with Best Director
- Sandra Oh introduced Palm Springs
- Annie Mumolo and Kristen Wiig with Best Motion Picture – Musical or Comedy
- Awkwafina with Best Actor – Motion Picture Musical or Comedy
- Joaquin Phoenix with Best Actress – Motion Picture Drama
- Michael Douglas and Catherine Zeta-Jones (in New York City) with Best Motion Picture – Drama

== Reception ==
=== Critical response ===
According to the review aggregator website Metacritic, which sampled 15 critic reviews and calculated a weighted average score of 35 out of 100, the ceremony received "generally unfavorable reviews". On Rotten Tomatoes, 10% of 21 critics have given the ceremony a positive review, with an average rating of 3.52/10. The critics consensus on the website reads: "Disappointingly dull and disturbingly lacking in self-awareness, The 78th Golden Globes ceremony wastes its menagerie of celebrities—and some well-deserved wins—on a stilted ceremony overshadowed by HFPA's questionable behind-the-scenes behavior."

=== Controversies ===
The ceremony received criticism regarding certain nominations. James Corden's nomination for Best Actor – Motion Picture Musical or Comedy (for his performance in The Prom) and the two nominations for Emily in Paris have faced controversy. The HFPA also drew criticism for the placement of Minari in the Best Foreign Language Film category, despite being an American film about a Korean-American family; it ultimately won. The determination that the film would be eligible for this category rather than Best Motion Picture – Drama, based on the Globes' rule that any film with over 50% of its dialogue not in English would be considered a Foreign Language Film, invited controversy. Lulu Wang, whose film The Farewell was subject to the same rule the previous year, wrote that "I have not seen a more American film than #Minari this year. It's a story about an immigrant family, IN America, pursuing the American dream. We really need to change these antiquated rules that characterize American as only English-speaking". Author Viet Thanh Nguyen wrote that the "decision speaks powerfully to the issue of what makes something — a language or a person or a culture — foreign". Many other filmmakers, actors, and authors, including Nia DaCosta, Daniel Dae Kim, Min Jin Lee, Franklin Leonard, Simu Liu, Phil Lord, Celeste Ng, Harry Shum Jr., and Phillipa Soo criticized the decision on similar grounds.

The nominations for the film Music also faced criticism for the casting of Maddie Ziegler as an autistic person, and concerns over what impact the film could have on the perception and handling of autistic people, with co-host Tina Fey joking that "Twitter is saying it's the most offensive casting since Kate Hudson was the Weightwatchers spokesperson". Hosts Fey and Amy Poehler also acknowledged the recent revelation that the HFPA has not had a single Black member for over twenty years.

=== Viewership ===
The ceremony received 6.9 million viewers in the United States, with a 1.5 Nielsen rating among adults 18 to 49, representing a 68% drop in viewership from the previous year's ceremony. It is the least viewed Golden Globe Awards telecast since the 65th Golden Globe Awards in 2008, which was solely a press conference due to the 2007–08 Writers Guild of America strike.
