= Ceán Chaffin =

American film producer (born 1957)

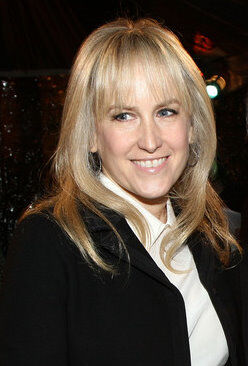
- Chaffin in 2021
- Born: June 26, 1957 (age 69); Los Angeles, California, U.S.
- Occupation: Film producer
- Spouse: David Fincher (m. 1996)
- Relatives: Jack Fincher (father-in-law)

Ceán Chaffin (born June 26, 1957) is an American film producer. She has won several American Film Institute awards and been nominated for multiple Academy Awards. Chaffin has frequently collaborated with her husband, director David Fincher.

== Filmography ==
- The Game (1997)
- Fight Club (1999)
- Panic Room (2002)
- Zodiac (2007)
- The Curious Case of Benjamin Button (2008)
- The Social Network (2010)
- The Girl with the Dragon Tattoo (2011)
- Gone Girl (2014)
- Mank (2020)
- The Killer (2023)
- The Further Mis-Adventures of Cliff Booth (2026)

In addition to producing the above films, Chaffin was executive producer for the 2017 television series Mindhunter.

== Accolades ==
She, along with her fellow producers, was nominated for the Academy Award for Best Picture for The Curious Case of Benjamin Button (2008), The Social Network (2010), and Mank (2020). Chaffin was nominated for Producers Guild of America Award for Best Theatrical Motion Picture and won American Film Institute's AFI Awards for the three aforementioned films as well as for The Girl with the Dragon Tattoo (2011). She received two nominations for the BAFTA Award for Best Film for The Curious Case of Benjamin Button and The Social Network.
