= 10th AACTA International Awards =

Australian film and TV awards ceremony in 2021

- Date: 5 March 2021

Highlights
- Best Film: Promising Young Woman
- Most awards: Promising Young Woman, The Queen's Gambit, and The Trial of the Chicago 7 (2)
- Most nominations: Nomadland (6)

The 10th Australian Academy of Cinema and Television Arts International Awards, commonly known as the AACTA International Awards, is presented by the Australian Academy of Cinema and Television Arts (AACTA), a non-profit organisation whose aim is to identify, award, promote and celebrate Australia's greatest achievements in film and television. Awards were handed out for the best films of 2020 regardless of the country of origin, and are the international counterpart to the awards for Australian films.

Nominations were announced on 12 February 2021. The categories were also expanded to recognize television productions with four categories: Best Comedy Series, Best Drama Series, Best Actor in a Series, and Best Actress in a Series. Winners were announced on 5 March 2021.

== Winners and nominees ==
=== Film ===
Best Film: Promising Young Woman; The Father; Minari; Nomadland; The Trial of the Chicago 7	Best Direction: Chloé Zhao – Nomadland; Pete Docter – Soul; Emerald Fennell – Promising Young Woman; David Fincher – Mank; Aaron Sorkin – The Trial of the Chicago 7
Best Actor: Chadwick Boseman – Ma Rainey's Black Bottom as Levee Green; Riz Ahmed – Sound of Metal as Ruben Stone; Adarsh Gourav – The White Tiger as Balram Halwai; Anthony Hopkins – The Father as Anthony; Gary Oldman – Mank as Herman J. Mankiewicz	Best Actress: Carey Mulligan – Promising Young Woman as Cassandra "Cassie" Thomas; Viola Davis – Ma Rainey's Black Bottom as Ma Rainey; Vanessa Kirby – Pieces of a Woman as Martha Weiss; Frances McDormand – Nomadland as Fern; Eliza Scanlen – Babyteeth as Milla Finlay
Best Supporting Actor: Sacha Baron Cohen – The Trial of the Chicago 7 as Abbie Hoffman; Chadwick Boseman – Da 5 Bloods as "Stormin'" Norman Earl Holloway; Ben Mendelsohn – Babyteeth as Henry Finlay; Mark Rylance – The Trial of the Chicago 7 as William Kunstler; David Strathairn – Nomadland as David	Best Supporting Actress: Olivia Colman – The Father as Anne; Maria Bakalova – Borat Subsequent Moviefilm as Tutar Sagdiyev; Saoirse Ronan – Ammonite as Charlotte Murchison; Amanda Seyfried – Mank as Marion Davies; Swankie – Nomadland as Swankie
Best Screenplay: Aaron Sorkin – The Trial of the Chicago 7; Christopher Hampton and Florian Zeller – The Father; Jack Fincher – Mank; Chloé Zhao – Nomadland; Emerald Fennell – Promising Young Woman

=== Television ===
Best Comedy Series: Schitt's Creek; After Life; The Great; Sex Education; What We Do in the Shadows	Best Drama Series: The Queen's Gambit; The Crown; I May Destroy You; The Mandalorian; Mystery Road
Best Actor in a Series: Aaron Pedersen – Mystery Road as Jay Swan; Jason Bateman – Ozark as Marty Byrde; Hugh Grant – The Undoing as Jonathan Fraser; Daniel Levy – Schitt's Creek as David Rose; Paul Mescal – Normal People as Connell Waldron	Best Actress in a Series: Anya Taylor-Joy – The Queen's Gambit as Beth Harmon; Cate Blanchett – Mrs. America as Phyllis Schlafly; Daisy Edgar-Jones – Normal People as Marianne Sheridan; Nicole Kidman – The Undoing as Grace Fraser; Catherine O'Hara – Schitt's Creek as Moira Rose
