= Jamika Wilson =

American make-up artist

- Occupation: Make-up artist

Jamika Wilson is an American make-up artist. She won an Academy Award in the category Best Makeup and Hairstyling for the film Ma Rainey's Black Bottom.

== Selected filmography ==
- Ma Rainey's Black Bottom (2020; co-won with Sergio López-Rivera and Mia Neal)
