= Mia Neal =

American make-up artist

- Occupation: Hair stylist

Mia Neal is an American hair stylist. She won an Academy Award in the category Best Makeup and Hairstyling for the film Ma Rainey's Black Bottom.

== Selected filmography ==
- Ma Rainey's Black Bottom (2020; co-won with Sergio López-Rivera and Jamika Wilson)
