= Kimberley Spiteri =

American make-up artist

- Occupation: Make-up artist

Kimberley Spiteri is an American make-up artist. She was nominated for an Academy Award in the category Best Makeup and Hairstyling for the film Mank. Spiteri also won an Primetime Emmy Award and was nominated for five more in the category Outstanding Hairstyling for her work on the television programs Six Feet Under, The Originals, The Marvelous Mrs. Maisel and television films Ike: Countdown to D-Day and Deadwood: The Movie.

== Selected filmography ==
- Mank (2020; co-nominated with Gigi Williams and Colleen LaBaff)
