= Colleen LaBaff =

American make-up artist

- Occupation: Make-up artist

Colleen LaBaff (born c.1962) is an American make-up artist. She was nominated for an Academy Award in the category Best Makeup and Hairstyling for the film Mank. She is from Port Charlotte, Florida.

== Selected filmography ==
- Mank (2020; co-nominated with Gigi Williams and Kimberley Spiteri)
