= Mank =

2020 film by David Fincher

- Official release poster
- Directed by: David Fincher
- Screenplay by: Jack Fincher
- Produced by: Ceán Chaffin; Eric Roth; Douglas Urbanski
- Starring: Gary Oldman; Amanda Seyfried; Lily Collins; Arliss Howard; Tom Pelphrey; Charles Dance; Tom Burke
- Cinematography: Erik Messerschmidt
- Edited by: Kirk Baxter
- Music by: Trent Reznor; Atticus Ross
- Production companies: Netflix International Pictures; Flying Studio Pictures; Panic Pictures; Blue Light
- Distributed by: Netflix
- Release dates: November 13, 2020 (United States); December 4, 2020 (Netflix)
- Running time: 131 minutes
- Country: United States
- Language: English
- Budget: $25 million
- Box office: $122,572

Mank is a 2020 American biographical drama film about screenwriter Herman J. Mankiewicz and his development of the screenplay for Orson Welles's 1941 film Citizen Kane. It was directed by David Fincher based on a screenplay written by his late father Jack Fincher and was produced by Ceán Chaffin, Douglas Urbanski, and Eric Roth. It stars Gary Oldman in the title role, alongside Amanda Seyfried, Lily Collins, Arliss Howard, Tom Pelphrey, Sam Troughton, Ferdinand Kingsley, Tuppence Middleton, Tom Burke, Joseph Cross, Jamie McShane, Toby Leonard Moore, Monika Gossman, and Charles Dance.

Fincher originally intended to make Mank after he completed The Game (1997), with Kevin Spacey and Jodie Foster as the leads, but the project did not come to fruition. Eventually, the project was officially announced in July 2019, and filming took place around Los Angeles from November 2019 to February 2020. To pay homage to the films of the 1930s, Mank was shot in black-and-white, using RED cameras.

Mank had a limited theatrical release on November 13, 2020, and began streaming on Netflix on December 4. The film received positive reviews from critics, who praised Fincher's direction, as well as the acting (particularly Oldman and Seyfried), cinematography, production values, and musical score. The film earned the leading 10 nominations at the 93rd Academy Awards, including Best Picture, Best Director, Best Actor (Oldman), and Best Supporting Actress (Seyfried), and won for Best Production Design and Best Cinematography. It received the leading six nominations at the 78th Golden Globe Awards, including Best Motion Picture – Drama as well as the six nominations at the 74th British Academy Film Awards.

== Plot ==
In 1940, Orson Welles is given complete creative freedom for his next project by RKO. For the screenplay, Welles recruits Herman J. Mankiewicz, who is in Victorville, California, recovering from a broken leg he sustained in a car crash. Herman dictates the script to his secretary, Rita Alexander, who notices similarities between the main character (Charles Foster Kane) and William Randolph Hearst. Producer John Houseman is concerned about Herman's dense, nonlinear screenplay, while Herman's brother Joseph worries that it may anger the powerful Hearst.

In 1930, Herman visits an MGM location where he and the female lead, Marion Davies, recognize each other. She introduces him to Hearst, her benefactor and lover, who takes a liking to Herman. In 1933, Herman and his wife Sara attend Louis B. Mayer's birthday party at Hearst Castle with many Hollywood bigwigs. They discuss the rise of Nazi Germany and the upcoming gubernatorial election, in particular the Democratic candidate Upton Sinclair. Herman and Marion go for a stroll, where they bond over discussions on politics and the film industry.

In 1940, Houseman grows impatient over Herman's lack of progress. Rita is also concerned with the timing of the writing and Herman's alcoholism. He finishes the screenplay in time. Houseman is impressed but reminds Herman that he will receive no credit for his work.

In 1934, Herman and Joseph begin working at MGM under Mayer. Studio executives, including Irving Thalberg, actively work against Sinclair's gubernatorial campaign. The studio produces propaganda films for a smear campaign, funded by Hearst, against Sinclair (the films were an ironic suggestion by Herman after a discussion on why he wouldn't publicly endorse Frank Merriam, Sinclair's Republican opponent in unity with Mayer and the studio's brass). Herman approaches Marion to pull the films but is unsuccessful as she has already left the studio for Warner Bros. Herman and Sara later attend an election night watch party at the Trocadero Nightclub, where Mayer announces the winner, Frank Merriam. Herman's colleague, director Shelly Metcalf, shoots and kills himself after being diagnosed with Parkinson's disease and guilt-ridden about the role he played in the smear campaign (he personally supported Sinclair).

In 1940, Charles Lederer picks up the screenplay from Herman to deliver to the studio. Joseph visits Herman after reading it, warning him of Hearst's reaction and how it might affect Marion. He does, however, believe that it is the finest thing Herman has ever written. Marion also visits and does her best to persuade Herman to change the screenplay but to no avail. She tells Herman she will try to stop the picture from getting made.

In 1937, Herman crashes a party at Hearst Castle, where he drunkenly attacks Hearst for not supporting Sinclair as Sinclair supported Hearst as a champion of Socialism in his youth as a budding newspaper magnate. Offending everyone present, including Hearst, Mayer, and Marion, an enraged Mayer reveals that Herman is on Hearst's payroll and calls him a court jester. Hearst tells him an allegory about a monkey and an organ grinder and sees him out.

In 1940, despite pressure from Hearst, Welles is determined to make the film and intends to do a re-write without Herman. He visits Herman and offers him a buyout from the studio. However, reneging on the terms of his contract and with the Screen Writers Guild having been recently revived, Herman requests credit for the script, declaring it his greatest work. An upset Welles tells Herman that he has gone to bat for him before leaving angrily. Herman ultimately receives joint credit with Welles, and they win the Academy Award for Best Original Screenplay for the film (Citizen Kane) two years later.

== Cast ==
- Gary Oldman as Herman J. Mankiewicz
- Amanda Seyfried as Marion Davies
- Lily Collins as Rita Alexander, Herman's secretary, from whom another character, Susan Alexander Kane, gets her name.
- Arliss Howard as Louis B. Mayer
- Tom Pelphrey as Joseph L. Mankiewicz
- Charles Dance as William Randolph Hearst
- Sam Troughton as John Houseman
- Ferdinand Kingsley as Irving Thalberg
- Tuppence Middleton as Sara Mankiewicz
- Tom Burke as Orson Welles
- Joseph Cross as Charles Lederer
- Jamie McShane as "Shelly Metcalf", test shot director and Herman's friend. Although Metcalf is fictional, Felix E. Feist was the test shot director at MGM, who shot the propaganda films against Upton Sinclair that Metcalf shoots in Mank.
- Toby Leonard Moore as David O. Selznick
- Monika Gossmann as Fräulein Frieda, Herman's housekeeper
- Leven Rambin as Eve Metcalf, Shelly's wife (fictional character)
- Bill Nye as Upton Sinclair
- Jeff Harms as Ben Hecht
- Craig Robert Young as Charlie Chaplin
- Randy Davison as Maitre d'

Many other Hollywood icons are portrayed, including Dolores del Río, George S. Kaufman, Lionel Barrymore, Greta Garbo, Josef von Sternberg, Norma Shearer, Eleanor Boardman, Joan Crawford, Geraldine Fitzgerald, Billie Dove, Rexford Tugwell, Bette Davis, Clark Gable, Charles MacArthur, Darryl F. Zanuck, S. J. Perelman, Carole Lombard, and Eddie Cantor.

== Production ==
Mank official logo

=== Development ===
Mank was officially announced in July 2019 when David Fincher said he would direct the film, with Gary Oldman set to star. The screenplay was written by Fincher's father, Jack Fincher, before his death in 2003. It was originally going to be Fincher's follow-up to The Game (1997) with Kevin Spacey and Jodie Foster set to star but never came to fruition due to Fincher's insistence on shooting in black-and-white. Additional casting was announced in October, with Amanda Seyfried, Lily Collins, Tuppence Middleton, Arliss Howard, and Charles Dance among the new cast added.

Fincher reunites with much of his usual filmmaking team, including production designer Donald Graham Burt, editor Kirk Baxter, and composers Trent Reznor and Atticus Ross, using only period-authentic instruments. Fincher opted for cinematographer Erik Messerschmidt, with whom he worked on his series Mindhunter.

=== Writing ===
The 120-page draft of the initial script revealed that Jack Fincher closely followed a claim voiced by Pauline Kael in her 1971 New Yorker article "Raising Kane" that Welles did not deserve screenwriting credit. The article angered many critics, including Welles's friend and fellow filmmaker Peter Bogdanovich who rebutted Kael's claims point by point in "The Kane Mutiny", an October 1972 article for Esquire. Her argument was discredited by several film scholars through the years, including Robert L. Carringer in his study of "The Scripts of Citizen Kane."

Many current academics and critics were sparked to action by Mank's many-times over debunked premise that the script was Mankiewicz's alone, including New York Times writer Ben Kenigsberg, and Jonathan Rosenbaum, editor of the Welles-Bogdanovich book This Is Orson Welles, who wrote "Finchers Senior and Junior, willing and eager to accept and further spread Kael's inaccurate assertion that Herman J. Mankiewicz was the only screenwriter on Citizen Kane, not bothering to research the matter."

Mank producer Eric Roth reportedly polished the script before filming, with David Fincher saying he felt early drafts were too anti-Welles. When asked about the controversy surrounding authorship, Fincher stated that his movie does not aim to settle the issue: "It was not my interest to make a movie about a posthumous credit arbitration. I was interested in making a movie about a man who agreed not to take any credit. And who then changed his mind. That was interesting to me."

=== Filming ===
Filming began on November 1, 2019 in Los Angeles. It also took place in Victorville, California, and wrapped on February 4, 2020. The film was shot in black and white on Fincher's preferred RED digital camera and made reference to the aesthetics of Citizen Kane cinematographer Gregg Toland. Dance stated that a scene involving a drunken Mankiewicz took over 100 takes, while Seyfried said that one of her scenes took over a week and 200 takes to shoot. She stated, "It does feel like Groundhog Day, in a way, but that's how [Fincher] captures things that most people don't." The moonlight stroll between Mankiewicz and Davies was filmed at Huntington Gardens and a Pasadena mansion during the day, but it takes place at night. This was done using the day for night technique. Shooting it during the day was necessary for the lighting Messerschmidt needed for the scene.

=== Costume design ===
For designing the costumes, costume designer Trish Summerville and production designer Donald Graham Burt used the noir and monochromatic filters on their iPhones to see how they would look in black and white. Because the film was shot in black and white and not converted, it meant Summerville had to pick colors that would pop. She looked at photos from 1930s Hollywood to see what was worn at the time.

=== Music ===
Fincher's frequent collaborators Trent Reznor and Atticus Ross composed the score for Mank. Forgoing their usual synth-heavy style, Reznor and Ross used period-authentic instrumentation from the 1940s to accompany the film. As a result of the COVID-19 pandemic, each member of the orchestra recorded their sections for the score from home. The entire soundtrack is composed of songs written and performed by Reznor and Ross and runs for 52 tracks at over an hour and a half, and was released by The Null Corporation on December 4, 2020, the same day coinciding with the film's release. An extended soundtrack (featuring unreleased music and demos not featured in the film) that runs over three hours with 87 tracks, was released through Bandcamp the following week, December 11.

== Release and reception ==
Mank was released in the United States on November 13, 2020, before beginning to stream worldwide on Netflix on December 4, 2020.

IndieWire reported the film played in 75 theaters during its opening weekend and did "similar business" as other new indie releases The Climb and Ammonite, which each averaged about $300 per venue (which would mean a $22,500 debut for Mank). Upon the film's release onto Netflix, it only managed to finish in the top-10 on its first day. IndieWire wrote that it just "didn't gain the attention of other high-profile originals like Da 5 Bloods, The Trial of the Chicago 7, and Hillbilly Elegy," all of which debuted in first or second place.

=== Critical response ===
Rotten Tomatoes reports that 83% of 355 critic reviews were positive, with an average rating of 7.7/10. The site's critics consensus reads: "Sharply written and brilliantly performed, Mank peers behind the scenes of Citizen Kane to tell an old Hollywood story that could end up being a classic in its own right." According to Metacritic, which compiled 52 reviews and calculated a weighted average score of 79 out of 100, the film received "generally favorable reviews".

Eric Kohn of IndieWire gave the film a "B+" and wrote: "However much credit Mankiewicz deserves for Kane, Fincher's remarkable movie makes a compelling argument for appreciating the prescience behind its conception. His life had a rough ending, but the movie about it gives him one last bitter laugh." Writing for the Los Angeles Times, Justin Chang stated "Mank demands your surrender, but also your heightened attention. It's a pleasurably discombobulating experience, sometimes playing like mordant drawing-room comedy and sometimes flirting with expressionist nightmare, as when Welles' dark silhouette looms over a bedridden Mank and his mummified leg."

Owen Gleiberman of Variety praised the performances and production design, saying, "Mank is a tale of Old Hollywood that's more steeped in Old Hollywood – its glamour and sleaze, its layer-cake hierarchies, its corruption and glory – than just about any movie you've seen, and the effect is to lend it a dizzying time-machine splendor." Peter Travers, reviewing the film for ABC News, wrote: "Mank is the most gorgeous piece of cinema you'll see anywhere. Brilliantly shot in black-and-white by Erik Messerschmidt, with costumes to die for by Trish Summerville and a period-authentic score by Trent Reznor and Atticus Ross that somehow isn't defeated by the retro mono sound, Mank is meant to match the look and feel of its era, as if it's eight decades ago and you just bought a ticket."

Jason Bailey of The Playlist was more mixed and gave the film a "C+" grade, calling it a "gorgeously mounted but ultimately distant biopic". The A.V. Club's Ignatiy Vishnevetsky thought it was "conventional to a fault", writing that parts of the film "bear an uncanny resemblance to the kind of awards-bait middlebrow drama usually essayed by BBC-trained hacks."

Mank appeared on 50 critics' year-end top-10 lists, including four first-place rankings and five second-place ones.

=== Accolades ===
Award	Date of ceremony	Category	Recipient(s)	Result	Ref.
AACTA Awards	March 6, 2021	Best International Direction	David Fincher	Nominated	
AACTA Awards	March 6, 2021	Best International Screenplay	Jack Fincher	Nominated	
AACTA Awards	March 6, 2021	Best International Actor	Gary Oldman	Nominated	
AACTA Awards	March 6, 2021	Best International Supporting Actress	Amanda Seyfried	Nominated	
Academy Awards	April 25, 2021	Best Picture	Ceán Chaffin, Eric Roth and Douglas Urbanski	Nominated	
Academy Awards	April 25, 2021	Best Director	David Fincher	Nominated	
Academy Awards	April 25, 2021	Best Actor	Gary Oldman	Nominated	
Academy Awards	April 25, 2021	Best Supporting Actress	Amanda Seyfried	Nominated	
Academy Awards	April 25, 2021	Best Cinematography	Erik Messerschmidt	Won	
Academy Awards	April 25, 2021	Best Costume Design	Trish Summerville	Nominated	
Academy Awards	April 25, 2021	Best Makeup and Hairstyling	Gigi Williams, Kimberley Spiteri and Colleen LaBaff	Nominated	
Academy Awards	April 25, 2021	Best Original Score	Trent Reznor and Atticus Ross	Nominated	
Academy Awards	April 25, 2021	Best Production Design	Donald Graham Burt and Jan Pascale	Won	
Academy Awards	April 25, 2021	Best Sound	Ren Klyce, Jeremy Molod, David Parker, Nathan Nance, and Drew Kunin	Nominated	
ACE Eddie Awards	April 17, 2021	Best Edited Feature Film – Dramatic	Kirk Baxter	Nominated	
Alliance of Women Film Journalists Awards	January 4, 2021	Best Supporting Actress	Amanda Seyfried	Nominated	
Alliance of Women Film Journalists Awards	January 4, 2021	Best Original Screenplay	Jack Fincher	Nominated	
Alliance of Women Film Journalists Awards	January 4, 2021	Best Cinematography	Erik Messerschmidt	Nominated	
American Film Institute Awards	February 26, 2021	Top 10 Movies of the Year	Mank	Won	
American Society of Cinematographers Awards	April 18, 2021	Outstanding Achievement in Cinematography in Theatrical Releases	Erik Messerschmidt	Won	
Art Directors Guild Awards	April 10, 2021	Excellence in Production Design for a Period Film	Donald Graham Burt	Won	
British Academy Film Awards	April 11, 2021	Best Original Screenplay	Jack Fincher	Nominated	
British Academy Film Awards	April 11, 2021	Best Cinematography	Erik Messerschmidt	Nominated	
British Academy Film Awards	April 11, 2021	Best Costume Design	Trish Summerville	Nominated	
British Academy Film Awards	April 11, 2021	Best Makeup and Hair	Kimberley Spiteri and Gigi Williams	Nominated	
British Academy Film Awards	April 11, 2021	Best Original Music	Trent Reznor and Atticus Ross	Nominated	
British Academy Film Awards	April 11, 2021	Best Production Design	Donald Graham Burt and Jan Pascale	Won	
Boston Society of Film Critics Awards	December 13, 2020	Best Supporting Actress	Amanda Seyfried	Runner-up	
Chicago Film Critics Awards	December 21, 2020	Best Supporting Actress	Amanda Seyfried	Nominated	
Chicago Film Critics Awards	December 21, 2020	Best Original Score	Trent Reznor and Atticus Ross	Nominated	
Chicago Film Critics Awards	December 21, 2020	Best Cinematography	Erik Messerschmidt	Nominated	
Chicago Film Critics Awards	December 21, 2020	Best Art Direction	Donald Graham Burt and Jan Pascale	Won	
Chicago Film Critics Awards	December 21, 2020	Best Costume Design	Trish Summerville	Nominated	
Cinema Audio Society Awards	April 17, 2021	Outstanding Achievement in Sound Mixing for a Motion Picture – Live Action	Drew Kunin, Ren Klyce, David Parker, Nathan Nance, Alan Meyerson, Charleen Richards-Steeves and Scott Curtis	Nominated	
Costume Designers Guild Awards	April 13, 2021	Excellence in Period Film	Trish Summerville	Nominated	
Critics' Choice Awards	March 7, 2021	Best Picture	Mank	Nominated	
Critics' Choice Awards	March 7, 2021	Best Actor	Gary Oldman	Nominated	
Critics' Choice Awards	March 7, 2021	Best Supporting Actress	Amanda Seyfried	Nominated	
Critics' Choice Awards	March 7, 2021	Best Director	David Fincher	Nominated	
Critics' Choice Awards	March 7, 2021	Best Original Screenplay	Jack Fincher	Nominated	
Critics' Choice Awards	March 7, 2021	Best Production Design	Donald Graham Burt and Jan Pascale	Won	
Critics' Choice Awards	March 7, 2021	Best Cinematography	Erik Messerschmidt	Nominated	
Critics' Choice Awards	March 7, 2021	Best Costume Design	Trish Summerville	Nominated	
Critics' Choice Awards	March 7, 2021	Best Editing	Kirk Baxter	Nominated	
Critics' Choice Awards	March 7, 2021	Best Hair and Makeup	Mank	Nominated	
Critics' Choice Awards	March 7, 2021	Best Visual Effects	Mank	Nominated	
Critics' Choice Awards	March 7, 2021	Best Score	Trent Reznor and Atticus Ross	Nominated	
Directors Guild of America Awards	April 10, 2021	Outstanding Directorial Achievement in Motion Pictures	David Fincher	Nominated	
Florida Film Critics Circle Awards	December 21, 2020	Best Original Screenplay	Jack Fincher	Nominated	
Florida Film Critics Circle Awards	December 21, 2020	Best Art Direction/Production	Donald Graham Burt	Won	
Florida Film Critics Circle Awards	December 21, 2020	Best Cinematography	Erik Messerschmidt	Won	
Golden Globe Awards	February 28, 2021	Best Motion Picture – Drama	Mank	Nominated	
Golden Globe Awards	February 28, 2021	Best Actor in a Motion Picture – Drama	Gary Oldman	Nominated	
Golden Globe Awards	February 28, 2021	Best Supporting Actress – Motion Picture	Amanda Seyfried	Nominated	
Golden Globe Awards	February 28, 2021	Best Director – Motion Picture	David Fincher	Nominated	
Golden Globe Awards	February 28, 2021	Best Screenplay – Motion Picture	Jack Fincher	Nominated	
Golden Globe Awards	February 28, 2021	Best Original Score – Motion Picture	Trent Reznor and Atticus Ross	Nominated	
Guldbagge Awards	January 25, 2021	Best Foreign Film	David Fincher	Nominated	
Hollywood Critics Association Awards	March 5, 2021	Best Male Director	David Fincher	Nominated	
Hollywood Critics Association Awards	March 5, 2021	Best Supporting Actress	Amanda Seyfried	Nominated	
Hollywood Critics Association Awards	March 5, 2021	Best Cinematography	Erik Messerschmidt	Nominated	
Hollywood Critics Association Awards	March 5, 2021	Best Score	Trent Reznor and Atticus Ross	Nominated	
Hollywood Critics Association Awards	March 5, 2021	Best Hair and Makeup	Kimberley Spiteri, Colleen LaBaff, Gigi Williams and Michelle Audrina Kim	Nominated	
Hollywood Critics Association Awards	March 5, 2021	Best Costume Design	Trish Summerville	Nominated	
Hollywood Critics Association Awards	March 5, 2021	Best Production Design	Donald Graham Burt	Won	
Hollywood Music in Media Awards	January 27, 2021	Best Original Score in a Feature Film	Trent Reznor and Atticus Ross	Nominated	
London Film Critics' Circle	February 7, 2021	Director of the Year	David Fincher	Nominated	
London Film Critics' Circle	February 7, 2021	Supporting Actress of the Year	Amanda Seyfried	Nominated	
London Film Critics' Circle	February 7, 2021	Screenwriter of the Year	Jack Fincher	Nominated	
London Film Critics' Circle	February 7, 2021	Technical Achievement Award	Donald Graham Burt	Nominated	
Los Angeles Film Critics Association Awards	December 20, 2020	Best Supporting Actress	Amanda Seyfried	Runner-up	
Los Angeles Film Critics Association Awards	December 20, 2020	Best Production Design	Donald Graham Burt	Won	
Make-Up Artists and Hair Stylists Guild Awards	April 3, 2021	Best Period and/or Character Make-Up in a Feature-Length Motion Picture	Gigi Williams and Michelle Audrina Kim	Nominated	
Make-Up Artists and Hair Stylists Guild Awards	April 3, 2021	Best Period and/or Character Hair Styling in a Feature-Length Motion Picture	Kimberley Spiteri and Colleen LaBaff	Nominated	
Motion Picture Sound Editors Golden Reel Awards	April 16, 2021	Outstanding Achievement in Sound Editing – Dialogue and ADR for Feature Film	Ren Klyce, Jeremy Molod, Richard Quinn, Cameron Barker, Lisa Chino and Kim Foscato	Nominated	
National Society of Film Critics Awards	January 9, 2021	Best Supporting Actress	Amanda Seyfried	Runner-up	
Producers Guild of America Awards	March 24, 2021	Outstanding Producer of Theatrical Motion Pictures	Ceán Chaffin, Eric Roth and Douglas Urbanski	Nominated	
San Diego Film Critics Society Awards	January 11, 2021	Best Supporting Actress	Amanda Seyfried	Runner-up	
San Diego Film Critics Society Awards	January 11, 2021	Best Cinematography	Erik Messerschmidt	Runner-up	
San Diego Film Critics Society Awards	January 11, 2021	Best Production Design	Donald Graham Burt	Won	
San Diego Film Critics Society Awards	January 11, 2021	Best Costumes	Trish Summerville	Nominated	
Satellite Awards	February 15, 2021	Best Director	David Fincher	Nominated	
Satellite Awards	February 15, 2021	Best Actor in Drama	Gary Oldman	Nominated	
Satellite Awards	February 15, 2021	Actress in a Supporting Role	Amanda Seyfried	Won	
Satellite Awards	February 15, 2021	Best Original Screenplay	Jack Fincher	Nominated	
Satellite Awards	February 15, 2021	Best Original Score	Trent Reznor and Atticus Ross	Nominated	
Satellite Awards	February 15, 2021	Best Cinematography	Erik Messerschmidt	Won	
Satellite Awards	February 15, 2021	Best Film Editing	Kirk Baxter	Nominated	
Satellite Awards	February 15, 2021	Best Sound Editing	Ren Klyce, Jeremy Molod, David Parker, Nathan Nance and Drew Kunin	Nominated	
Satellite Awards	February 15, 2021	Best Visual Effects	Wei Zheng, Simon Carr, James Pastorius and Pablo Helman	Nominated	
Satellite Awards	February 15, 2021	Best Art Direction and Production Design	Donald Graham Burt, Chris Craine, Dan Webster and Jan Pascale	Won	
Satellite Awards	February 15, 2021	Best Costume Design	Trish Summerville	Nominated	
Saturn Awards	October 26, 2021	Best Thriller Film	Mank	Nominated	
Saturn Awards	October 26, 2021	Best Actor	Gary Oldman	Nominated	
Saturn Awards	October 26, 2021	Best Supporting Actress	Amanda Seyfried	Nominated	
Saturn Awards	October 26, 2021	Best Music	Trent Reznor and Atticus Ross	Nominated	
Screen Actors Guild Awards	April 4, 2021	Outstanding Performance by a Male Actor in a Leading Role	Gary Oldman	Nominated	
Set Decorators Society of America Awards	March 31, 2021	Best Achievement in Décor/Design of a Period Feature Film	Jan Pascale and Donald Graham Burt	Won	
St. Louis Film Critics Association	January 17, 2021	Best Actor	Gary Oldman	Nominated	
St. Louis Film Critics Association	January 17, 2021	Best Supporting Actress	Amanda Seyfried	Nominated	
St. Louis Film Critics Association	January 17, 2021	Best Original Screenplay	Jack Fincher	Nominated	
St. Louis Film Critics Association	January 17, 2021	Best Editing	Kirk Baxter	Nominated	
St. Louis Film Critics Association	January 17, 2021	Best Original Score	Trent Reznor & Atticus Ross	Nominated	
St. Louis Film Critics Association	January 17, 2021	Best Cinematography	Erik Messerschmidt	Nominated	
St. Louis Film Critics Association	January 17, 2021	Best Production Design	Donald Graham Burt	Won	
Visual Effects Society Awards	April 6, 2021	Outstanding Supporting Visual Effects in a Photoreal Feature	Wei Zheng, Peter Mavromates, Simon Carr and James Pastorius	Won	

== See also ==
- List of 2020 films based on actual events
- RKO 281, a 1999 film based on the 1996 documentary The Battle Over Citizen Kane
