= Gigi Williams =

American make-up artist

- Born: 1950
- Occupation: Make-up artist
- Spouse: Ronnie Cutrone

Gigi Williams is an American make-up artist. She was nominated for an Academy Award in the category Best Makeup and Hairstyling for the film Mank.

Williams was formerly married to the pop artist Ronnie Cutrone.

Williams was interviewed on screen in the 2022 Netflix docuseries The Andy Warhol Diaries in a brief passage in which she makes comments on why she believes the pop artist was shot by gunwoman Valerie Solanas.

== Selected filmography ==
- Mank (2020; co-nominated with Kimberley Spiteri and Colleen LaBaff)
