= Ma Rainey's Black Bottom (film) =

2020 film by George C. Wolfe

- Official release poster
- Directed by: George C. Wolfe
- Screenplay by: Ruben Santiago-Hudson
- Based on: Ma Rainey's Black Bottom by August Wilson
- Produced by: Denzel Washington; Todd Black; Dany Wolf
- Starring: Viola Davis; Chadwick Boseman; Glynn Turman; Colman Domingo; Michael Potts
- Cinematography: Tobias A. Schliessler
- Edited by: Andrew Mondshein
- Music by: Branford Marsalis
- Production companies: Escape Artists; Mundy Lane Entertainment
- Distributed by: Netflix
- Release date: November 25, 2020
- Running time: 94 minutes
- Country: United States
- Language: English
- Budget: $20–22.5 million

Ma Rainey's Black Bottom is a 2020 American musical drama film directed by George C. Wolfe and written by Ruben Santiago-Hudson, based on the 1982 play of the same name by August Wilson. The film stars Viola Davis, Chadwick Boseman in his final film role, Glynn Turman, Colman Domingo, and Michael Potts. Inspired by the career of blues singer Ma Rainey, the film dramatizes a turbulent recording session in 1920s Chicago.

Produced by Denzel Washington, Todd Black, and Dany Wolf, the project was originally announced alongside Washington's Fences in 2013 as part of his ten-picture deal with HBO. The adaptation eventually moved to Netflix and filming began in Pittsburgh in 2019. Boseman died during post-production in August 2020, making Black Bottom his final film appearance. The film is dedicated to his memory.

Ma Rainey's Black Bottom began a limited theatrical release on November 25, 2020, before beginning to stream on Netflix on December 18. Critics praised the performances of Davis, Boseman, and Turman as well as the costume design and production values. It was named as one of the ten best films of 2020 by the American Film Institute. The film received five nominations at the 93rd Academy Awards, including Best Actor (for Boseman), Best Actress (for Davis), and won two awards: Makeup and Hairstyling and Costume Design. Additionally, the film received eight Critics' Choice Movie Award nominations and nine NAACP Image Award nominations, including Outstanding Motion Picture, with Davis and Boseman both winning lead acting awards. Davis and Boseman also won lead acting awards for their performances at the Screen Actors Guild Awards, making them the first African-American actors in history to win in leading categories in the same year; both received nominations at the Golden Globes, with Boseman posthumously winning Best Actor – Motion Picture Drama.

== Plot ==
Ma Rainey is a highly regarded, strong-willed blues singer who has recently been contracted by white producers to record an album. The story takes place in 1927, when the first recording session is scheduled for Ma by her manager Irvin to take place at Paramount's Recording Studios in Chicago. Seasoned Georgia Jazz Band members Toledo, Cutler, and Slow Drag arrive on time without Ma, which frustrates producer Mel Sturdyvant. They are soon joined by Levee Green, the band's overconfident trumpeter, who has shown Sturdyvant his original compositions in the hopes of getting his own record deal. The other musicians find Levee's behavior disrespectful to Ma. Teased by the rest of the band about his ability to deal with white men, Levee relates how his mother was gang-raped in front of him. His father killed four of the rapists but was then lynched and burned.

Ma arrives an hour late with her lady friend, Dussie Mae, and her nephew, Sylvester. Immediately, she clashes with Sturdyvant and Irvin, making numerous demands. Insulted that the Coca-Cola she was promised has not been provided, Ma refuses to sing until Slow Drag and Sylvester bring her one. Later, she insists to Sturdyvant that the opening words of the album be spoken by Sylvester (who has a pronounced stutter) so he can receive royalties. As a result, the group has to do multiple takes of the song "Ma Rainey's Black Bottom," much to the frustration of the producers and Levee.

Ma confides to Cutler that her white bosses are only interested in her voice and would otherwise regard her as "just a dog in the alley", which he understands and sympathizes with. Meanwhile, Levee and Dussie Mae have sex in the practice room before being interrupted by Slow Drag.

The group finally manages to get through the first track after multiple takes, but discovers an equipment failure has caused it not to be recorded. The band blames Levee, who they think tripped over a wire while eyeing Dussie Mae, though it is revealed to have been damaged already. Their argument leads the religious Cutler to tell a story about a preacher he once knew who got stranded in a small town and was humiliated by a group of white men who tore up his Bible and forced him to dance under threat of death. The uncaring Levee brushes off the story by retorting that if there was a God, he would care for Black people, which he never has. Cutler attacks Levee in anger, and the young man forces him back with a knife while continuing to belittle his beliefs.

The group finally finishes recording, but Ma fires Levee soon afterward, believing his reckless ambition and uncompromising attitude to be detrimental to the band. Levee meets with Sturdyvant about his original songs, but learns that the producer will only buy the rights to the songs and never intended to give him a deal. Levee subsequently suffers a mental breakdown and, after Toledo accidentally steps on his new shoes, fatally stabs him in the back with the knife in a fit of rage. Cutler and Slow Drag leave in horror just as an incensed Ma storms out, leaving behind the broken and despondent Levee who embraces Toledo's corpse. Sometime later, Sturdyvant is recording one of Levee's songs with a band consisting entirely of white musicians (supposedly Paul Whiteman's Orchestra).

== Cast ==
- Chadwick Boseman as Levee Green
- Viola Davis as Ma Rainey
  - Maxayn Lewis as Ma's singing voice.
- Glynn Turman as Toledo
- Colman Domingo as Cutler
- Michael Potts as Slow Drag
- Jonny Coyne as Mel Sturdyvant
- Taylour Paige as Dussie Mae
- Jeremy Shamos as Irvin
- Dusan Brown as Sylvester
- Joshua Harto as Policeman
- Quinn VanAntwerp as Band Singer

== Production ==
=== Development ===
Denzel Washington initially had a deal with the television network HBO to produce nine of the playwright August Wilson's plays into films, with Ma Rainey's Black Bottom among them. By June 2019, the deal had been moved to Netflix. Viola Davis, Chadwick Boseman, Glynn Turman, Colman Domingo, and Michael Potts had been cast in the film, with George C. Wolfe set to direct. In July 2019, Taylour Paige, Jonny Coyne, Jeremy Shamos, and Dusan Brown joined the cast of the film. Maxayn Lewis did most of Rainey's singing for Davis. Jeffrey Wright was originally expected to join the film.

=== Filming ===
Filming commenced on July 8, 2019 in Pittsburgh, with sets converted into 1927 Chicago, and wrapped on August 16, 2019.

On August 28, 2020, Boseman died of colon cancer during post-production, making Ma Rainey's Black Bottom his final film appearance. The film is dedicated to him.

== Release ==
The film was theatrically released in select theaters on November 25, 2020, before beginning to stream on December 18, on Netflix. Netflix also released a 31-minute making-of documentary Ma Rainey's Black Bottom: A Legacy Brought to Screen alongside the film. Upon its digital release to Netflix, the film was the most-watched item over its opening weekend.

== Reception ==
=== Critical response ===
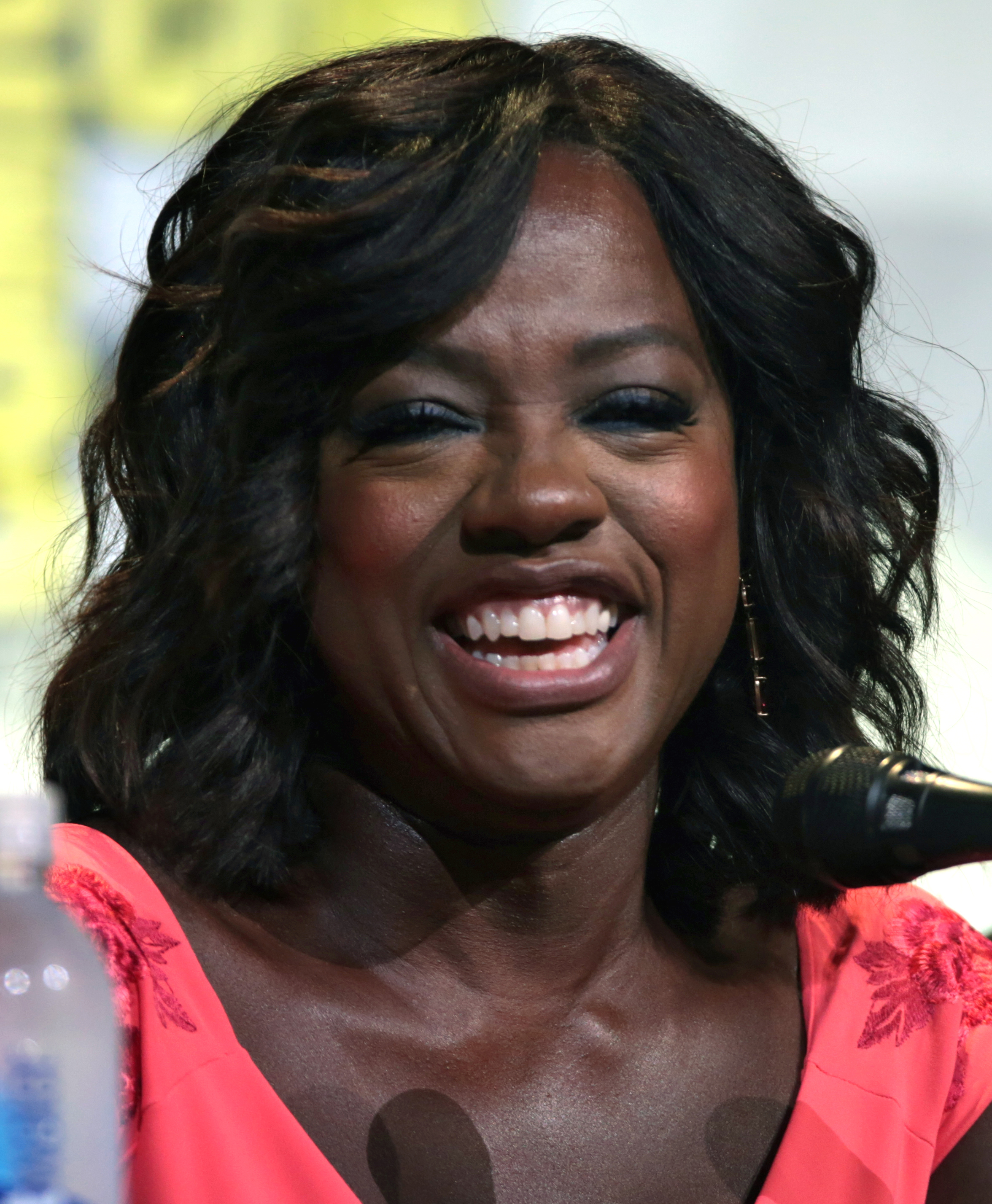
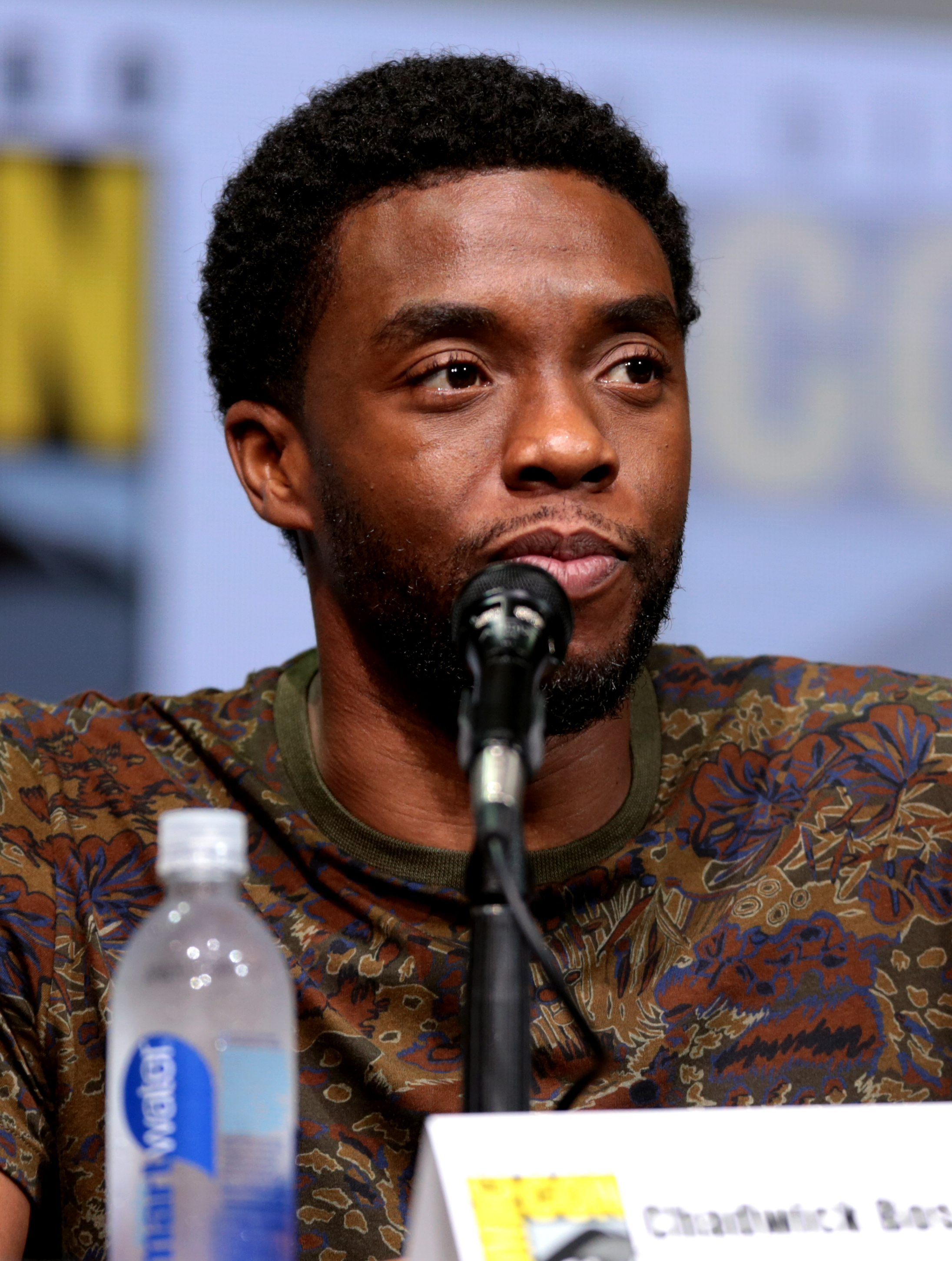
The performances of Viola Davis and Chadwick Boseman received widespread critical acclaim, with many critics describing Boseman's final performance as the best of his career. Both earned Academy Award nominations for Best Actress and Best Actor, respectively.

On Rotten Tomatoes, the film holds an approval rating of 97% based on 318 reviews, with an average rating of 8.2/10. The website's critics consensus reads: "Framed by a pair of powerhouse performances, Ma Rainey's Black Bottom pays affectionate tribute to a blues legend — and Black culture at large." According to Metacritic, which compiled 46 reviews and calculated a weighted average score of 87 out of 100.

For the Los Angeles Times, Justin Chang wrote "Boseman, evincing the same integrity he clung to his entire career, refuses to soft-pedal the destination. He imparts to this seething, shattered man the gift of a broken soul, driven by anger and trauma, and makes him all the more human for it. His final moments of screen time are among his darkest, and also his finest." Eric Kohn of IndieWire gave the film a "B" grade and praised Davis and Boseman's performances, saying: "All of this would be more concerning if Ma Rainey's Black Bottom didn't turn on Wilson's crackling dialogue and a jazzy pace on par with the music. Above all, the movie amounts to a solid resurrection that doesn't muck up the bulk of what made the play click in the first place."

Peter Travers, reviewing the film for ABC News, said: "Davis plays the real-life Ma Rainey, the Georgia singer dubbed the Mother of the Blues. Boseman invests body and soul into Levee, the hot-headed trumpeter who dares to lock horns with Ma in a shabby Chicago recording studio where they're paid to make music the way the white bosses want it. The time is 1927, but the bristling racial tensions feel as timely as ever."

=== Accolades ===
Award	Date of ceremony	Category	Recipient(s)	Result	Ref.
AACTA Awards	March 7, 2021	Best Actor – International	Chadwick Boseman	Won	
AACTA Awards	March 7, 2021	Best Actress – International	Viola Davis	Nominated	
AARP's Movies for Grownups Awards	March 28, 2021	Best Actress	Viola Davis	Nominated	
AARP's Movies for Grownups Awards	March 28, 2021	Best Director	George C. Wolfe	Nominated	
AARP's Movies for Grownups Awards	March 28, 2021	Best Screenwriter	Ruben Santiago-Hudson	Nominated	
AARP's Movies for Grownups Awards	March 28, 2021	Best Time Capsule	Ma Rainey's Black Bottom	Nominated	
AARP's Movies for Grownups Awards	March 28, 2021	Best Ensemble	The cast of Ma Rainey's Black Bottom	Nominated	
Academy Awards	April 25, 2021	Best Actor	Chadwick Boseman	Nominated	
Academy Awards	April 25, 2021	Best Actress	Viola Davis	Nominated	
Academy Awards	April 25, 2021	Best Costume Design	Ann Roth	Won	
Academy Awards	April 25, 2021	Best Makeup and Hairstyling	Sergio López-Rivera, Mia Neal and Jamika Wilson (Note: First African-American women to ever win the award.)	Won	
Academy Awards	April 25, 2021	Best Production Design	Mark Ricker, Karen O'Hara and Diana Stoughton	Nominated	
Alliance of Women Film Journalists	January 4, 2021	Best Actor	Chadwick Boseman	Won	
Alliance of Women Film Journalists	January 4, 2021	Best Actress	Viola Davis	Nominated	
American Film Institute Awards	February 26, 2021	Top 10 Movies of the Year		Won	
Art Directors Guild Awards	April 10, 2021	Excellence in Production Design for a Period Film	Mark Ricker	Nominated	
BET Awards	June 27, 2021	Best Movie		Nominated	
BET Awards	June 27, 2021	Best Actor	Chadwick Boseman (also for Da 5 Bloods)	Won	
BET Awards	June 27, 2021	Best Actress	Viola Davis	Nominated	
Black Reel Awards	April 11, 2021	Outstanding Motion Picture	Denzel Washington, Todd Black and Dany Wolf	Nominated	
Black Reel Awards	April 11, 2021	Outstanding Actor	Chadwick Boseman	Won	
Black Reel Awards	April 11, 2021	Outstanding Actress	Viola Davis	Won	
Black Reel Awards	April 11, 2021	Outstanding Supporting Actor	Colman Domingo	Nominated	
Black Reel Awards	April 11, 2021	Outstanding Screenplay	Ruben Santiago-Hudson	Nominated	
Black Reel Awards	April 11, 2021	Outstanding Ensemble	Avy Kaufman	Nominated	
Black Reel Awards	April 11, 2021	Outstanding Breakthrough Performance, Male	Dusan Brown	Nominated	
Black Reel Awards	April 11, 2021	Outstanding First Screenplay	Ruben Santiago-Hudson	Nominated	
Black Reel Awards	April 11, 2021	Outstanding Costume Design	Ann Roth	Nominated	
Black Reel Awards	April 11, 2021	Outstanding Production Design	Mark Ricker	Nominated	
Boston Society of Film Critics	December 13, 2020	Best Ensemble Cast	The cast of Ma Rainey's Black Bottom	Won	
British Academy Film Awards	April 11, 2021	Best Actor in a Leading Role	Chadwick Boseman	Nominated	
British Academy Film Awards	April 11, 2021	Best Costume Design	Ann Roth	Won	
British Academy Film Awards	April 11, 2021	Best Makeup and Hair	Matiki Anoff, Larry M. Cherry, Sergio Lopez-Rivera and Mia Neal	Won	
Casting Society of America	April 15, 2021	Feature Studio or Independent – Drama	Avy Kaufman, Nancy Mosser and Scotty Anderson	Nominated	
Chicago Film Critics Association	December 21, 2020	Best Actor	Chadwick Boseman	Won	
Chicago Film Critics Association	December 21, 2020	Best Actress	Viola Davis	Nominated	
Chicago Film Critics Association	December 21, 2020	Best Original Score	Branford Marsalis	Nominated	
Chicago Film Critics Association	December 21, 2020	Best Costume Design	Ann Roth	Nominated	
Costume Designers Guild Awards	April 13, 2021	Excellence in Period Film	Ann Roth	Won	
Critics' Choice Movie Awards	March 7, 2021	Best Picture		Nominated	
Critics' Choice Movie Awards	March 7, 2021	Best Actor	Chadwick Boseman	Won	
Critics' Choice Movie Awards	March 7, 2021	Best Actress	Viola Davis	Nominated	
Critics' Choice Movie Awards	March 7, 2021	Best Acting Ensemble	The cast of Ma Rainey's Black Bottom	Nominated	
Critics' Choice Movie Awards	March 7, 2021	Best Adapted Screenplay	Ruben Santiago-Hudson	Nominated	
Critics' Choice Movie Awards	March 7, 2021	Best Production Design	Mark Ricker, Karen O'Hara and Diana Stoughton	Nominated	
Critics' Choice Movie Awards	March 7, 2021	Best Hair & Makeup	Matiki Anoff, Sergio Lopez-Rivera, Mia Neal, Larry M. Cherry, Sian Richards, Deidra Dixon and Jamika Wilson	Won	
Critics' Choice Movie Awards	March 7, 2021	Best Costume Design	Ann Roth	Won	
Dorian Awards	April 18, 2021	LGBTQ Film of the Year		Won	
Dorian Awards	April 18, 2021	Best Film Performance – Actor	Chadwick Boseman	Won	
Dorian Awards	April 18, 2021	Best Film Performance – Actress	Viola Davis	Nominated	
Florida Film Critics Circle	December 21, 2020	Best Actor	Chadwick Boseman	Nominated	
Florida Film Critics Circle	December 21, 2020	Best Actress	Viola Davis	Runner-up	
Florida Film Critics Circle	December 21, 2020	Best Adapted Screenplay	Ruben Santiago-Hudson	Runner-up	
Florida Film Critics Circle	December 21, 2020	Best Ensemble	The cast of Ma Rainey's Black Bottom	Nominated	
GLAAD Media Awards	April 2021	Outstanding Film – Wide Release		Nominated	
Golden Globe Awards	February 28, 2021	Best Actor in a Motion Picture – Drama	Chadwick Boseman	Won	
Golden Globe Awards	February 28, 2021	Best Actress in a Motion Picture – Drama	Viola Davis	Nominated	
Gotham Awards	January 11, 2021	Best Actor	Chadwick Boseman	Nominated	
Hollywood Critics Association	March 5, 2021	Best Actor	Chadwick Boseman	Nominated	
Hollywood Critics Association	March 5, 2021	Best Actress	Viola Davis	Nominated	
Hollywood Critics Association	March 5, 2021	Best Adapted Screenplay	Ruben Santiago-Hudson	Nominated	
Hollywood Critics Association	March 5, 2021	Best Production Design	Mark Ricker	Nominated	
Hollywood Critics Association	March 5, 2021	Best Costume Design	Ann Roth	Nominated	
Hollywood Critics Association	March 5, 2021	Best Ensemble Cast	The cast of Ma Rainey's Black Bottom	Nominated	
Hollywood Critics Association	March 5, 2021	Best Hair & Makeup	Matiki Anoff, Sergio Lopez-Rivera, Mia Neal, Larry M. Cherry, Sian Richards, Deidra Dixon and Jamika Wilson	Won	
Hollywood Music in Media Awards	January 27, 2021	Best Original Score in a Feature Film	Branford Marsalis	Nominated	
Independent Spirit Awards	April 22, 2021	Best Feature		Nominated	
Independent Spirit Awards	April 22, 2021	Best Male Lead	Chadwick Boseman	Nominated	
Independent Spirit Awards	April 22, 2021	Best Female Lead	Viola Davis	Nominated	
Independent Spirit Awards	April 22, 2021	Best Supporting Male	Colman Domingo	Nominated	
Independent Spirit Awards	April 22, 2021	Best Supporting Male	Glynn Turman	Nominated	
London Film Critics' Circle	February 7, 2021	Actor of the Year	Chadwick Boseman	Won	
London Film Critics' Circle	February 7, 2021	Actress of the Year	Viola Davis	Nominated	
Los Angeles Film Critics Association	December 20, 2020	Best Actor	Chadwick Boseman	Won	
Los Angeles Film Critics Association	December 20, 2020	Best Actress	Viola Davis	Runner-up	
Los Angeles Film Critics Association	December 20, 2020	Best Supporting Actor	Glynn Turman	Won	
Make-Up Artists and Hair Stylists Guild Awards	April 3, 2021	Best Period and/or Character Make-Up in a Feature-Length Motion Picture	Matiki Anoff, Sergio Lopez-Rivera, Carl Fullerton and Debi Young	Won	
Make-Up Artists and Hair Stylists Guild Awards	April 3, 2021	Best Period and/or Character Hair Styling in a Feature-Length Motion Picture	Mia Neal, Larry Cherry, Leah Loukas and Tywan Williams	Won	
Motion Picture Sound Editors Awards	April 16, 2021	Outstanding Achievement in Sound Editing – Dialogue and ADR for Feature Film	Skip Lievsay, Paul Urmson, Lidia Tamplenizza and Michael Feuser	Nominated	
Motion Picture Sound Editors Awards	April 16, 2021	Outstanding Achievement in Sound Editing – Musical for Feature Film	Todd Kasow and Tim Marchiafava	Nominated	
MTV Movie & TV Awards	May 16, 2021	Best Performance in a Movie	Chadwick Boseman	Won	
NAACP Image Awards	March 21, 2021	Outstanding Motion Picture		Nominated	
NAACP Image Awards	March 21, 2021	Outstanding Actor in a Motion Picture	Chadwick Boseman	Won	
NAACP Image Awards	March 21, 2021	Outstanding Actress in a Motion Picture	Viola Davis	Won	
NAACP Image Awards	March 21, 2021	Outstanding Supporting Actor in a Motion Picture	Glynn Turman	Nominated	
NAACP Image Awards	March 21, 2021	Outstanding Supporting Actor in a Motion Picture	Colman Domingo	Nominated	
NAACP Image Awards	March 21, 2021	Outstanding Supporting Actress in a Motion Picture	Taylour Paige	Nominated	
NAACP Image Awards	March 21, 2021	Outstanding Directing in a Motion Picture	George C. Wolfe	Nominated	
NAACP Image Awards	March 21, 2021	Outstanding Soundtrack/Compilation Album	Branford Marsalis	Nominated	
NAACP Image Awards	March 21, 2021	Outstanding Ensemble Cast in a Motion Picture	The cast of Ma Rainey's Black Bottom	Won	
National Society of Film Critics	January 9, 2021	Best Actor	Chadwick Boseman	2nd Place	
National Society of Film Critics	January 9, 2021	Best Actress	Viola Davis	2nd Place	
National Society of Film Critics	January 9, 2021	Best Supporting Actor	Glynn Turman	2nd Place	
Online Film Critics Society	January 25, 2021	Best Actor	Chadwick Boseman	Nominated	
Online Film Critics Society	January 25, 2021	Best Actress	Viola Davis	Nominated	
Palm Springs International Film Festival	February 11, 2021	Desert Palm Achievement Award, Actress	Viola Davis	Won	
Producers Guild of America Awards	March 24, 2021	Best Theatrical Motion Picture	Denzel Washington and Todd Black	Nominated	
San Diego Film Critics Society	January 11, 2021	Best Actor	Chadwick Boseman	Nominated	
San Diego Film Critics Society	January 11, 2021	Best Actress	Viola Davis	Nominated	
San Diego Film Critics Society	January 11, 2021	Best Adapted Screenplay	Ruben Santiago-Hudson	Nominated	
San Diego Film Critics Society	January 11, 2021	Best Costume Design	Ann Roth	Nominated	
Satellite Awards	February 15, 2021	Best Motion Picture – Drama		Nominated	
Satellite Awards	February 15, 2021	Best Actor in a Motion Picture – Drama	Chadwick Boseman	Nominated	
Satellite Awards	February 15, 2021	Best Actress in a Motion Picture – Drama	Viola Davis	Nominated	
Satellite Awards	February 15, 2021	Best Adapted Screenplay	Ruben Santiago-Hudson	Nominated	
Satellite Awards	February 15, 2021	Best Costume Design	Ann Roth	Nominated	
Screen Actors Guild Awards	April 4, 2021	Outstanding Performance by a Male Actor in a Leading Role	Chadwick Boseman	Won	
Screen Actors Guild Awards	April 4, 2021	Outstanding Performance by a Female Actor in a Leading Role	Viola Davis	Won	
Screen Actors Guild Awards	April 4, 2021	Outstanding Performance by a Cast in a Motion Picture	Chadwick Boseman, Jonny Coyne, Viola Davis, Colman Domingo, Michael Potts and Glynn Turman	Nominated	
Seattle Film Critics Society	February 15, 2021	Best Actor	Chadwick Boseman	Nominated	
Seattle Film Critics Society	February 15, 2021	Best Actress	Viola Davis	Nominated	
Seattle Film Critics Society	February 15, 2021	Best Ensemble Cast	Avy Kaufman	Nominated	
Seattle Film Critics Society	February 15, 2021	Best Costume Design	Ann Roth	Won	
Set Decorators Society of America Awards	March 31, 2021	Best Achievement in Décor/Design of a Period Feature Film	Karen O'Hara, Diana Stoughton, and Mark Ricker	Nominated	
St. Louis Film Critics Association	January 17, 2021	Best Actor	Chadwick Boseman	Won	
St. Louis Film Critics Association	January 17, 2021	Best Actress	Viola Davis	Nominated	
St. Louis Film Critics Association	January 17, 2021	Best Adapted Screenplay	Ruben Santiago-Hudson	Nominated	
St. Louis Film Critics Association	January 17, 2021	Best Production Design	Mark Ricker	Nominated	
Toronto Film Critics Association	February 7, 2021	Best Actor	Chadwick Boseman	Runner-up	
Toronto Film Critics Association	February 7, 2021	Best Actress	Viola Davis	Runner-up	
Vancouver Film Critics Circle	February 22, 2021	Best Actor	Chadwick Boseman	Won	
Vancouver Film Critics Circle	February 22, 2021	Best Actress	Viola Davis	Nominated	
Writers Guild of America Awards	March 21, 2021	Best Adapted Screenplay	Ruben Santiago-Hudson	Nominated	
