= Sergio López-Rivera =

Spanish make-up artist

- Born: November 8, 1967 (age 58); Seville, Spain
- Occupation: Make-up artist
- Spouse: Stephen Divenere (m. 2015)

Sergio López-Rivera is a Spanish make-up artist. He won an Academy Award in the category Best Makeup and Hairstyling for the film Ma Rainey's Black Bottom.

== Selected filmography ==
- Ma Rainey's Black Bottom (2020; co-won with Mia Neal and Jamika Wilson)
