= 2020–21 film awards season =

Film awards for 2020

- Duration: 12 November 2020 – 25 April 2021

Film Awards seasons
- ← 2019–20 2021–22 →

The 2020–21 film awards season began in December 2020 with the 33rd European Film Awards and ended in April 2021 with the 93rd Academy Awards.

== Award ceremonies ==
Award ceremony	Ceremony date	Best Picture	Best Director	Best Actor	Best Actress	Best Supporting Actor	Best Supporting Actress	Best Original Screenplay	Best Adapted Screenplay	Ref.
55th National Society of Film Critics Awards	9 January 2021	Nomadland	Chloé Zhao; Nomadland	Delroy Lindo; Da 5 Bloods	Frances McDormand; Nomadland	Paul Raci; Sound of Metal	Maria Bakalova; Borat Subsequent Moviefilm	Eliza Hittman; Never Rarely Sometimes Always		
30th Annual Gotham Independent Film Awards	11 January 2021	Nomadland	—N/a	Riz Ahmed; Sound of Metal	Nicole Beharie; Miss Juneteenth	—N/a		Radha Blank; The Forty-Year-Old Version; Dan Sallitt; Fourteen		
92nd National Board of Review Awards	26 January 2021	Da 5 Bloods	Spike Lee; Da 5 Bloods	Riz Ahmed; Sound of Metal	Carey Mulligan; Promising Young Woman	Paul Raci; Sound of Metal	Youn Yuh-jung; Minari	Lee Isaac Chung; Minari	Paul Greengrass and Luke Davies; News of the World	
25th Satellite Awards	15 February 2021	Nomadland (Drama); The Forty-Year-Old Version (Musical or Comedy)	Chloé Zhao; Nomadland	Riz Ahmed (Drama); Sound of Metal; Sacha Baron Cohen (Musical or Comedy); Borat Subsequent Moviefilm	Frances McDormand (Drama); Nomadland; Maria Bakalova (Musical or Comedy); Borat Subsequent Moviefilm	Chadwick Boseman; Da 5 Bloods	Amanda Seyfried; Mank	Emerald Fennell; Promising Young Woman	Christopher Hampton and Florian Zeller; The Father	
78th Golden Globe Awards	28 February 2021	Nomadland (Drama); Borat Subsequent Moviefilm (Musical or Comedy)	Chloé Zhao; Nomadland	Chadwick Boseman (Drama); Ma Rainey's Black Bottom; Sacha Baron Cohen (Musical or Comedy); Borat Subsequent Moviefilm	Andra Day (Drama); The United States vs. Billie Holiday; Rosamund Pike (Musical or Comedy); I Care a Lot	Daniel Kaluuya; Judas and the Black Messiah	Jodie Foster; The Mauritanian	Aaron Sorkin; The Trial of the Chicago 7		
10th AACTA International Awards	5 March 2021	Promising Young Woman	Chloé Zhao; Nomadland	Chadwick Boseman; Ma Rainey's Black Bottom	Carey Mulligan; Promising Young Woman	Sacha Baron Cohen; The Trial of the Chicago 7	Olivia Colman; The Father	Aaron Sorkin; The Trial of the Chicago 7		
26th Critics' Choice Awards	7 March 2021	Nomadland	Chloé Zhao; Nomadland	Chadwick Boseman; Ma Rainey's Black Bottom	Carey Mulligan; Promising Young Woman	Daniel Kaluuya; Judas and the Black Messiah	Maria Bakalova; Borat Subsequent Moviefilm	Emerald Fennell; Promising Young Woman	Chloé Zhao; Nomadland	
73rd Writers 32nd Producers 27th Screen Actors 73rd Directors Guild of America Awards	21, 24 March; 4 & 10 April 2021	Nomadland	Chloé Zhao; Nomadland	Chadwick Boseman; Ma Rainey's Black Bottom	Viola Davis; Ma Rainey's Black Bottom	Daniel Kaluuya; Judas and the Black Messiah	Youn Yuh-jung; Minari	Emerald Fennell; Promising Young Woman	Sacha Baron Cohen, Anthony Hines, Dan Swimer, Peter Baynham, Erica Rivinoja, Dan Mazer, Jena Friedman & Lee Kern; Borat Subsequent Moviefilm	
74th British Academy Film Awards	10–11 April 2021	Nomadland	Chloé Zhao; Nomadland	Anthony Hopkins; The Father	Frances McDormand; Nomadland	Daniel Kaluuya; Judas and the Black Messiah	Youn Yuh-jung; Minari	Emerald Fennell; Promising Young Woman	Christopher Hampton and Florian Zeller; The Father	
36th Independent Spirit Awards	22 April 2021	Nomadland	Chloé Zhao; Nomadland	Riz Ahmed; Sound of Metal	Carey Mulligan; Promising Young Woman	Paul Raci; Sound of Metal	Youn Yuh-jung; Minari	Emerald Fennell; Promising Young Woman		
93rd Academy Awards	25 April 2021	Nomadland	Chloé Zhao; Nomadland	Anthony Hopkins; The Father	Frances McDormand; Nomadland	Daniel Kaluuya; Judas and the Black Messiah	Youn Yuh-jung; Minari	Emerald Fennell; Promising Young Woman	Christopher Hampton and Florian Zeller; The Father	

=== Other Awards ===
Category	33rd European Film Awards 12 December 2020
Best Picture	Another Round
Best Director	Thomas Vinterberg; Another Round
Best Actor	Mads Mikkelsen; Another Round
Best Actress	Paula Beer; Undine
Best Screenplay	Thomas Vinterberg and Tobias Lindholm; Another Round
Ref.	

=== Guild awards ===
Award ceremony	Ceremony date	Main categories winner(s)	Ref.
April 3, 2021	Make-Up Artists and Hair Stylists Guild Awards	Contemporary Make-Up: Birds of Prey – Deborah Lamia Denaver, Sabrina Wilson, Miho Suzuki, and Cale Thomas; Contemporary Hairstyling: Birds of Prey – Adruitha Lee, Cassie Russek, Margarita Pidgeon, and Nikki Nelms; Period and/or Character Make-Up: Ma Rainey's Black Bottom – Matiki Anoff, Sergio Lopez-Rivera, Carl Fullerton, and Debi Young; Period and/or Character Hair Styling: Ma Rainey's Black Bottom – Mia Neal, Larry Cherry, Leah Loukas, and Tywan Williams	
April 6, 2021	Visual Effects Society Awards	The Midnight Sky – Matt Kasmir, Greg Baxter, Chris Lawrence, Max Solomon, and David Watkins	
April 10, 2021	ADG Excellence in Production Design Awards	Period: Mank – Donald Graham Burt; Contemporary: Da 5 Bloods – Wynn Thomas; Fantasy: Tenet – Nathan Crowley	
April 13, 2021	Costume Designers Guild Awards	Contemporary: Promising Young Woman – Nancy Steiner; Period: Ma Rainey's Black Bottom – Ann Roth; Sci-fi or Fantasy: Mulan – Bina Daigeler	
April 16, 2021	Golden Reel Awards	The Trial of the Chicago 7 – Renée Tondelli, Michael Hertlein, Jon Michaels, and Jeena Schoenke	
April 17, 2021	American Cinema Editors Eddie Awards	Drama: The Trial of the Chicago 7 – Alan Baumgarten; Comedy: Palm Springs – Matthew Friedman and Andrew Dickler	
April 17, 2021	Cinema Audio Society Awards	Sound of Metal – Phillip Bladh, Nicolas Becker, Jaime Baksht, Michelle Couttolenc, Carlos Cortez Navarrette, and Kari Vähäkuopus	
April 18, 2021	American Society of Cinematographers Awards	Mank – Erik Messerschmidt	

=== Critics awards ===
Award ceremony	Ceremony date	Main categories winner(s)	Ref.
41st Boston Society of Film Critics Awards	13 December 2020	Nomadland	
86th New York Film Critics Circle Awards	18 December 2020	First Cow	
46th Los Angeles Film Critics Association Awards	20 December 2020	Small Axe	
33rd Chicago Film Critics Association Awards	21 December 2020	Nomadland	
25th Florida Film Critics Circle Awards	21 December 2020	First Cow	
17th EDA Awards	4 January 2021	Nomadland	
25th San Diego Film Critics Society Awards	11 January 2021	Promising Young Woman	
17th St. Louis Film Critics Association Awards	17 January 2021	Nomadland	
19th San Francisco Bay Area Film Critics Circle Awards	18 January 2021	Nomadland	
14th Houston Film Critics Society Awards	18 January 2021	Nomadland	
24th Online Film Critics Society Awards	25 January 2021	Nomadland	
41st London Film Critics' Circle Awards	7 February 2021	Nomadland	
24th Toronto Film Critics Association Awards	7 February 2021	Nomadland	
19th Washington D.C. Area Film Critics Association Awards	8 February 2021	Nomadland	
26th Dallas–Fort Worth Film Critics Association Awards	10 February 2021	Nomadland	
5th Seattle Film Critics Society Awards	15 February 2021	Nomadland	
21st Vancouver Film Critics Circle Awards	22 February 2021	Nomadland	
4th Hollywood Critics Association Film Awards	5 March 2021	Promising Young Woman	
14th Detroit Film Critics Society Awards	8 March 2021	Nomadland	
16th Austin Film Critics Association Awards	19 March 2021	Minari	
