= Austin Film Critics Association Awards 2020 =

Film awards

16th AFCA Awards

Best Film:
Minari

The 16th Austin Film Critics Association Awards, honoring the best in filmmaking for 2020, were announced on March 19, 2021.

== Winners and nominees ==
| Best Film | Best Director |
|---|---|
| 1. Minari; 2. Nomadland; 3. Promising Young Woman; 4. First Cow; 5. Never Rarely Sometimes Always; 6. One Night in Miami...; 7. Palm Springs and Sound of Metal (TIE); 8. The Invisible Man and Mank (TIE) | Lee Isaac Chung – Minari; Emerald Fennell – Promising Young Woman; Eliza Hittman – Never Rarely Sometimes Always; Kelly Reichardt – First Cow; Chloé Zhao – Nomadland |
| Best Actor | Best Actress |
| Riz Ahmed – Sound of Metal; Chadwick Boseman – Ma Rainey's Black Bottom; Anthony Hopkins – The Father; Delroy Lindo – Da 5 Bloods; Steven Yeun – Minari | Carey Mulligan – Promising Young Woman; Nicole Beharie – Miss Juneteenth; Viola Davis – Ma Rainey's Black Bottom; Frances McDormand – Nomadland; Elisabeth Moss – The Invisible Man |
| Best Supporting Actor | Best Supporting Actress |
| Daniel Kaluuya – Judas and the Black Messiah; Leslie Odom Jr. – One Night in Miami...; Paul Raci – Sound of Metal; David Strathairn – Nomadland; Glynn Turman – Ma Rainey's Black Bottom | Youn Yuh-jung – Minari; Maria Bakalova – Borat Subsequent Moviefilm; Olivia Colman – The Father; Amanda Seyfried – Mank; Helena Zengel – News of the World |
| Best Original Screenplay | Best Adapted Screenplay |
| Minari – Lee Isaac Chung; Palm Springs – Andy Siara; Promising Young Woman - Emerald Fennell; Sound of Metal – Darius Marder and Abraham Marder; The Trial of the Chicago 7 – Aaron Sorkin | Nomadland – Chloé Zhao; The Father – Florian Zeller and Christopher Hampton; The Invisible Man – Leigh Whannell; Ma Rainey's Black Bottom – Ruben Santiago-Hudson; One Night in Miami... – Kemp Powers |
| Best Film Editing | Best Ensemble |
| Nomadland - Chloé Zhao; The Father - Yorgos Lamprinos; Mank - Kirk Baxter; Tenet – Jennifer Lame; Sound of Metal – Mikkel E.G. Nielsen | Minari; Da 5 Bloods; Ma Rainey's Black Bottom; One Night in Miami...; The Trial of the Chicago 7 |
| Best Animated Film | Best Foreign Language Film |
| Wolfwalkers; Onward; Over the Moon; A Shaun the Sheep Movie: Farmageddon; Soul | Minari; Another Round; Bacurau; Beanpole; La Llorona |
| Best First Film | Best Documentary |
| Promising Young Woman; Miss Juneteenth; One Night in Miami...; Palm Springs; The 40-Year-Old Version | Boys State; Collective; Crip Camp; Dick Johnson Is Dead; Time |
| Best Cinematography | Best Score |
| Nomadland – Joshua James Richards; Da 5 Bloods – Newton Thomas Sigel; Mank – Erik Messerschmidt; Minari – Lachlan Milne; Tenet – Hoyte van Hoytema | Soul – Trent Reznor, Atticus Ross and Jon Batiste; Da 5 Bloods – Terence Blanchard; Mank – Trent Reznor and Atticus Ross; Minari – Emile Mosseri; Tenet – Ludwig Göransson |
| Best Stunts | Best Motion Capture/Special Effects Performance |
| The Invisible Man; Birds of Prey; Extraction; The Old Guard; Tenet | Elisabeth Moss - The Invisible Man; Luke Davis - The Invisible Man; Andrew Jackson - Tenet; Oliver Jackson-Cohen - The Invisible Man; Matt Kasmir - The Midnight Sky; Terry Notary - The Call of the Wild |
| Bobby McCurdy Memorial Breakthrough Artist Award | Austin Film Award |
| Radha Blank – The 40-Year-Old Version; Lee Isaac Chung – Minari; Sidney Flanigan – Never Rarely Sometimes Always; Alan S. Kim – Minari; Cathy Yan – Birds of Prey | Greenland – Ric Roman Waugh; Bull – Annie Silverstein; The Orange Years – Adam Sweeney; Pahokee – Patrick Bresnan and Ivete Lucas; We Can Be Heroes – Robert Rodriguez |
Special Honorary Award
Honoring Miss Juneteenth with a "Texas Spirit" award, for exemplifying the creative output of the film industry here in the Lone Star State, as well as embodying the character of our community.
