= San Francisco Bay Area Film Critics Circle Awards 2020 =

19th San Francisco Bay Area Film Critics Circle Awards

19th SFBAFCC Awards

January 18, 2021

Picture:
Nomadland

Animated Feature:
Soul

Documentary:
Collective

Foreign Language Picture:
Another Round

The 19th San Francisco Bay Area Film Critics Circle Awards, honoring the best in film for 2020, were given on January 18, 2021.

== Winners and nominees ==
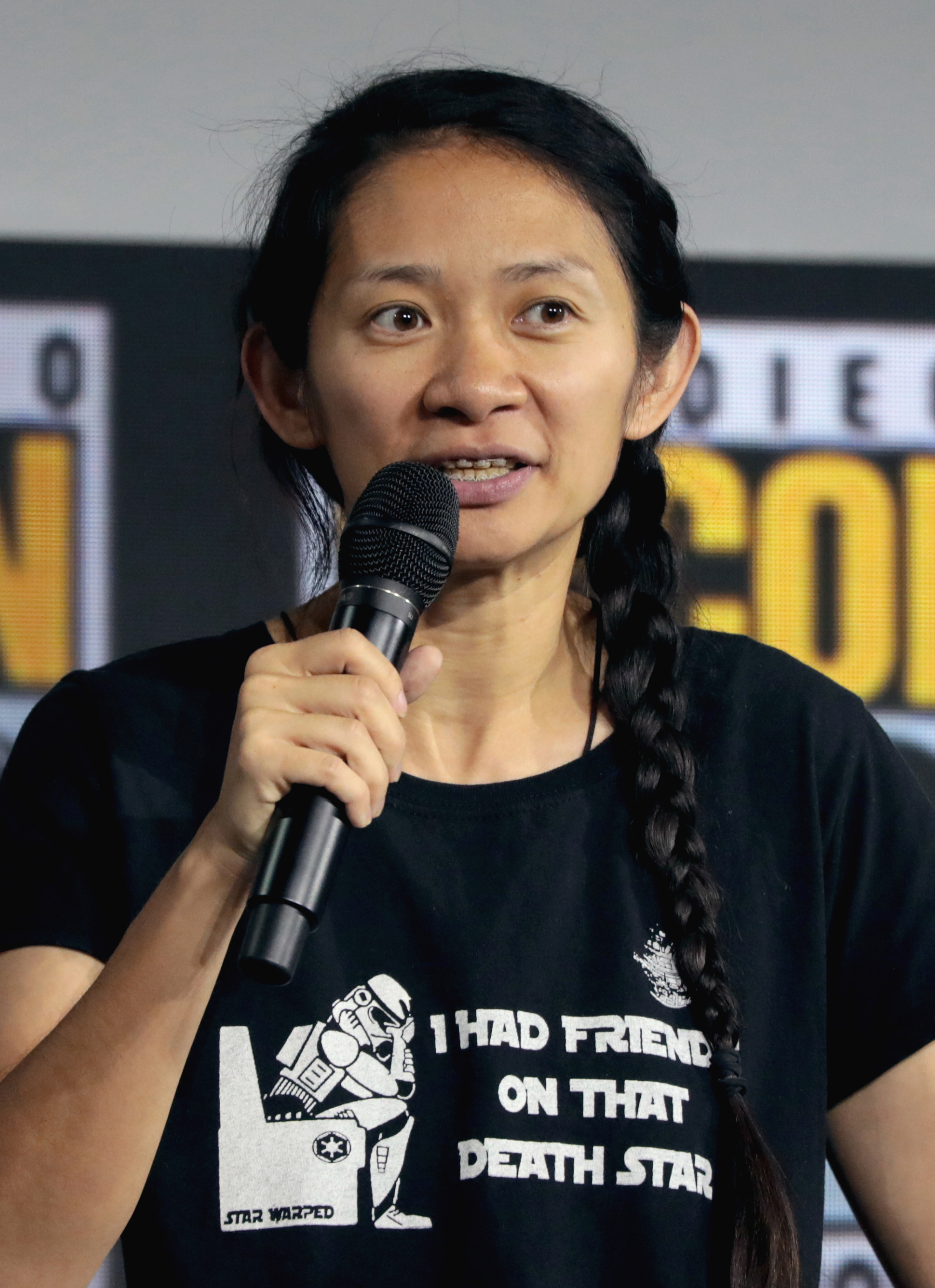
Chloé Zhao, Best Director winner

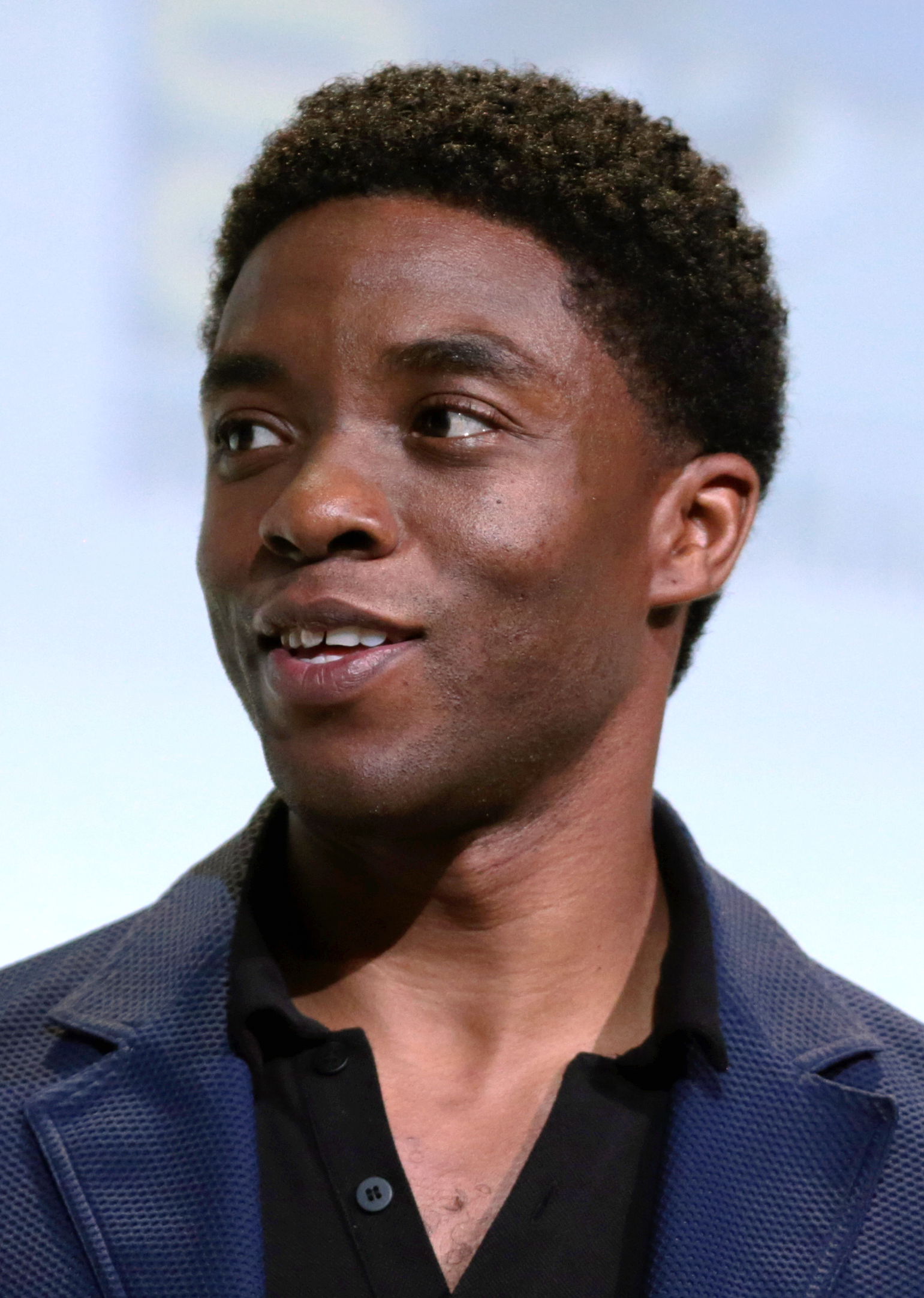
Chadwick Boseman, Best Actor winner

Frances McDormand, Best Actress winner

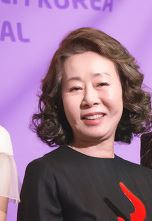
Youn Yuh-jung, Best Supporting Actress winner

These are the nominees for the 19th SFFCC Awards. Winners are listed at the top of each list:

Best Film	Best Director
Nomadland; First Cow; Minari; Never Rarely Sometimes Always; Promising Young Woman	Chloé Zhao – Nomadland; Lee Isaac Chung – Minari; Emerald Fennell – Promising Young Woman; Eliza Hittman – Never Rarely Sometimes Always; Kelly Reichardt – First Cow
Best Actor	Best Actress
Chadwick Boseman – Ma Rainey's Black Bottom (posthumously); Riz Ahmed – Sound of Metal; Anthony Hopkins – The Father; Delroy Lindo – Da 5 Bloods; Steven Yeun – Minari	Frances McDormand – Nomadland; Viola Davis – Ma Rainey's Black Bottom; Sidney Flanigan – Never Rarely Sometimes Always; Elisabeth Moss – The Invisible Man; Carey Mulligan – Promising Young Woman
Best Supporting Actor	Best Supporting Actress
Paul Raci – Sound of Metal; Chadwick Boseman – Da 5 Bloods (posthumously); Sacha Baron Cohen – The Trial of the Chicago 7; Leslie Odom Jr. – One Night in Miami...; David Strathairn – Nomadland	Youn Yuh-jung – Minari; Maria Bakalova – Borat Subsequent Moviefilm; Olivia Colman – The Father; Toni Collette – I'm Thinking of Ending Things; Amanda Seyfried – Mank
Best Adapted Screenplay	Best Original Screenplay
Jonathan Raymond and Kelly Reichardt – First Cow; Charlie Kaufman – I'm Thinking of Ending Things; Kemp Powers – One Night in Miami...; Ruben Santiago-Hudson – Ma Rainey's Black Bottom; Chloé Zhao – Nomadland	Lee Isaac Chung – Minari; Emerald Fennell – Promising Young Woman; Jack Fincher – Mank (posthumously); Eliza Hittman – Never Rarely Sometimes Always; Aaron Sorkin – The Trial of the Chicago 7
Best Animated Feature	Best Documentary Film
Soul; Marona's Fantastic Tale; Onward; Over the Moon; Wolfwalkers	Collective; Boys State; Crip Camp; Time; The Truffle Hunters
Best Foreign Language Film	Best Cinematography
Another Round; Bacurau; Collective; La Llorona; Two of Us	Christopher Blauvelt – First Cow; Erik Messerschmidt – Mank; Joshua James Richards – Nomadland; Newton Thomas Sigel – Da 5 Bloods; Hoyte van Hoytema – Tenet
Best Film Editing	Best Production Design
Chloé Zhao – Nomadland; Alan Baumgarten – The Trial of the Chicago 7; Kirk Baxter – Mank; Jennifer Lame – Tenet; Yorgos Lamprinos – The Father	Anthony Gasparro and Vanessa Knoll – First Cow; Donald Graham Burt and Jan Pascale – Mank; Nathan Crowley and Kathy Lucas – Tenet; Janessa Hitsman and Mark Zuelzke – One Night in Miami...; Karen O'Hara and Mark Ricker – Ma Rainey's Black Bottom
Best Original Score	
Jon Batiste, Trent Reznor, and Atticus Ross – Soul; Terence Blanchard – Da 5 Bloods; Terence Blanchard – One Night in Miami...; Emile Mosseri – Minari; Trent Reznor and Atticus Ross – Mank	

== Special awards ==
=== Special Citation for Independent Cinema ===
- La Llorona, directed by Jayro Bustamante (TIE)
- S#!%house, directed by Cooper Raiff (TIE)
  - The Last Tree, directed by Shola Amoo

=== Marlon Riggs Award ===
- Dawn Porter
