= Sidney Flanigan =

American actress and singer-songwriter

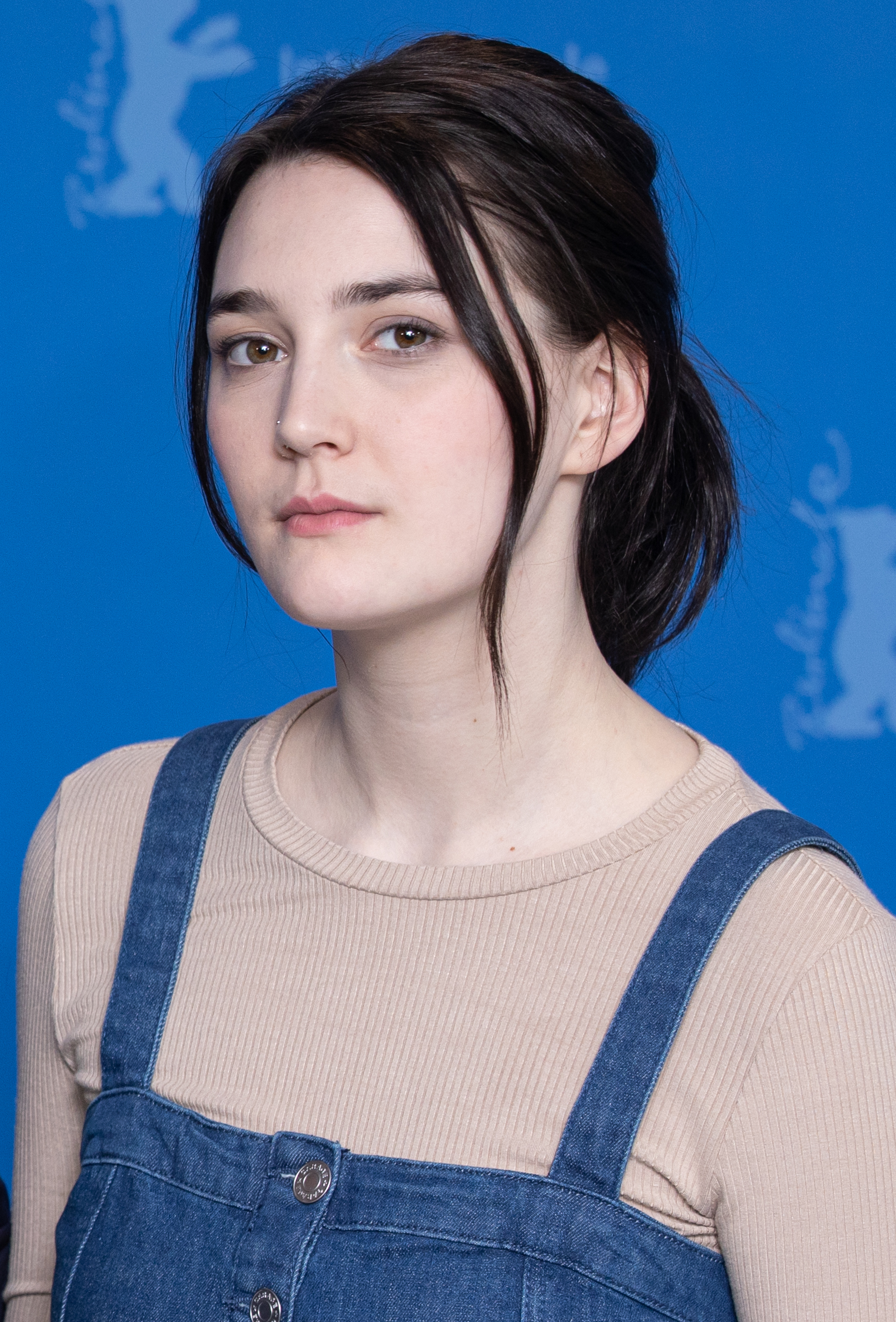
- Flanigan in 2020
- Born: Sidney Jeanne Flanigan; Buffalo, New York, U.S.
- Occupations: Actress; singer–songwriter
- Years active: 2020–present

Sidney Jeanne Flanigan is an American actress and singer-songwriter. Flanigan made her acting debut with the acclaimed independent drama film Never Rarely Sometimes Always (2020), for which she received nominations for the Critics' Choice Movie Award for Best Actress and the Independent Spirit Award for Best Female Lead.

== Early life and education ==
Sidney Jeanne Flanigan was born in Buffalo, New York.

She describes herself as a nonbinary woman who uses she/they pronouns.

== Career ==
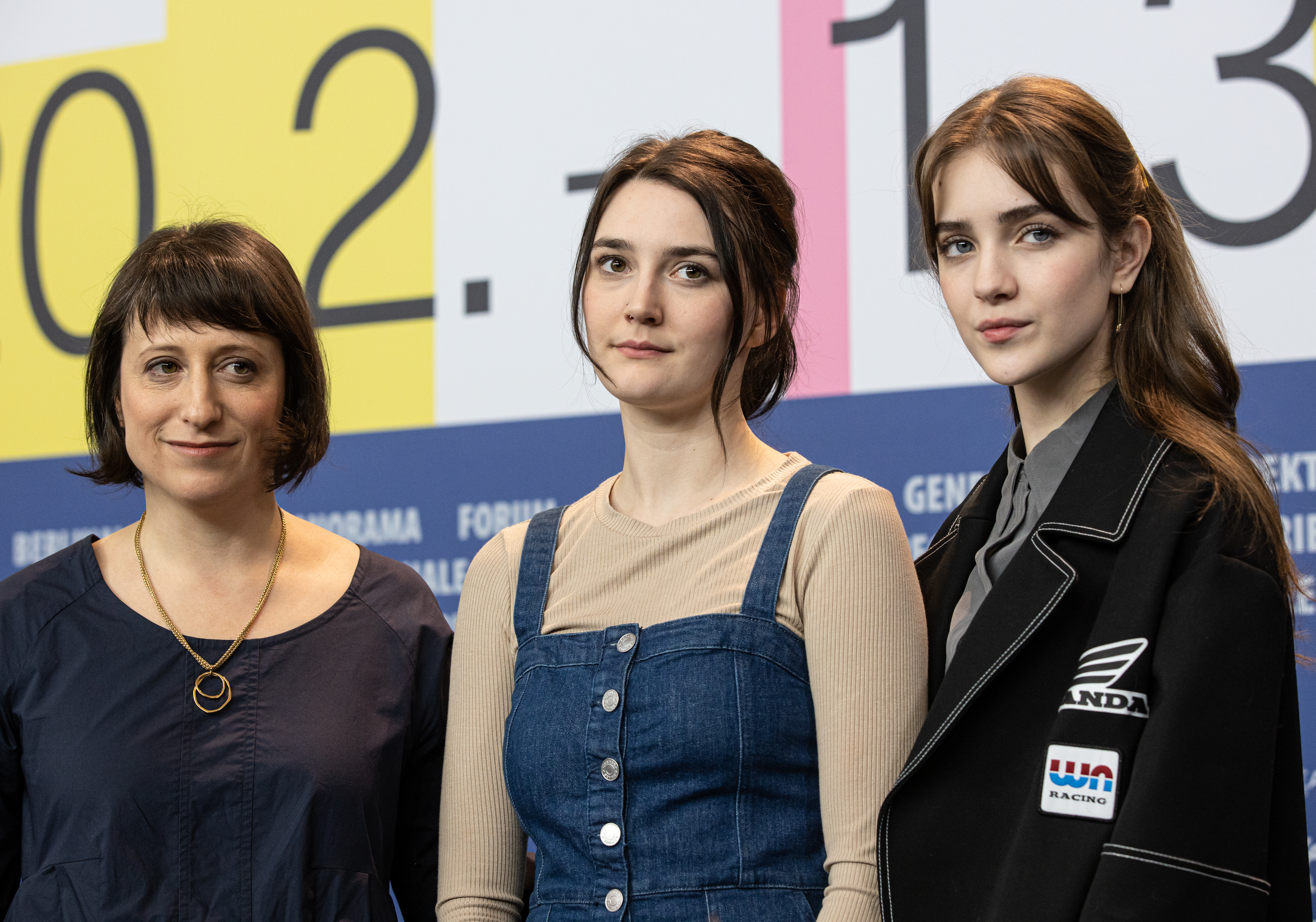
Flanigan with Eliza Hittman and Talia Ryder at the Berlin International Film Festival

In 2020, Flanigan made her acting debut portraying Autumn in the film Never Rarely Sometimes Always, directed by Eliza Hittman. The film had its world premiere at the Sundance Film Festival on January 24, 2020. It was also selected to compete for the Golden Bear in the main competition section at the 70th Berlin International Film Festival, where it won the Silver Bear Grand Jury Prize. Flanigan received widespread acclaim and a collective 45 nominations for her performance, including the Critics' Choice Movie Award for Best Actress and the Independent Spirit Award for Best Female Lead opposite fellow nominees Frances McDormand, Viola Davis, Carey Mulligan, and Zendaya.

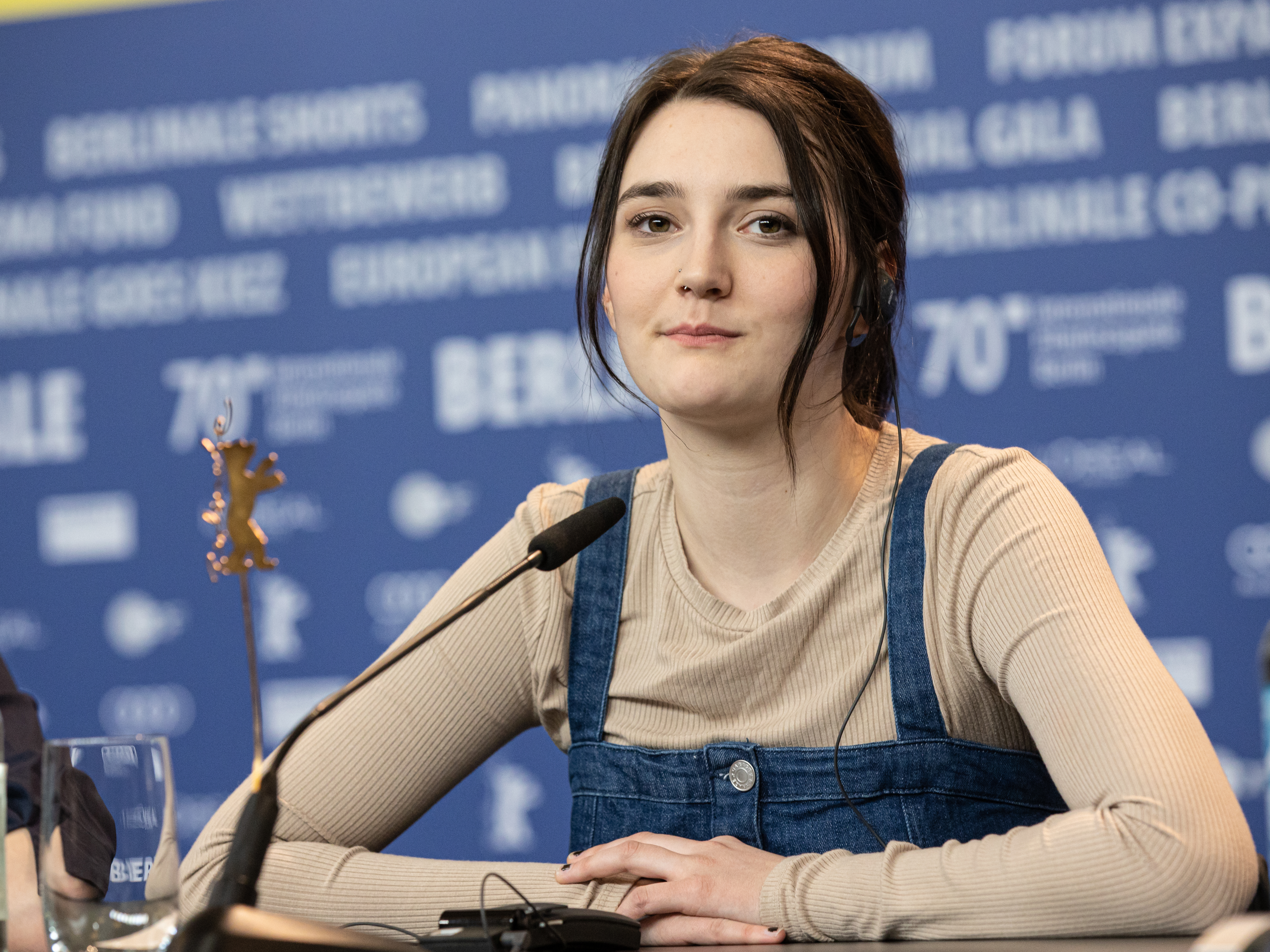
Flanigan answering questions at the Berlin International Film Festival

In an interview with Playboy, writer Ryan Gajewski described Flanigan as, "A new kind of movie star in a variety of ways." Flanigan initially met Hittman when she and director Scott Cummings were filming the documentary Buffalo Juggalos. In addition to her acting career, Flanigan is a recording musician who performs both solo and with her band Starjuice.

In December 2020, it was announced that Flanigan would star in Matthew Kaundart's psychological drama My Twin Is Dead. In March 2021, she also committed to star in Rounding, directed by Saint Frances director Alex Thompson. The film premiered at the 2022 Tribeca Film Festival.

She is also set to lead the indie thriller Only the Good Survive, from writer-director Dutch Southern, which recently premiered at South by Southwest and the musical Eco Village, an official selection of the Rotterdam International Film Festival.

== Filmography ==
Year	Title	Role	Notes
2020	Never Rarely Sometimes Always	Autumn Callahan	
2022	Rounding	Helen Adso	
2023	Only the Good Survive	Brea Dunlee	
2024	Eco Village	Robin	
2024	Line of Fire	Shelley	Short film
2026	The Sweetest Kill	Veronica	
TBA	My Twin Is Dead	Jona	Pre-production

== Awards and nominations ==
Year	Award	Category	Nominated work	Result	Ref.
2020	Boston Society of Film Critics	Best Actress	Never Rarely Sometimes Always	Won	
2020	Chicago Film Critics Association	Most Promising Performer	Never Rarely Sometimes Always	Won	
2020	Florida Film Critics Circle	Breakout Award	Never Rarely Sometimes Always	Won	
2020	Indiana Film Journalists Association	Best Actress	Never Rarely Sometimes Always	Nominated	
2020	Indiana Film Journalists Association	Breakout of the Year	Never Rarely Sometimes Always	Nominated	
2020	New York Film Critics Circle	Best Actress	Never Rarely Sometimes Always	Won	
2021	Alliance of Women Film Journalists	Best Breakthrough Performance	Never Rarely Sometimes Always	Won	
2021	Austin Film Critics Association	Breakthrough Artist Award	Never Rarely Sometimes Always	Nominated	
2021	Chlotrudis Awards	Best Actress	Never Rarely Sometimes Always	Nominated	
2021	Critics' Choice Movie Awards	Best Actress	Never Rarely Sometimes Always	Nominated	
2021	Dorian Awards	Best Actress	Never Rarely Sometimes Always	Nominated	
2021	Dorian Awards	Rising Star of the Year	Never Rarely Sometimes Always	Nominated	
2021	Georgia Film Critics Association	Best Actress	Never Rarely Sometimes Always	Nominated	
2021	Georgia Film Critics Association	Breakthrough Award	Never Rarely Sometimes Always	Nominated	
2021	Gotham Independent Film Awards	Breakthrough Actor	Never Rarely Sometimes Always	Nominated	
2021	Hollywood Film Critics Association	Best Actor/Actress 23 or Under	Never Rarely Sometimes Always	Won	
2021	Houston Film Critics Society	Best Actress	Never Rarely Sometimes Always	Nominated	
2021	Independent Spirit Awards	Best Female Lead	Never Rarely Sometimes Always	Nominated	
2021	International Cinephile Society	Best Actress	Never Rarely Sometimes Always	Nominated	
2021	National Board of Review	Breakthrough Performance	Never Rarely Sometimes Always	Won	
2021	National Society of Film Critics	Best Actress	Never Rarely Sometimes Always	Runner-up	
2021	Online Film Critics Society	Best Actress	Never Rarely Sometimes Always	Nominated	
2021	San Diego Film Critics Society	Breakthrough Artist	Never Rarely Sometimes Always	Nominated	
2021	San Francisco Bay Area Film Critics Circle	Best Actress	Never Rarely Sometimes Always	Nominated	
2021	Seattle Film Critics Society	Best Actress	Never Rarely Sometimes Always	Nominated	
2021	Toronto Film Critics Association	Best Actress	Never Rarely Sometimes Always	Nominated	
2021	Washington D.C. Area Film Critics Association	Best Youth Performance	Never Rarely Sometimes Always	Nominated	
