= 2020 National Society of Film Critics Awards =

Annual US film awards ceremony

55th NSFC Awards
- Date: January 9, 2021

Highlights
- Best Film: Nomadland

The 55th National Society of Film Critics Awards, given on January 9, 2021, honored the best in film for 2020.

== Winners ==
Winners are listed in boldface along with the runner-up positions and counts from the final round:

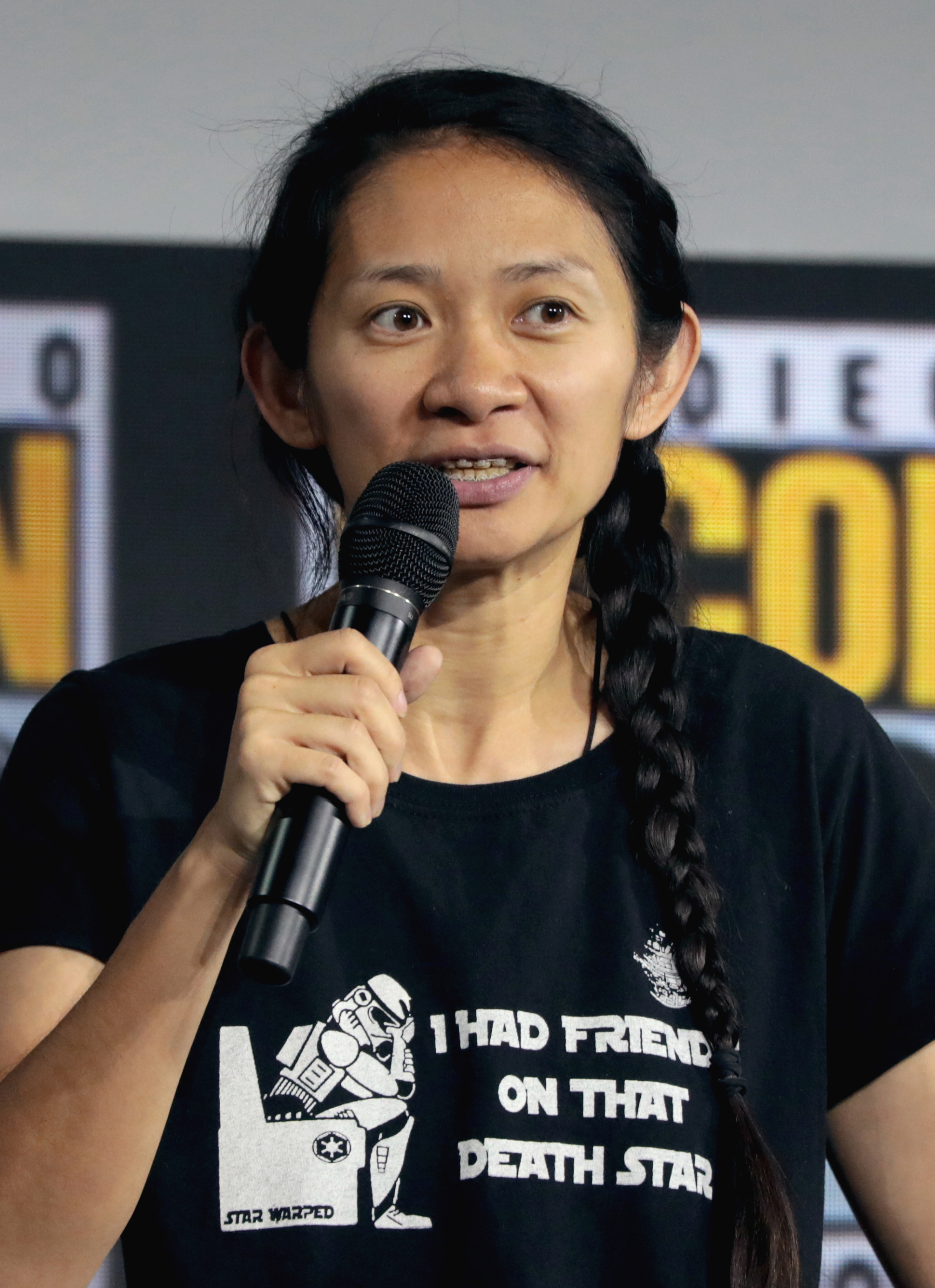
Chloé Zhao, Best Director winner

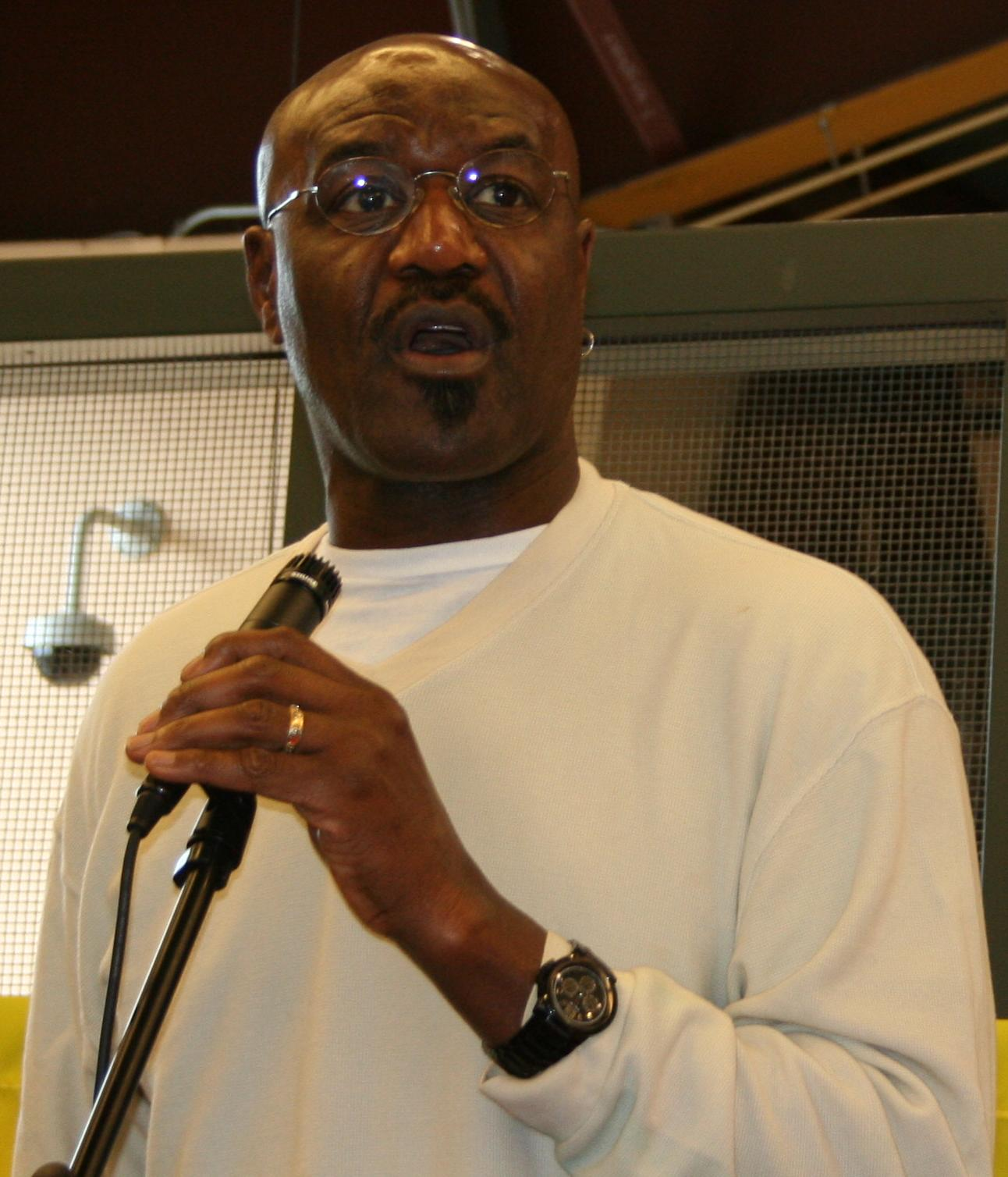
Delroy Lindo, Best Actor winner

Frances McDormand, Best Actress winner

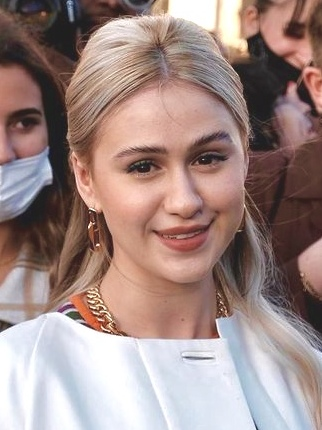
Maria Bakalova, Best Supporting Actress winner

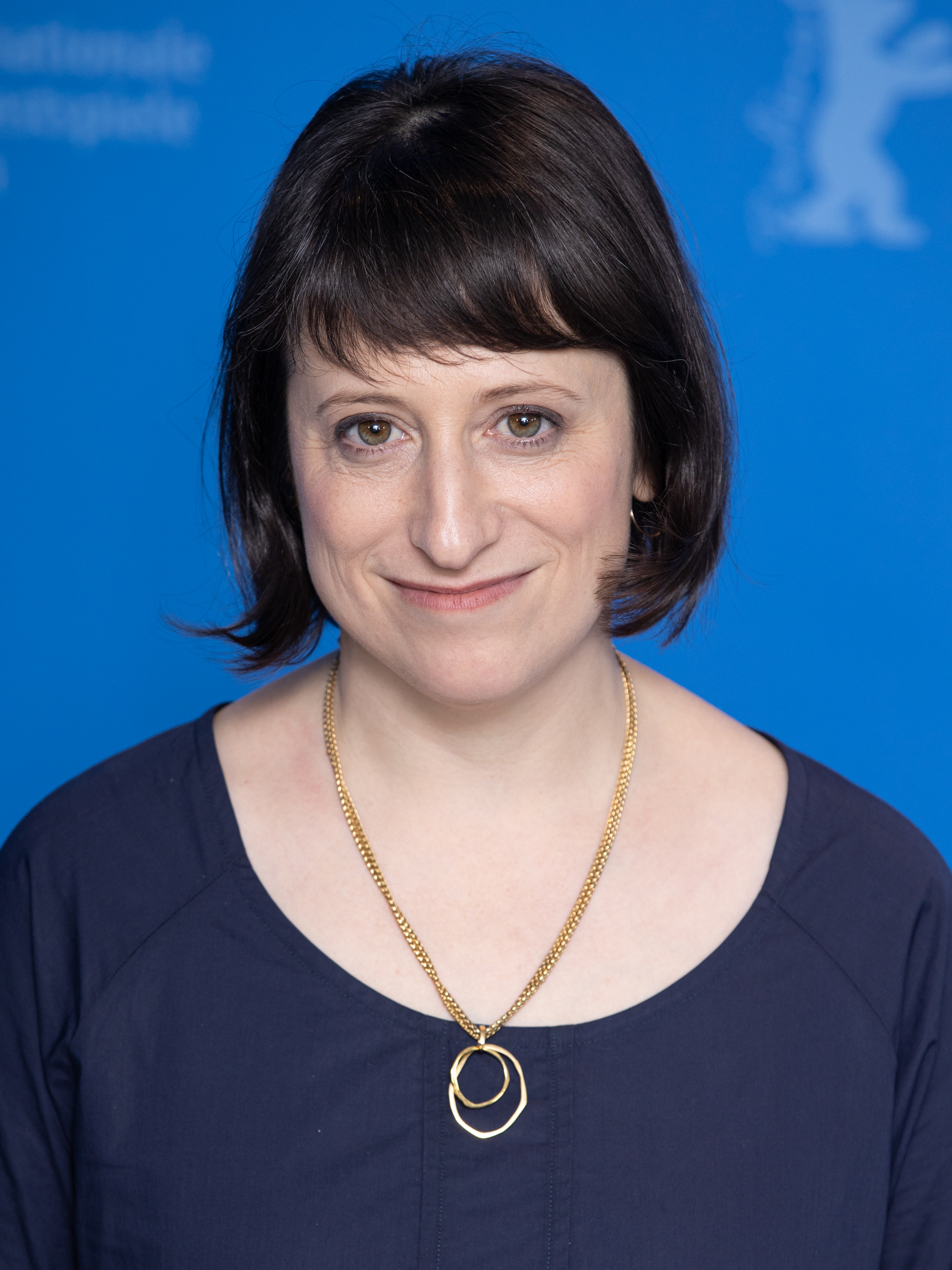
Eliza Hittman, Best Screenplay winner

=== Best Picture ===
1. **Nomadland** (52)
2. First Cow (50)
3. Never Rarely Sometimes Always (41)

=== Best Director ===
1. **Chloé Zhao – Nomadland** (58)
2. Steve McQueen – Small Axe (41)
3. Kelly Reichardt – First Cow (30)

=== Best Actor ===
1. **Delroy Lindo – Da 5 Bloods** (52)
2. Chadwick Boseman – Ma Rainey's Black Bottom (47)
3. Riz Ahmed – Sound of Metal (32)

=== Best Actress ===
1. **Frances McDormand – Nomadland** (46)
2. Viola Davis – Ma Rainey's Black Bottom (33)
3. Sidney Flanigan – Never Rarely Sometimes Always (29)

=== Best Supporting Actor ===
1. **Paul Raci – Sound of Metal** (53)
2. Glynn Turman – Ma Rainey's Black Bottom (36)
3. Chadwick Boseman – Da 5 Bloods (35)

=== Best Supporting Actress ===
1. **Maria Bakalova – Borat Subsequent Moviefilm** (47)
2. Amanda Seyfried – Mank (40)
3. Youn Yuh-jung – Minari (33)

=== Best Screenplay ===
1. **Eliza Hittman – Never Rarely Sometimes Always** (38)
2. Jonathan Raymond and Kelly Reichardt – First Cow (35)
3. Charlie Kaufman – I'm Thinking of Ending Things (29)

=== Best Cinematography ===
1. **Joshua James Richards – Nomadland** (47)
2. Shabier Kirchner – Lovers Rock (41)
3. Leonardo Simões – Vitalina Varela (34)

=== Best Foreign Language Film ===
1. **Collective – Alexander Nanau** (38)
2. Beanpole – Kantemir Balagov / Bacurau – Kleber Mendonça Filho and Juliano Dornelles (36)

=== Best Non-Fiction Film ===
1. **Time – Garrett Bradley** (46)
2. City Hall – Frederick Wiseman (28)
3. Collective – Alexander Nanau (22)

=== Film Heritage Award ===
- Film Comment, founded in 1962 and currently on hiatus, has long been the most substantial and wide-ranging American film magazine.
- Women Make Movies, which, since the 1970s, has been releasing daring and distinctive female-directed movies that more conventional distributors wouldn't touch.
- The Brattle Theatre in Cambridge, Massachusetts. Among America's premier repertory houses, showing arthouse movies steadily since 1953, and holding strong in continuing the time-honored tradition of daily double features.

== Dedication ==
The meeting to decide the winners was dedicated to former Drama Desk president, and film and theater critic William Wolf, who died on March 28, 2020, due to COVID-19. Wolf was a longtime NSFC member, whose career spanned Cue and New York magazines as well as his online Wolf Entertainment Guide.
