= Online Film Critics Society Awards 2020 =

24th Online Film Critics Society Awards

24th Online Film Critics Society Awards
- Date: January 25, 2021

Highlights
- Best Picture: Nomadland
- Most awards: Nomadland (6)
- Most nominations: Da 5 Bloods (8)

The 24th Online Film Critics Society Awards, honoring the best in film for 2020, were announced on January 25, 2021. The nominations were announced on January 19, 2021.

Da 5 Bloods received the most nominations with eight, winning Best Actor for Delroy Lindo. Nomadland won all six of its nominations, including Best Picture.

== Winners and nominees ==
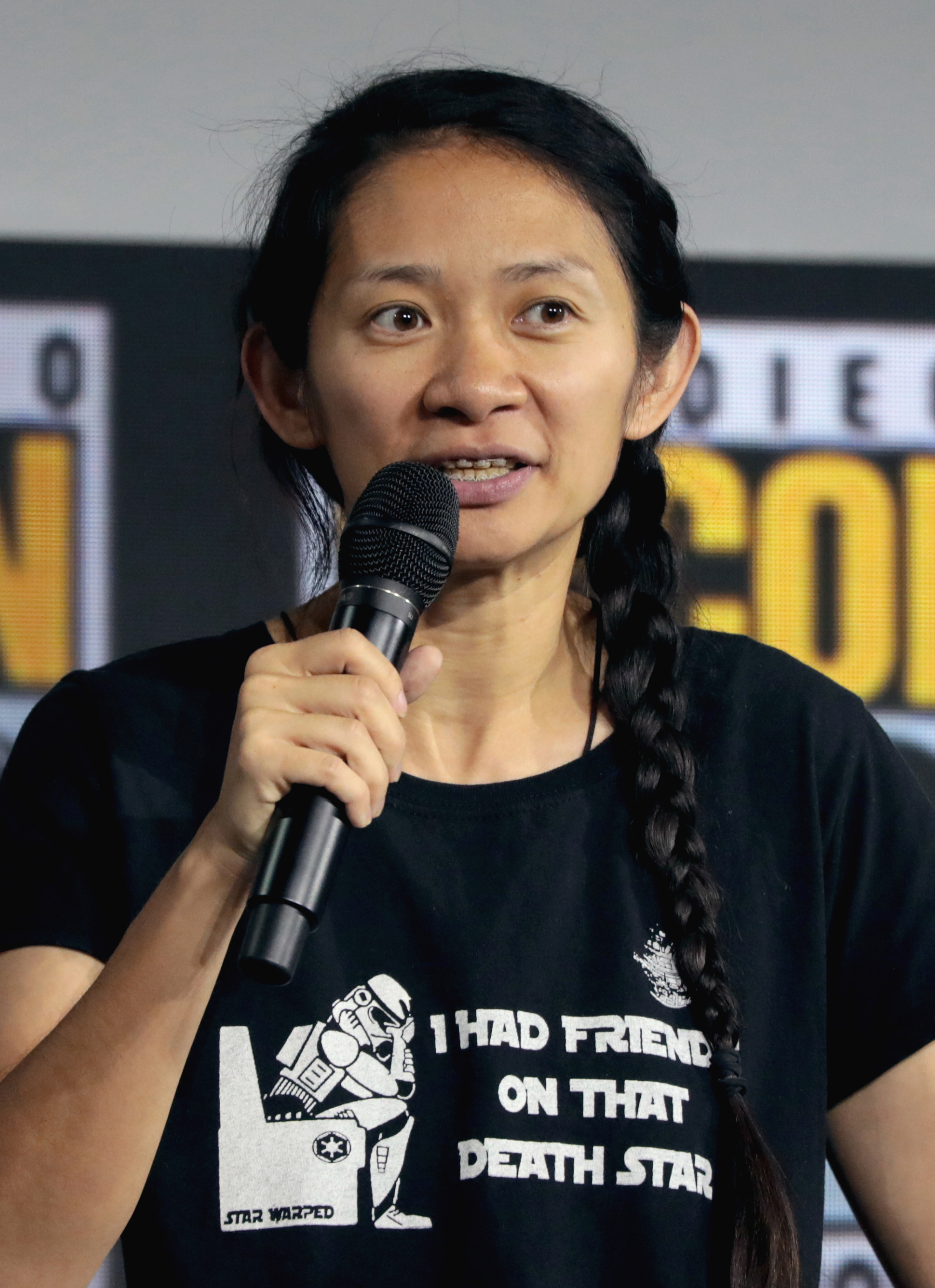
Chloé Zhao, Best Director, Best Adapted Screenplay and Best Editing winner

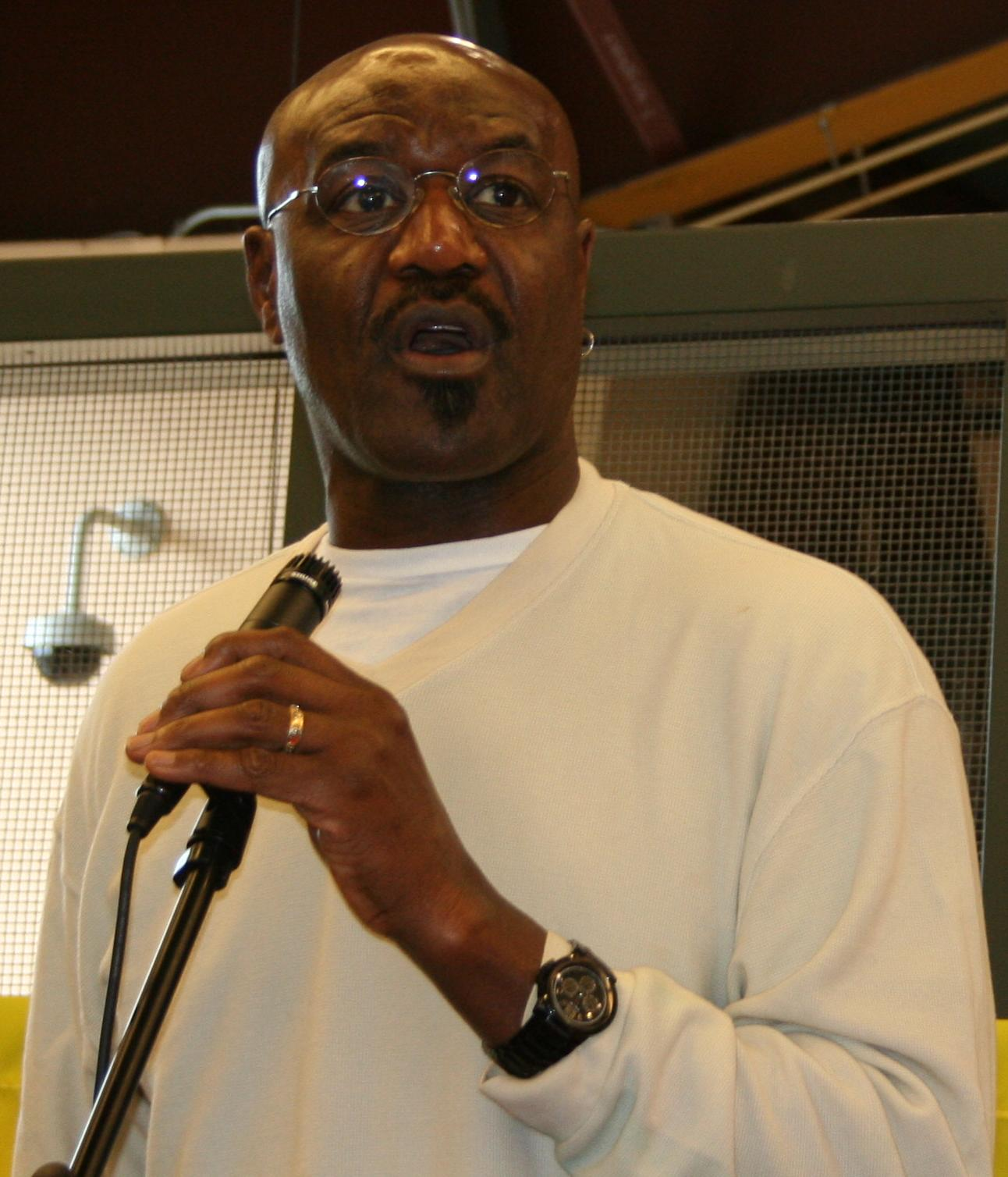
Delroy Lindo, Best Actor winner

Frances McDormand, Best Actress winner

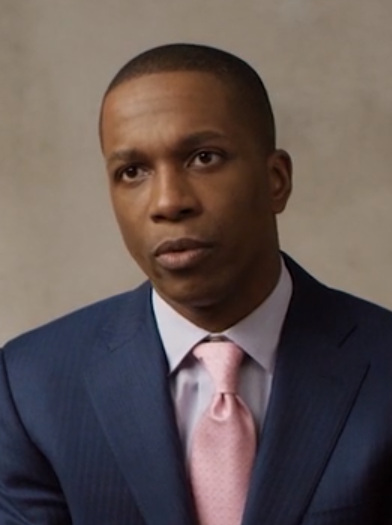
Leslie Odom Jr., Best Supporting Actor winner

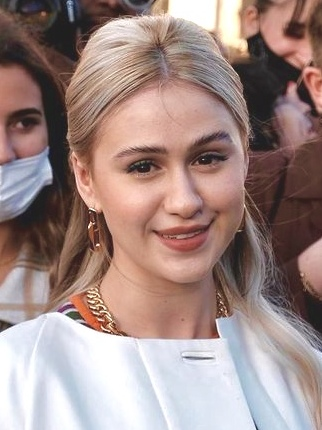
Maria Bakalova, Best Supporting Actress winner

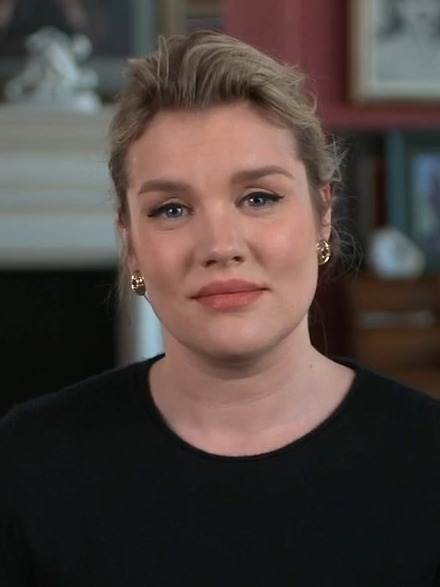
Emerald Fennell, Best Debut Feature and Best Original Screenplay winner

Best Picture	Best Director
1. Nomadland; 2. Da 5 Bloods; 3. Promising Young Woman; 4. Never Rarely Sometimes Always; 5. First Cow; 6. Minari; 7. Sound of Metal; 8. I'm Thinking of Ending Things; 9. Soul; 10. The Trial of the Chicago 7	Chloé Zhao – Nomadland; Emerald Fennell – Promising Young Woman; Eliza Hittman – Never Rarely Sometimes Always; Spike Lee – Da 5 Bloods; Kelly Reichardt – First Cow
Best Actor	Best Actress
Delroy Lindo – Da 5 Bloods as Paul; Riz Ahmed – Sound of Metal as Ruben Stone; Chadwick Boseman – Ma Rainey's Black Bottom as Levee Green (posthumous); Anthony Hopkins – The Father as Anthony; Steven Yeun – Minari as Jacob Yi	Frances McDormand – Nomadland as Fern; Jessie Buckley – I'm Thinking of Ending Things as Young Woman; Viola Davis – Ma Rainey's Black Bottom as Ma Rainey; Sidney Flanigan – Never Rarely Sometimes Always as Autumn Callahan; Carey Mulligan – Promising Young Woman as Cassandra "Cassie" Thomas
Best Supporting Actor	Best Supporting Actress
Leslie Odom Jr. – One Night in Miami... as Sam Cooke; Sacha Baron Cohen – The Trial of the Chicago 7 as Abbie Hoffman; Chadwick Boseman – Da 5 Bloods as "Stormin'" Norman Earl Holloway (posthumous); Bill Murray – On the Rocks as Felix Keane; Paul Raci – Sound of Metal as Joe	Maria Bakalova – Borat Subsequent Moviefilm as Tutar Sagdiyev; Olivia Colman – The Father as Anne; Talia Ryder – Never Rarely Sometimes Always as Skylar; Amanda Seyfried – Mank as Marion Davies; Youn Yuh-jung – Minari as Soon-ja
Best Animated Feature	Best Film Not in the English Language
Soul; Onward; Over the Moon; The Wolf House; Wolfwalkers	Minari (United States); Another Round (Denmark); Bacurau (Brazil); Collective (Romania); La Llorona (Guatemala)
Best Documentary	Best Debut Feature
Dick Johnson Is Dead; Boys State; Collective; The Painter and the Thief; Time	Emerald Fennell – Promising Young Woman; Radha Blank – The Forty-Year-Old Version; Regina King – One Night in Miami...; Darius Marder – Sound of Metal; Andrew Patterson – The Vast of Night
Best Original Screenplay	Best Adapted Screenplay
Emerald Fennell – Promising Young Woman; Danny Bilson, Paul De Meo, Kevin Willmott, and Spike Lee – Da 5 Bloods; Lee Isaac Chung – Minari; Eliza Hittman – Never Rarely Sometimes Always; Aaron Sorkin – The Trial of the Chicago 7	Chloé Zhao – Nomadland; Charlie Kaufman – I'm Thinking of Ending Things; Kemp Powers – One Night in Miami...; Jonathan Raymond and Kelly Reichardt – First Cow; Ruben Santiago-Hudson – Ma Rainey's Black Bottom
Best Cinematography	Best Editing
Joshua James Richards – Nomadland; Christopher Blauvelt – First Cow; Erik Messerschmidt – Mank; Newton Thomas Sigel – Da 5 Bloods; Hoyte van Hoytema – Tenet	Chloé Zhao – Nomadland; Alan Baumgarten – The Trial of the Chicago 7; Kirk Baxter – Mank; Adam Gough – Da 5 Bloods; Jennifer Lame – Tenet
Best Original Score
Trent Reznor and Atticus Ross – Soul; Terence Blanchard – Da 5 Bloods; Ludwig Göransson – Tenet; Emile Mosseri – Minari; Trent Reznor and Atticus Ross – Mank

== Special awards ==
=== Technical Achievement Awards ===
- Emma. – Costume Design
- The Invisible Man – Visual Effects
- Mank – Production Design
- Sound of Metal – Sound Design
- Tenet – Visual Effects

=== Lifetime Achievement Awards ===
- Rob Bottin (Makeup Artist)
- David Byrne (Composer)
- Jane Fonda (Actor)
- Jean-Luc Godard (Director)
- Frederick Wiseman (Documentarian)

=== Special Achievement Awards ===
- Small Axe – Director Steve McQueen created a series of films for the small screen that rivals the best of the theatrical features of the year, that can be seen individually and yet work together to explore a cultural experience largely unseen on big screens, television, or streaming to date.
- Distributor Kino Lorber, for being the first company to offer virtual film distribution as a way to help independent theaters during the pandemic through the Kino Marquee.
- Kudos to the independent theater entities that participated in presenting "Virtual Cinema" when forced to close due to the pandemic. Films that otherwise may not have been seen were made available through online platforms, with ticket prices shared by the distributor with the theater.

=== Non-U.S. Releases ===
- A Beast in Love (Japan)
- The Disciple (India)
- Ghosts (Turkey)
- Mogul Mowgli (United Kingdom)
- New Order (Mexico)
- Notturno (Italy)
- Rocks (United Kingdom)
- Saint Maud (United Kingdom)
- Summer of 85 (France)
- Undine (Germany)

== Films with multiple nominations and awards ==
Films that received multiple nominations
Nominations	Film
8	Da 5 Bloods
6	Minari
6	Nomadland
5	Never Rarely Sometimes Always
5	Promising Young Woman
4	First Cow
4	Mank
4	Sound of Metal
4	The Trial of the Chicago 7
3	I'm Thinking of Ending Things
3	Ma Rainey's Black Bottom
3	One Night in Miami...
3	Soul
3	Tenet
2	Collective
2	The Father

Films that received multiple awards
Awards	Film
6	Nomadland
2	Promising Young Woman
2	Soul
