= National Board of Review Awards 2020 =

American film award

92nd NBR Awards
Best Film: Da 5 Bloods

The 92nd National Board of Review Awards, honoring the best in film for 2020, were announced on January 26, 2021.

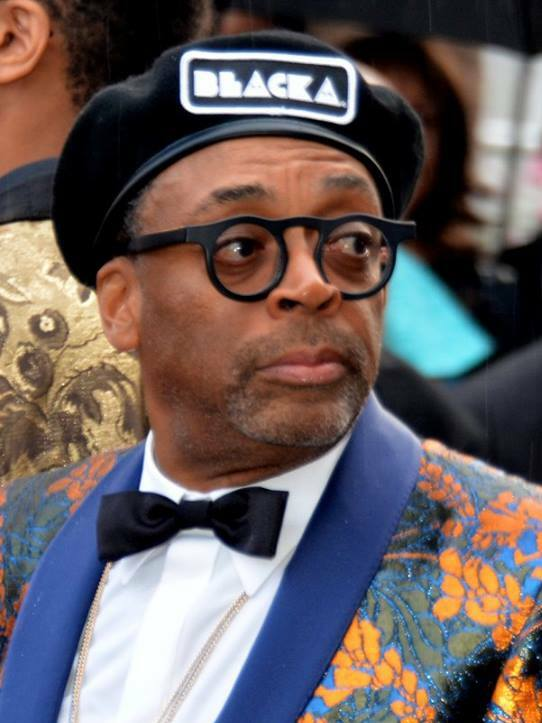
Spike Lee, Best Director winner

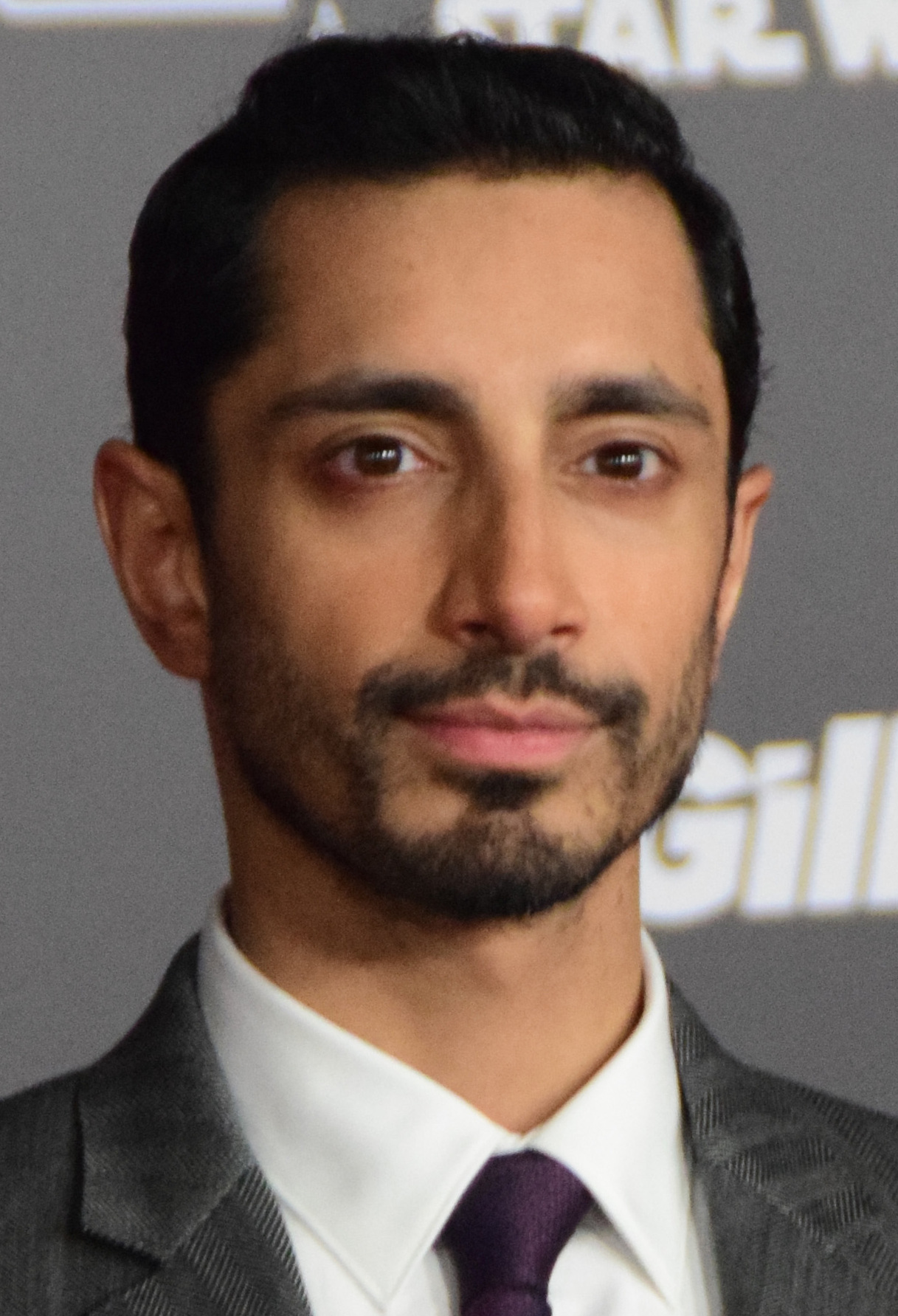
Riz Ahmed, Best Actor winner

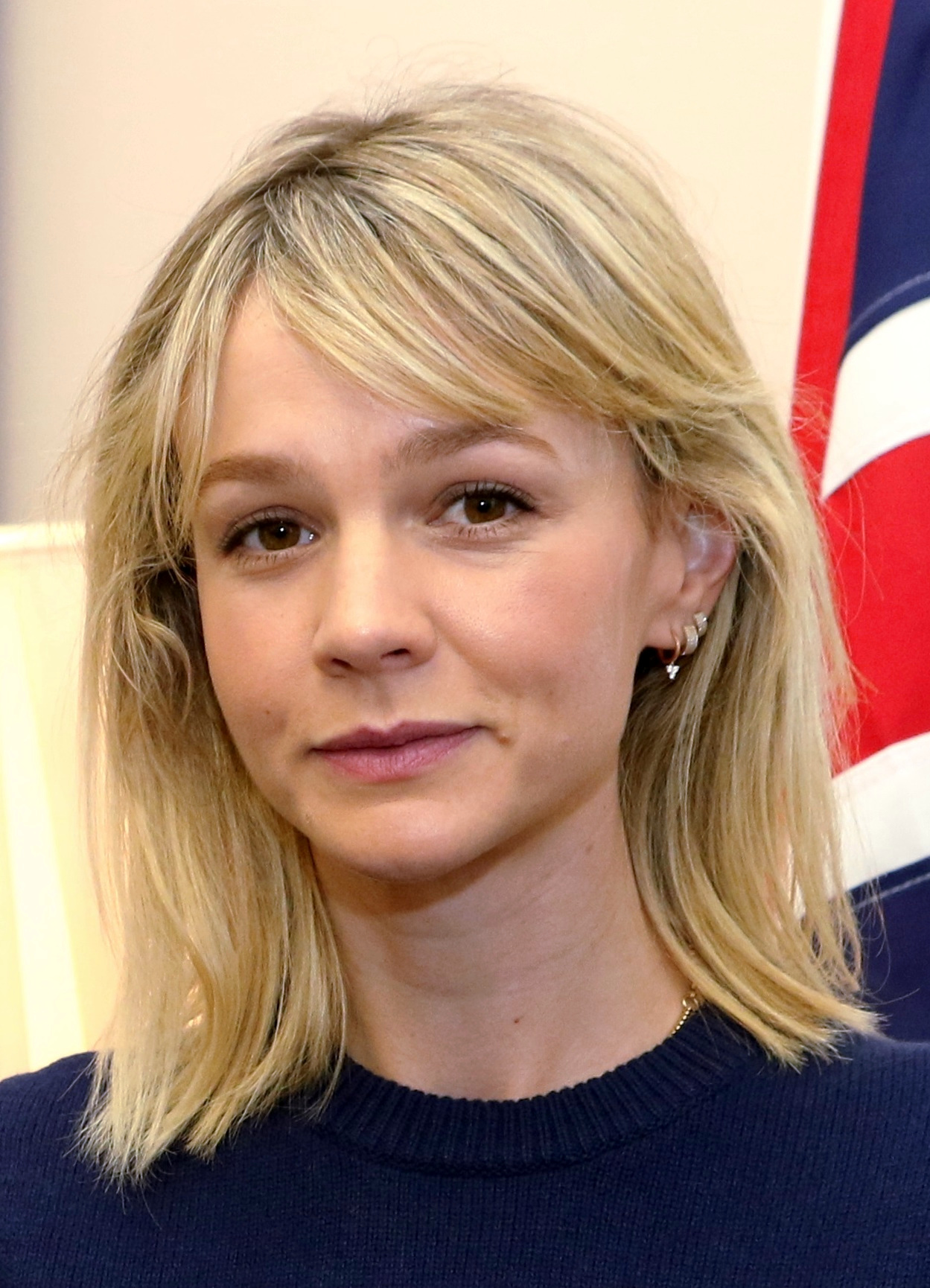
Carey Mulligan, Best Actress winner

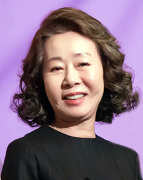
Youn Yuh-jung, Best Supporting Actress winner

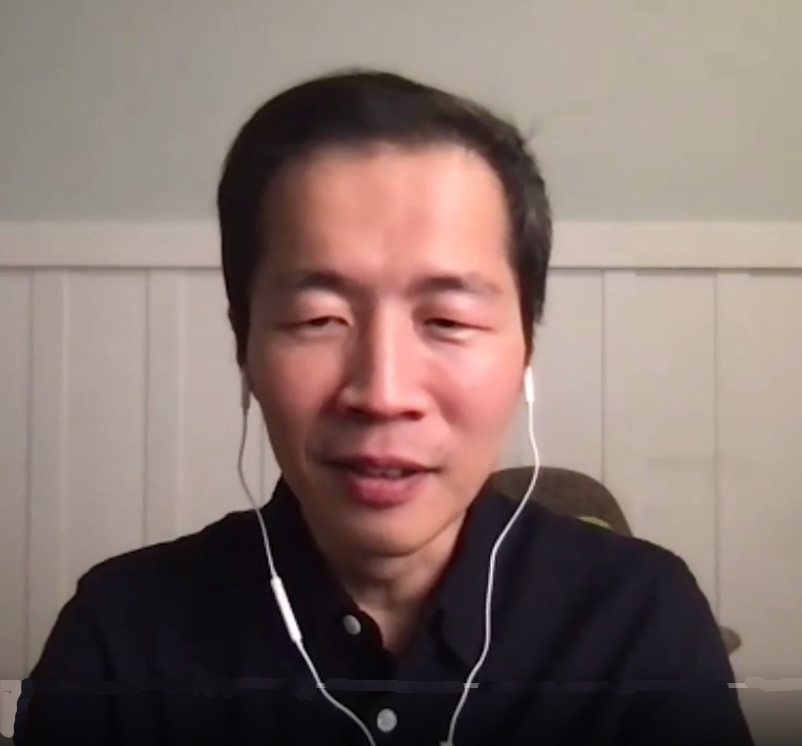
Lee Isaac Chung, Best Original Screenplay winner

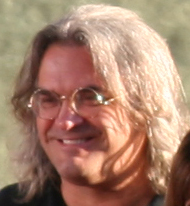
Paul Greengrass, Best Adapted Screenplay co-winner

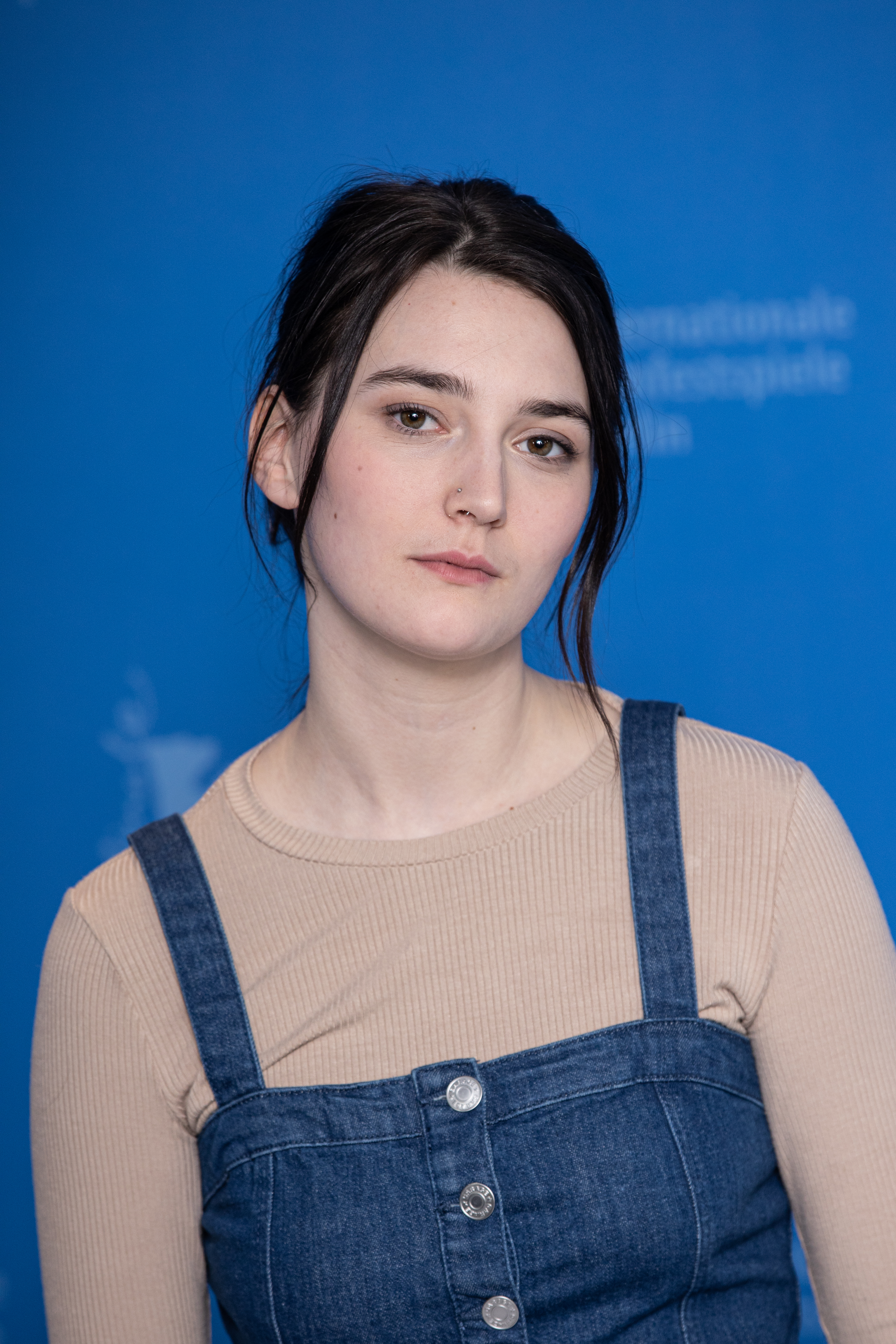
Sidney Flanigan, Breakthrough Performance winner

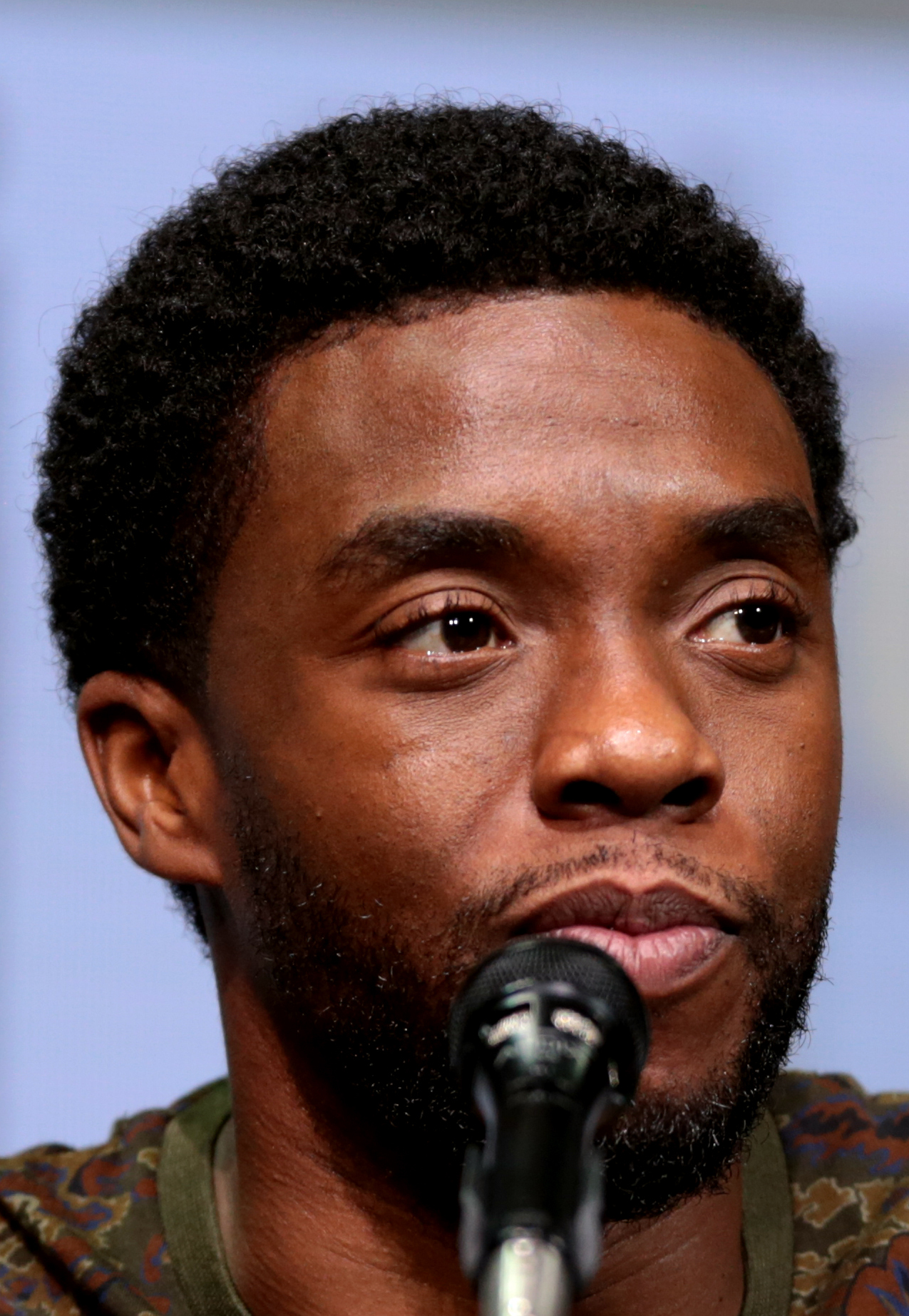
Chadwick Boseman, NBR Icon Award winner

== Top 10 Films ==
Films listed alphabetically except top, which is ranked as Best Film of the Year:

Da 5 Bloods

- First Cow
- The Forty-Year-Old Version
- Judas and the Black Messiah
- The Midnight Sky
- Minari
- News of the World
- Nomadland
- Promising Young Woman
- Soul
- Sound of Metal

== Winners ==
Best Film:

- Da 5 Bloods

Best Director:

- Spike Lee – Da 5 Bloods

Best Actor:

- Riz Ahmed – Sound of Metal

Best Actress:

- Carey Mulligan – Promising Young Woman

Best Supporting Actor:

- Paul Raci – Sound of Metal

Best Supporting Actress:

- Youn Yuh-jung – Minari

Best Original Screenplay:

- Lee Isaac Chung – Minari

Best Adapted Screenplay:

- Paul Greengrass and Luke Davies – News of the World

Best Animated Feature:

- Soul

Best Foreign Language Film:

- La Llorona

Best Documentary:

- Time

Best Ensemble:

- Da 5 Bloods

Breakthrough Performance:

- Sidney Flanigan – Never Rarely Sometimes Always

Best Directorial Debut:

- Channing Godfrey Peoples – Miss Juneteenth

Outstanding Achievement in Cinematography:

- Joshua James Richards – Nomadland

NBR Freedom of Expression:

- One Night in Miami...

NBR Icon Award:

- Chadwick Boseman (posthumous)

== Top 5 Foreign Films ==
La Llorona

- Apples
- Collective
- Dear Comrades!
- The Mole Agent
- Night of the Kings

== Top 5 Documentaries ==
Time

- All In: The Fight for Democracy
- Boys State
- Dick Johnson Is Dead
- Miss Americana
- The Truffle Hunters

== Top 10 Independent Films ==
- The Climb
- Driveways
- Farewell Amor
- Miss Juneteenth
- The Nest
- Never Rarely Sometimes Always
- The Outpost
- Relic
- Saint Frances
- Wolfwalkers
