= Houston Film Critics Society Awards 2020 =

Annual US film awards ceremony

14th Houston Film Critics Society Awards
- Date: January 18, 2021
- Location: Virtual
- Presented by: Houston Film Critics Society
- Website: www.houstonfilmcritics.org

The 14th Houston Film Critics Society Awards were announced virtually on January 18, 2021, at the Museum of Fine Arts, Houston, Texas, United States. The nominations were announced on January 12, 2021.

== Winners and nominees ==
Winners are listed first and highlighted with boldface

Best Picture	Best Director
**Nomadland**; Da 5 Bloods; The Father; Minari; Never Rarely Sometimes Always; One Night in Miami...; Promising Young Woman; Soul; Sound of Metal; The Trial of the Chicago 7	**Chloe Zhao – Nomadland**; Lee Isaac Chung – Minari; Emerald Fennell – Promising Young Woman; Regina King – One Night in Miami...; Darius Marder – Sound of Metal; Aaron Sorkin – The Trial of the Chicago 7
Best Actor	Best Actress
**Riz Ahmed – Sound of Metal**; Chadwick Boseman – Ma Rainey's Black Bottom; Anthony Hopkins – The Father; Delroy Lindo – Da 5 Bloods; Steven Yeun – Minari	**Carey Mulligan – Promising Young Woman**; Viola Davis – Ma Rainey's Black Bottom; Sidney Flanigan – Never Rarely Sometimes Always; Vanessa Kirby – Pieces of a Woman; Frances McDormand – Nomadland
Best Supporting Actor	Best Supporting Actress
**Leslie Odom Jr. – One Night in Miami...**; Chadwick Boseman – Da 5 Bloods; Sacha Baron Cohen – The Trial of the Chicago 7; Bill Murray – On the Rocks; Paul Raci – Sound of Metal	**Maria Bakalova – Borat Subsequent Moviefilm**; Ellen Burstyn – Pieces of a Woman; Olivia Colman – The Father; Amanda Seyfried – Mank; Youn Yuh-jung – Minari
Best Screenplay	Best Animated Feature Film
**Promising Young Woman – Emerald Fennell**; Minari – Lee Isaac Chung; Nomadland – Chloe Zhao; One Night in Miami... – Kemp Powers; Sound of Metal – Darius Marder, Abraham Marder, & Derek Cianfrance; The Trial of the Chicago 7 – Aaron Sorkin	**Soul**; The Croods: A New Age; Onward; Over the Moon; Wolfwalkers
Best Documentary Feature	Best Foreign Language Film
**My Octopus Teacher**; Boys State; Collective; Dick Johnson Is Dead; Time	**A Sun (Taiwan)**; Another Round (Denmark); Bacurau (Brazil); Beanpole (Russia); La Llorona (Guatemala)
Best Original Score	Best Original Song
**Soul**; Mank; The Midnight Sky; News of the World; Tenet	**"Speak Now" – One Night in Miami...**; "Turntables"– All In: The Fight for Democracy; "Io sì (Seen)" – The Life Ahead; "Rocket to the Moon" – Over the Moon; "Wear Your Crown" – The Prom
Best Cinematography	Best Visual Effects
**Nomadland**; Tenet; Mank; Minari; News of the World	**Tenet**; The Invisible Man; The Midnight Sky
Best Stunt Coordination Team	Texas Independent Film Award
**Tenet**; Birds of Prey; Mulan; The Old Guard; Wonder Woman 1984	**Yellow Rose**; Boys State; Miss Juneteenth; Ready or Not; The Vast of Night
Best Poster Design
**Da 5 Bloods**
