= San Diego Film Critics Society Awards 2020 =

Annual US film awards ceremony

25th San Diego Film Critics Society Awards
- Date: January 11, 2021
- Site: San Diego, California, U.S.

Highlights
- Best Picture: Promising Young Woman
- Most awards: The Forty-Year-Old Version / Nomadland / Promising Young Woman / Sound of Metal (2)
- Most nominations: Sound of Metal (8)

The 25th San Diego Film Critics Society Awards were announced on January 11, 2021. The nominations were announced on January 8, 2021, with Sound of Metal leading the nominations with eight.

== Winners and nominees ==
Winners are listed at the top of each list in bold, while the runner-ups and nominees for each category are listed under them.

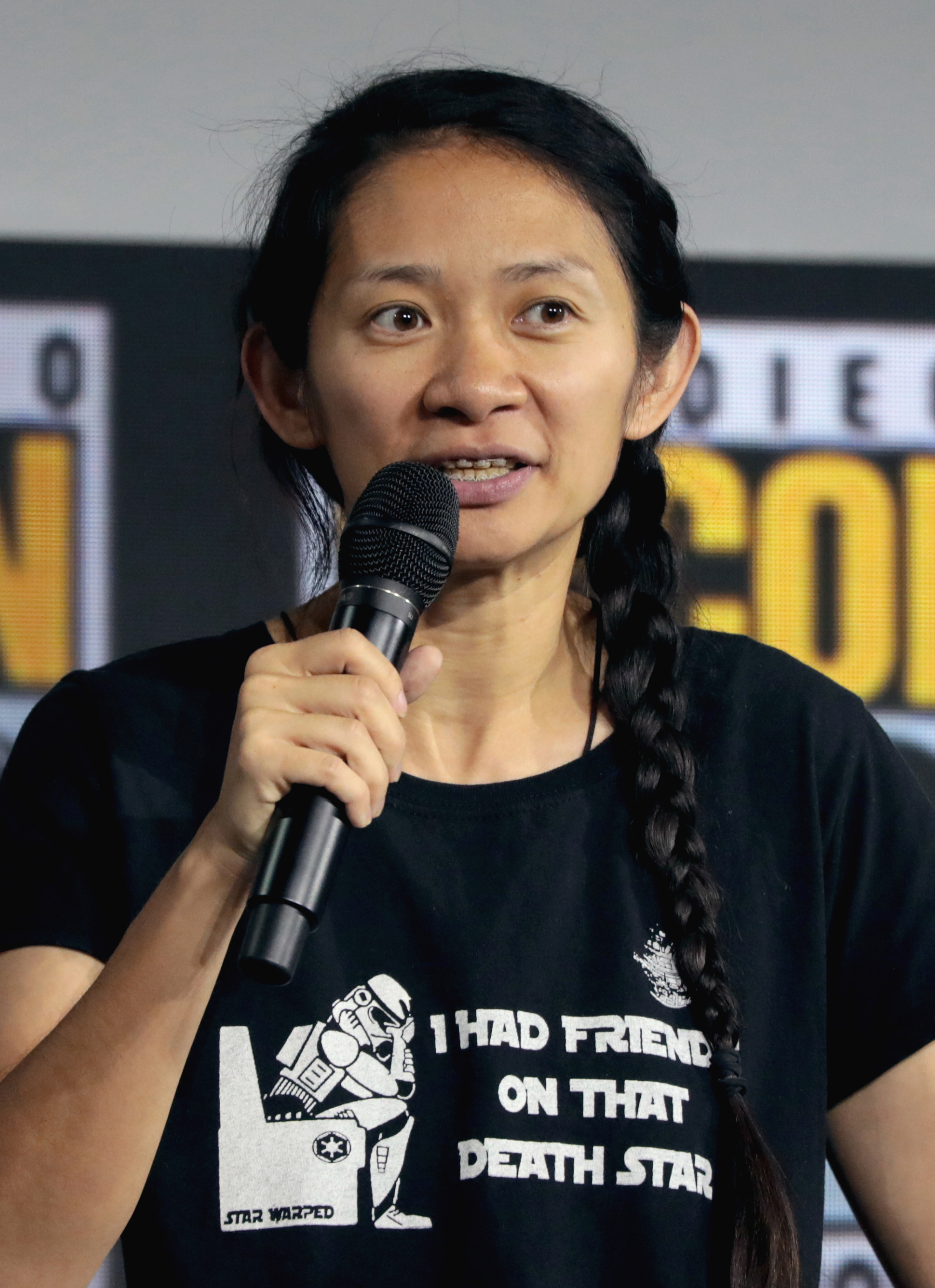
Chloé Zhao, Best Director winner

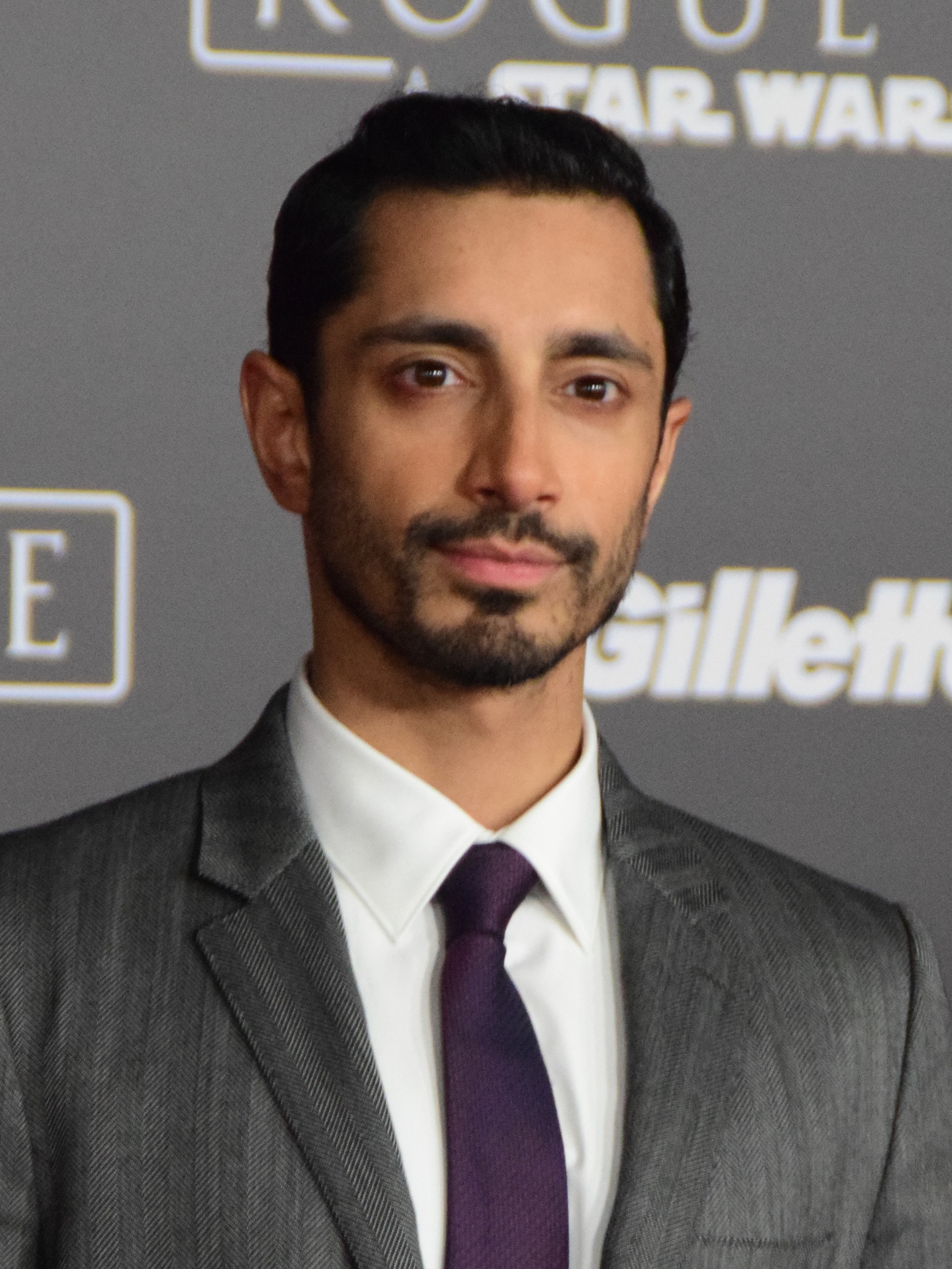
Riz Ahmed, Best Actor winner

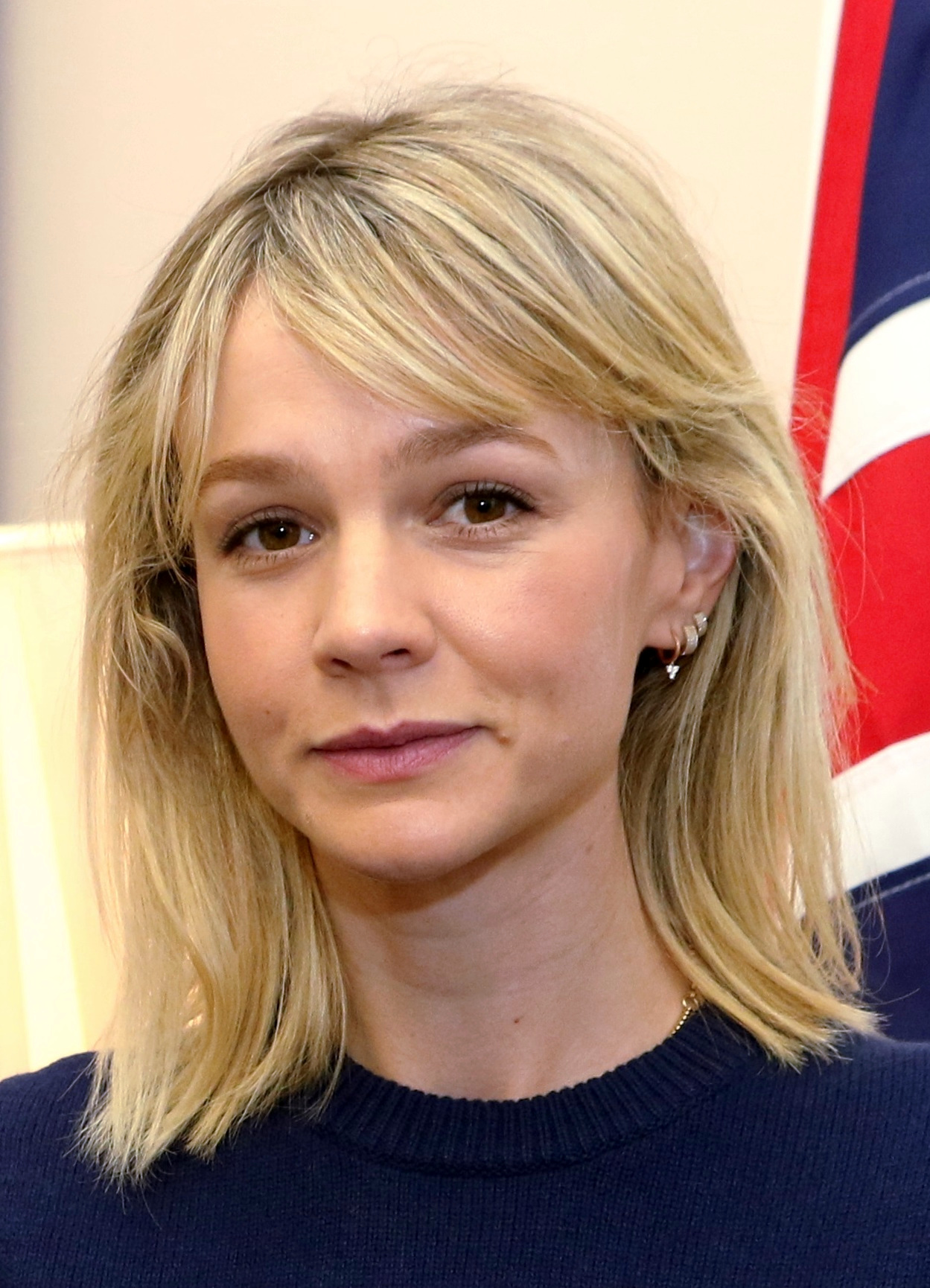
Carey Mulligan, Best Actress winner

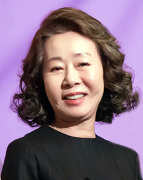
Youn Yuh-jung, Best Supporting Actress winner

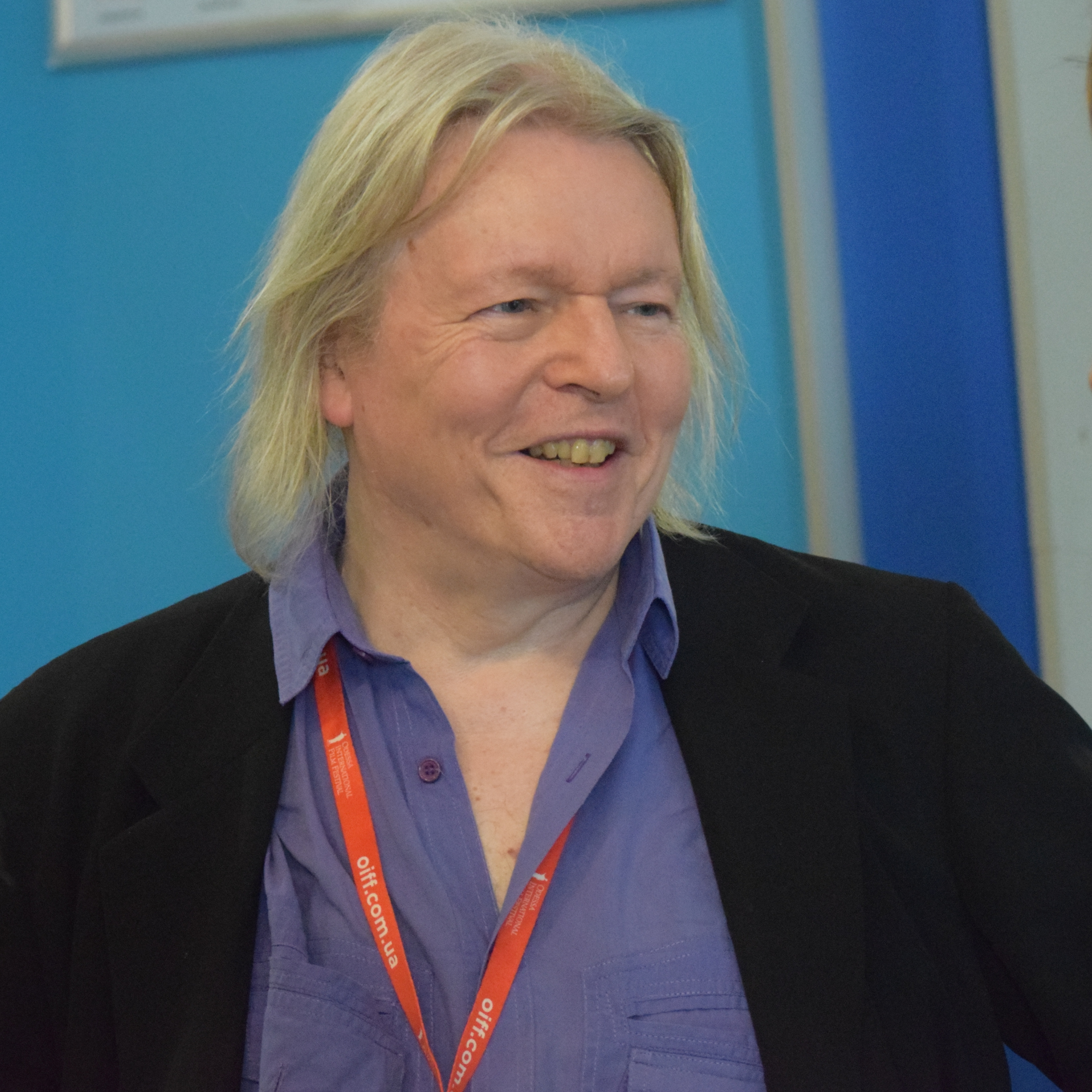
Christopher Hampton, Best Adapted Screenplay co-winner

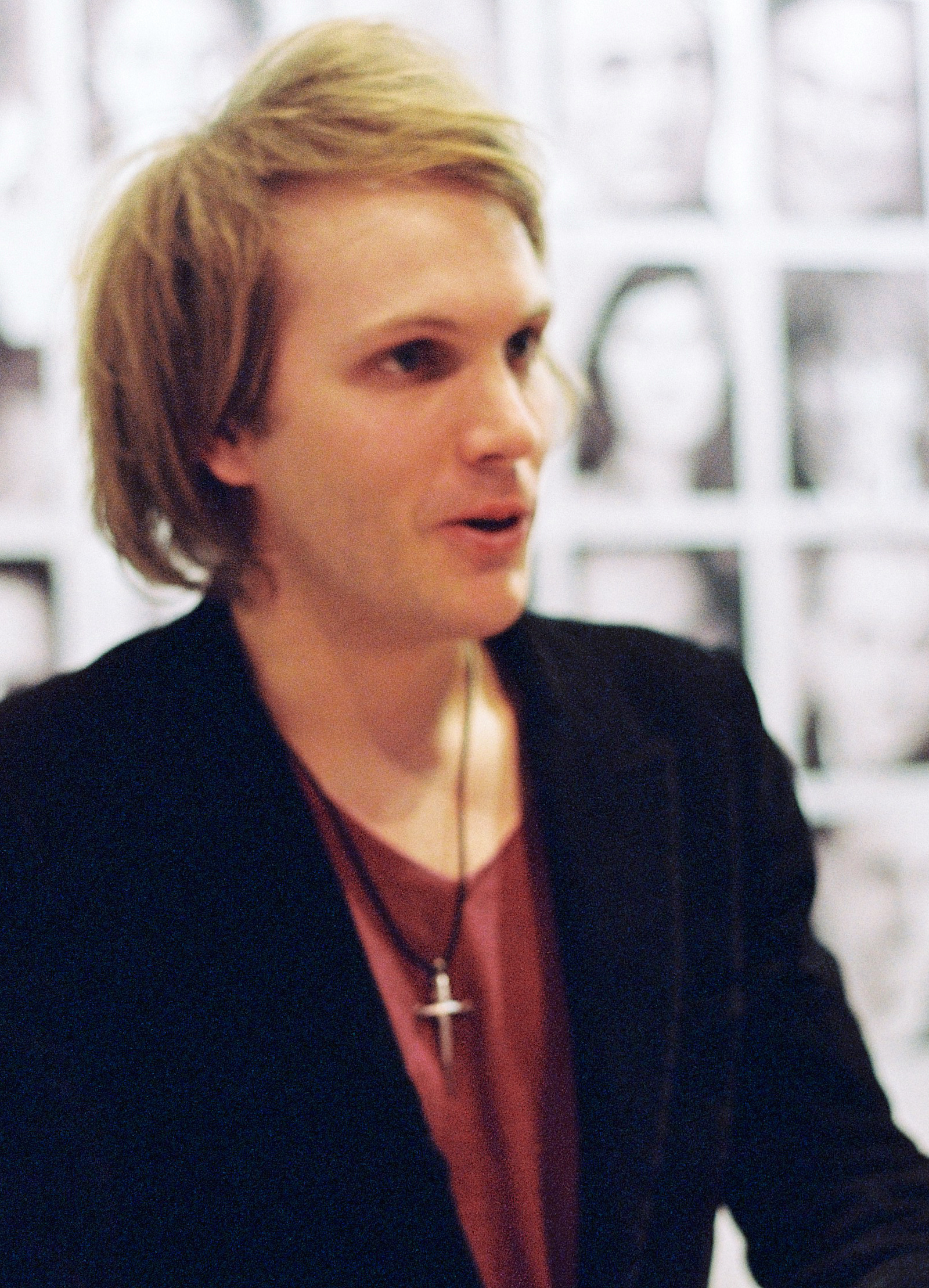
Florian Zeller, Best Adapted Screenplay co-winner

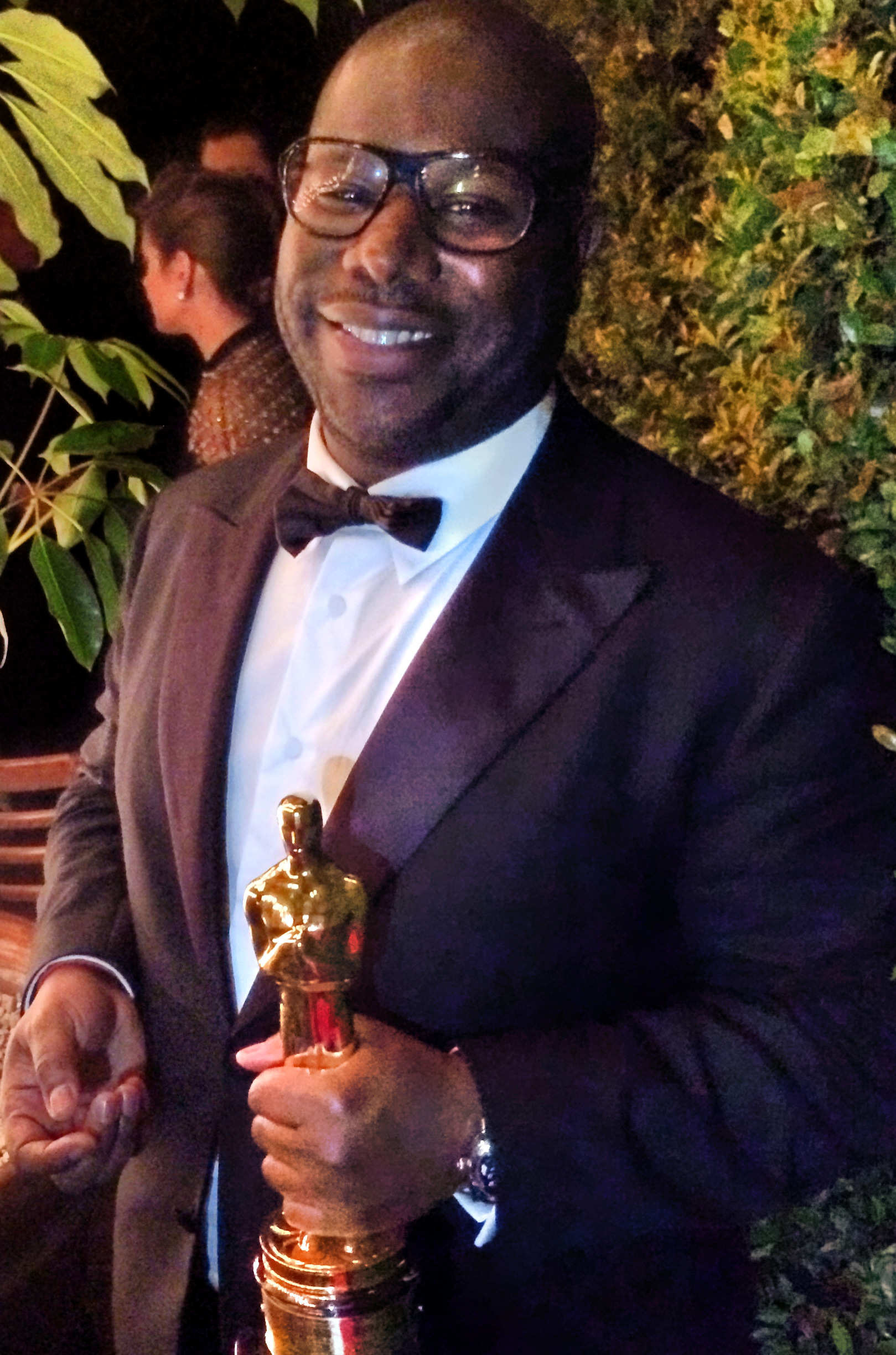
Steve McQueen, Best Body of Work winner

Best Picture	Best Director
**Promising Young Woman**: Runner-Up: Sound of Metal; Black Bear; First Cow; Nomadland; One Night in Miami...	**Chloé Zhao – Nomadland**: Runner-Up: Aaron Sorkin – The Trial of the Chicago 7; Darius Marder – Sound of Metal; Kelly Reichardt – First Cow; Florian Zeller – The Father
Best Actor	Best Actress
**Riz Ahmed – Sound of Metal**: Runner-Up: Anthony Hopkins – The Father; Chadwick Boseman – Ma Rainey's Black Bottom; Brian Dennehy – Driveways; Steven Yeun – Minari	**Carey Mulligan – Promising Young Woman**: Runner-Up: Frances McDormand – Nomadland; Viola Davis – Ma Rainey's Black Bottom; Vanessa Kirby – Pieces of a Woman; Aubrey Plaza – Black Bear
Best Supporting Actor	Best Supporting Actress
**Paul Raci – Sound of Metal**: Runner-Up: Peter Macdissi – Uncle Frank; Sacha Baron Cohen – The Trial of the Chicago 7; Frank Langella – The Trial of the Chicago 7; Bill Murray – On the Rocks	**Youn Yuh-jung – Minari**: Runner-Up: Amanda Seyfried – Mank; Maria Bakalova – Borat Subsequent Moviefilm; Ellen Burstyn – Pieces of a Woman; Olivia Cooke – Sound of Metal
Best Adapted Screenplay	Best Original Screenplay
**Christopher Hampton and Florian Zeller – The Father**: Runner-Up: Charlie Kaufman – I'm Thinking of Ending Things; Kelly Reichardt and Jonathan Raymond – First Cow; Ruben Santiago-Hudson – Ma Rainey's Black Bottom; Chloé Zhao – Nomadland	**Lee Isaac Chung – Minari**: Runner-Up: Emerald Fennell – Promising Young Woman; Runner-Up: Darius Marder, Abraham Marder, and Derek Cianfrance – Sound of Metal; Runner-Up: Aaron Sorkin – The Trial of the Chicago 7; Sofia Coppola – On the Rocks
Best Breakthrough Artist	Best Comedic Performance
**Radha Blank – The Forty-Year-Old Version**: Runner-Up: Riz Ahmed – Sound of Metal; Maria Bakalova – Borat Subsequent Moviefilm; Sidney Flanigan – Never Rarely Sometimes Always; Vanessa Kirby – Pieces of a Woman	**Radha Blank – The Forty-Year-Old Version**: Runner-Up: Maria Bakalova – Borat Subsequent Moviefilm; Runner-Up: Bill Murray – On the Rocks; Sacha Baron Cohen – Borat Subsequent Moviefilm; Andy Samberg – Palm Springs
Best Animated Film	Best Documentary
**Wolfwalkers**: Runner-Up: Over the Moon; Onward; Soul; Trolls World Tour	**Time**: Runner-Up: The Social Dilemma; Athlete A; My Octopus Teacher; Rewind
Best International Film	Best Ensemble
**The Life Ahead**: Runner-Up: The Platform; Another Round; Martin Eden; Sputnik	**One Night in Miami...**: Runner-Up: The Trial of the Chicago 7; Da 5 Bloods; Palm Springs; Uncle Frank
Best Cinematography	Best Editing
**Joshua James Richards – Nomadland**: Runner-Up: Erik Messerschmidt – Mank; Christopher Blauvelt – First Cow; Hoyte van Hoytema – Tenet; Dariusz Wolski – News of the World	**Andy Canny – The Invisible Man**: Runner-Up: Alan Baumgarten – The Trial of the Chicago 7; Andrew Dickler and Matthew Friedman – Palm Springs; Jennifer Lame – Tenet; Matthew L. Weiss – Black Bear
Best Costumes	Best Production Design
**Alexandra Byrne – Emma**: Runner-Up: Erin Benach – Birds of Prey; April Napier – First Cow; Ann Roth – Ma Rainey's Black Bottom; Trish Summerville – Mank	**Donald Graham Burt – Mank**: Runner-Up: Molly Hughes – I'm Thinking of Ending Things; Runner-Up: Shane Valentino – The Trial of the Chicago 7; Nathan Crowley – Tenet; Kave Quinn – Emma
Best Use of Music	Best Visual Effects
**Hamilton**: Runner-Up: David Byrne's American Utopia; Runner-Up: Ma Rainey's Black Bottom; Da 5 Bloods; Sound of Metal	**Tenet**: Runner-Up: The Invisible Man; Birds of Prey; Greyhound; The Midnight Sky; Sputnik
Best Body of Work
**Steve McQueen – The Small Axe film series (Mangrove, Lover's Rock, Red, White and Blue, Alex Wheatle, Education)**
