= Never Rarely Sometimes Always =

2020 drama film by Eliza Hittman

- Theatrical release poster
- Directed by: Eliza Hittman
- Written by: Eliza Hittman
- Produced by: Adele Romanski; Sara Murphy
- Starring: Sidney Flanigan; Talia Ryder; Théodore Pellerin; Ryan Eggold; Sharon Van Etten
- Cinematography: Hélène Louvart
- Edited by: Scott Cummings
- Music by: Julia Holter
- Production companies: Focus Features; BBC Films; Pastel Productions; Tango Entertainment; Mutressa Movies; Cinereach
- Distributed by: Focus Features (United States); Universal Pictures (international)
- Release dates: January 24, 2020 (Sundance); March 13, 2020 (United States)
- Running time: 101 minutes
- Countries: United States; United Kingdom
- Language: English
- Budget: <$5 million
- Box office: $891,527

Never Rarely Sometimes Always is a 2020 drama film written and directed by Eliza Hittman. It stars Sidney Flanigan (in her acting debut), Talia Ryder, Théodore Pellerin, Ryan Eggold, and Sharon Van Etten. It had its world premiere at the Sundance Film Festival on January 24, 2020. It was also selected to compete for the Golden Bear in the main competition section at the 70th Berlin International Film Festival, where it won the Silver Bear Grand Jury Prize. The film was released in the United States on March 13, 2020, by Focus Features. It received widespread acclaim from critics, with praise for Flanigan's performance and Hittman's direction and screenplay.

== Plot ==
Seventeen-year-old Autumn Callahan suspects she is pregnant and goes to a crisis pregnancy center. At the center, she takes a drugstore test that confirms she is pregnant. She is told she is 10 weeks along, given literature on adoption, and shown an anti-abortion video. After learning that she cannot get an abortion in Pennsylvania without parental consent, she tries to induce a miscarriage by swallowing pills and punching herself in the stomach. When those methods fail, she tells her cousin, Skylar, that she is pregnant. Skylar steals cash from the grocery store where they work, and the two buy bus tickets to New York City. On the bus they meet Jasper, a young man persistently interested in Skylar even though she tries to blow him off.

At a Planned Parenthood clinic in Brooklyn, Autumn learns that the crisis pregnancy center lied to her about how far along she was and that she is actually 18 weeks pregnant. Though she is still able to get an abortion, she must go to a Manhattan clinic the next morning to have it performed. Autumn and Skylar spend an uncomfortable night riding the subway and playing games at an arcade. The next morning at the clinic, Autumn learns that a second-trimester abortion is a two-day procedure and that paying for it will take most of her funds. The counselor also asks her a series of questions about her sexual partners that reveal that Autumn's partners have been physically and sexually abusive.

Out of money, Skylar realizes the two have no way of going home. As Autumn asks Skylar not to call either of their mothers, Skylar reaches out to Jasper, who takes them bowling and to karaoke. At the end of the night, Skylar asks Jasper to lend them money for their bus tickets, and he agrees. Skylar leaves with Jasper to find an ATM, and Autumn later goes looking for them. She finds them kissing. Realizing Skylar is only doing it for the loan, Autumn discreetly grabs Skylar's hand to comfort her.

In the morning, Autumn goes to her appointment and has the abortion. Autumn and Skylar go to a restaurant, where Skylar asks questions about the procedure, which Autumn answers tersely. The two ride a bus back to Pennsylvania.

== Cast ==
- Sidney Flanigan as Autumn Callahan
- Talia Ryder as Skylar
- Théodore Pellerin as Jasper
- Ryan Eggold as Ted
- Sharon Van Etten as Autumn's mother
- Kelly Chapman as Social Worker
- Kim Rios Lin as Anesthesiologist
- Drew Seltzer as Manager Rick
- Carolina Espiro as Financial Advisor

== Production ==
In April 2019, it was announced that Sidney Flanigan, Talia Ryder, Théodore Pellerin, Ryan Eggold and Sharon Van Etten had joined the cast of the film, with Eliza Hittman directing from a screenplay she wrote. Adele Romanski and Sara Murphy produced the film under their Pastel Productions banner, while Rose Garnett, Tim Headington, Elika Portnoy and Alex Orlovsky executive produced the film under their BBC Films and Tango Entertainment banners, respectively. Focus Features was slated to distribute.

The film was shot in New York City and Shamokin, Pennsylvania over 29 days in February and March 2019.

== Release ==
Never Rarely Sometimes Always had its world premiere at the Sundance Film Festival on January 24, 2020. It was released in the United States on March 13, 2020. Due to the COVID-19 pandemic, the film was released on video on demand on April 3, 2020. Focus debated re-releasing the film theatrically but was concerned about competition once theaters reopened. It was released through video on demand in the United Kingdom on May 13, 2020, after being initially planned for a theatrical release.

== Reception ==
=== Box office ===
In theaters, Never Rarely Sometimes Always grossed $891,527.

=== Critical response ===
On Rotten Tomatoes, the film holds an approval rating of 99% based on 238 reviews, with an average rating of 8.6/10. The site's critical consensus reads, "Powerfully acted and directed, Never Rarely Sometimes Always reaffirms writer-director Eliza Hittman as a filmmaker of uncommon sensitivity and grace." On Metacritic, the film has a weighted average score of 92 out of 100, based on 38 critics, indicating "universal acclaim".

Critics praised the film for its approach to visual storytelling and naturalistic acting, particularly its avoidance of polemic to focus on the lives of and the bond between its two lead characters. Justin Chang of the Los Angeles Times wrote, "What makes Never Rarely Sometimes Always so forceful—and certainly the most searingly confrontational American drama about abortion rights in recent memory—is its quality of understatement, its determination to build its argument not didactically but cinematically." Richard Lawson of Vanity Fair wrote, "It's rare that the topic of abortion gets such an empathetic and holistic film treatment: passionate but unsentimental, principled without any predetermined moral.” Chang concluded, "if the picture Hittman paints is stirringly bleak, it is not without its passages of tentative hope, even grace."

Karen Han of Polygon wrote, "The slow build-up—and Autumn and Skylar's stoicism through it all—makes it all the more affecting when the reasoning behind the film's title is revealed." Naomi Fry of The New Yorker wrote, "In its profound sensitivity to everyday detail, Never Rarely Sometimes Always makes the viewer aware of the mundane challenges that dog every step its heroines manage to take along that path—from the large, cheap suitcase bumped along with difficulty on subway steps, to the dwindling-down-to-nothing funds in a secreted-away pouch, to the flutter-lidded, late-night dozes taken on the subway, in lieu of a place to stay, waiting out the hours."

Critic Mark Kermode gave the film a 5-star rating and wrote, "Perfectly pitched and sensitively played, this is truthful, powerful and profoundly moving fare from a film-maker at the very top of her game" and added the film "is perhaps best described as a perfectly observed portrait of female friendship; a coming-of-age story with road-movie inflections, piercingly honest and deeply affecting." Kermode also lauded cinematographer Hélène Louvart, "who here manages to capture moments of intense intimacy in unobtrusive fashion. Through her camera, we become both observers and participants—watching these young women's lives but also empathetically experiencing their shared journeys."

In 2023, it ranked 42nd on The Hollywood Reporter's list of "The 50 Best Movies of the 21st Century So Far". The Reporter wrote that while the COVID-19 pandemic affected the film's theatrical release, its artistic impact on independent cinema prevailed, its relevance and resonance still enduring even after the U.S. Supreme Court overturned Roe v. Wade and Planned Parenthood v. Casey. It also ranked 15th on Collider's list of "The 20 Best Drama Movies of the 2020s So Far". Collider called it "one of the most excruciating viewings of the decade". In 2024, Looper ranked it number 15 on its list of the "50 Best PG-13 Movies of All Time," writing "The thoughtful camerawork lends insight to the quiet, complicated world of the film's lead character, with the emotionally immersive nature of the piece managing to make something as simple as hands touching into something that tugs at your soul." In June 2025, IndieWire ranked the film at number 20 on its list of "The 100 Best Movies of the 2020s (So Far)."

== Accolades ==
Award	Date of ceremony	Category	Recipient(s)	Result	Ref.
Sundance Film Festival	February 1, 2020	U.S. Dramatic Special Jury Award: Neo-Realism	Eliza Hittman	Won	
Sundance Film Festival	February 1, 2020	U.S. Dramatic Competition Grand Jury Prize	Eliza Hittman	Nominated	
Berlin International Film Festival	March 1, 2020	Golden Bear	Eliza Hittman	Nominated	
Berlin International Film Festival	March 1, 2020	Silver Bear Grand Jury Prize	Eliza Hittman	Won	
Hollywood Critics Association Midseason Awards	July 2, 2020	Best Picture	Never Rarely Sometimes Always	Nominated	
Hollywood Critics Association Midseason Awards	July 2, 2020	Best Actress	Sidney Flanigan	Nominated	
Hollywood Critics Association Midseason Awards	July 2, 2020	Best Female Director	Eliza Hittman	Nominated	
Hollywood Critics Association Midseason Awards	July 2, 2020	Best Original Screenplay	Eliza Hittman	Nominated	
Boston Society of Film Critics Awards	December 13, 2020	Best Actress	Sidney Flanigan	Won	
IndieWire Critics Poll	December 14, 2020	Best Film	Never Rarely Sometimes Always	Runner-up	
IndieWire Critics Poll	December 14, 2020	Best Director	Eliza Hittman	3rd Place	
IndieWire Critics Poll	December 14, 2020	Best Cinematography	Hélène Louvart	5th Place	
IndieWire Critics Poll	December 14, 2020	Best Screenplay	Eliza Hittman	3rd Place	
New York Film Critics Circle Awards	December 18, 2020	Best Actress	Sidney Flanigan	Won	
New York Film Critics Circle Awards	December 18, 2020	Best Screenplay	Eliza Hittman	Won	
Los Angeles Film Critics Association	December 20, 2020	Best Screenplay	Eliza Hittman	Runner-up	
Florida Film Critics Circle	December 21, 2020	Breakout Award	Sidney Flanigan	Won	
Chicago Film Critics Association	December 21, 2020	Most Promising Performer	Sidney Flanigan	Won	
Chicago Film Critics Association	December 21, 2020	Best Original Screenplay	Eliza Hittman	Won	
Alliance of Women Film Journalists	January 4, 2021	Best Film	Never Rarely Sometimes Always	Nominated	
Alliance of Women Film Journalists	January 4, 2021	Best Woman Director	Eliza Hittman	Nominated	
Alliance of Women Film Journalists	January 4, 2021	Best Woman's Screenwriter	Eliza Hittman	Nominated	
Alliance of Women Film Journalists	January 4, 2021	Best Woman's Breakthrough Performance	Sidney Flanigan	Won	
National Society of Film Critics	January 9, 2021	Best Actress	Sidney Flanigan	3rd Place	
National Society of Film Critics	January 9, 2021	Best Screenplay	Eliza Hittman	Won	
National Society of Film Critics	January 9, 2021	Best Film	Never Rarely Sometimes Always	3rd Place	
San Diego Film Critics Society Awards	January 11, 2021	Breakthrough Artist	Sidney Flanigan	Nominated	
Gotham Awards	January 11, 2021	Best Feature	Never Rarely Sometimes Always	Nominated	
Gotham Awards	January 11, 2021	Breakthrough Actor	Sidney Flanigan	Nominated	
St. Louis Film Critics Association Awards	January 17, 2021	Best Scene	Never Rarely Sometimes Always	Nominated	
San Francisco Bay Area Film Critics Circle	January 18, 2021	Best Picture	Never Rarely Sometimes Always	Nominated	
San Francisco Bay Area Film Critics Circle	January 18, 2021	Best Director	Eliza Hittman	Nominated	
San Francisco Bay Area Film Critics Circle	January 18, 2021	Best Original Screenplay	Eliza Hittman	Nominated	
San Francisco Bay Area Film Critics Circle	January 18, 2021	Best Actress	Sidney Flanigan	Nominated	
Houston Film Critics Society	January 18, 2021	Best Picture	Never Rarely Sometimes Always	Nominated	
Houston Film Critics Society	January 18, 2021	Best Performance by an Actress in a Leading Role	Sidney Flanigan	Nominated	
Online Film Critics Society	January 25, 2021	Best Picture	Never Rarely Sometimes Always	4th Place	
Online Film Critics Society	January 25, 2021	Best Director	Eliza Hittman	Nominated	
Online Film Critics Society	January 25, 2021	Best Actress	Sidney Flanigan	Nominated	
Online Film Critics Society	January 25, 2021	Best Supporting Actress	Talia Ryder	Nominated	
Online Film Critics Society	January 25, 2021	Best Original Screenplay	Eliza Hittman	Nominated	
National Board of Review	January 26, 2021	Top 10 Independent Films	Never Rarely Sometimes Always	Won	
National Board of Review	January 26, 2021	Breakthrough Performance	Sidney Flanigan	Won	
New York Film Critics Online	January 26, 2021	Top 10 Films	Never Rarely Sometimes Always	Won	
Hollywood Music in Media Awards	January 27, 2021	Best Original Song in an Independent Film	Sharon Van Etten (for "Staring At A Mountain")	Nominated	
Washington D.C. Area Film Critics Association	February 8, 2021	Best Youth Performance	Sidney Flanigan	Nominated	
Washington D.C. Area Film Critics Association	February 8, 2021	Best Youth Performance	Talia Ryder	Nominated	
Seattle Film Critics Association Awards	February 15, 2021	Best Picture	Never Rarely Sometimes Always	Nominated	
Seattle Film Critics Association Awards	February 15, 2021	Best Actress in a Leading Role	Sidney Flanigan	Nominated	
Seattle Film Critics Association Awards	February 15, 2021	Best Actress in a Supporting Role	Talia Ryder	Nominated	
Seattle Film Critics Association Awards	February 15, 2021	Best Youth Performance	Talia Ryder	Nominated	
British Independent Film Awards	February 18, 2021	Best International Independent Film	Never Rarely Sometimes Always	Nominated	
International Cinephile Society	February 20, 2021	Best Picture	Never Rarely Sometimes Always	11th Place	
International Cinephile Society	February 20, 2021	Best Actress	Sidney Flanigan	Nominated	
International Cinephile Society	February 20, 2021	Best Supporting Actress	Talia Ryder	Nominated	
International Cinephile Society	February 20, 2021	Best Original Screenplay	Eliza Hittman	Nominated	
Hollywood Critics Association	March 5, 2021	Standout Performance by an Actor or Actress 23 or Under	Sidney Flanigan	Won	
Hollywood Critics Association	March 5, 2021	Best Female Director	Eliza Hittman	Nominated	
Critics' Choice Movie Awards	March 7, 2021	Best Actress	Sidney Flanigan	Nominated	
Critics' Choice Movie Awards	March 7, 2021	Best Young Actor/Actress	Talia Ryder	Nominated	
Critics' Choice Movie Awards	March 7, 2021	Best Original Screenplay	Eliza Hittman	Nominated	
Women Film Critics Circle	March 7, 2021	Best Movie About Women	Never Rarely Sometimes Always	Runner-up	
Women Film Critics Circle	March 7, 2021	Best Movie By A Woman	Never Rarely Sometimes Always	Nominated	
Women Film Critics Circle	March 7, 2021	Best Woman Storyteller (Screenwriting Award)	Eliza Hittman	Won	
Women Film Critics Circle	March 7, 2021	Courage in Filmmaking	Eliza Hittman	Runner-up	
Georgia Film Critics Association	March 12, 2021	Best Actress	Sidney Flanigan	Nominated	
Georgia Film Critics Association	March 12, 2021	Breakthrough Award	Sidney Flanigan	Nominated	
Austin Film Critics Association	March 19, 2021	Best Film	Never Rarely Sometimes Always	5th Place	
Austin Film Critics Association	March 19, 2021	Best Director	Eliza Hittman	Nominated	
Austin Film Critics Association	March 19, 2021	The Robert R. “Bobby” McCurdy Memorial Breakthrough Artist Award	Sidney Flanigan	Nominated	
Dorian Awards	April 18, 2021	Best Screenplay	Eliza Hittman	Nominated	
Dorian Awards	April 18, 2021	Best Unsung Film	Never Rarely Sometimes Always	Nominated	
Dorian Awards	April 18, 2021	Best Film Performance — Actress	Sidney Flanigan	Nominated	
Dorian Awards	April 18, 2021	“We’re Wilde About You!” Rising Star Award	Sidney Flanigan	Nominated	
Film Independent Spirit Awards	April 22, 2021	Best Feature	Adele Romanski and Sara Murphy	Nominated	
Film Independent Spirit Awards	April 22, 2021	Best Director	Eliza Hittman	Nominated	
Film Independent Spirit Awards	April 22, 2021	Best Female Lead	Sidney Flanigan	Nominated	
Film Independent Spirit Awards	April 22, 2021	Best Supporting Female	Talia Ryder	Nominated	
Film Independent Spirit Awards	April 22, 2021	Best Screenplay	Eliza Hittman	Nominated	
Film Independent Spirit Awards	April 22, 2021	Best Cinematography	Hélène Louvart	Nominated	
Film Independent Spirit Awards	April 22, 2021	Best Editing	Scott Cummings	Nominated	
Gold Derby Awards	N/A	Best Picture	Never Rarely Sometimes Always	Nominated	
Gold Derby Awards	N/A	Best Actress	Sidney Flanigan	Nominated	
Gold Derby Awards	N/A	Best Original Screenplay	Eliza Hittman	Nominated	
Gold Derby Awards	N/A	Best Breakthrough Performer	Sidney Flanigan	Nominated	
