= Eliza Hittman =

American film director

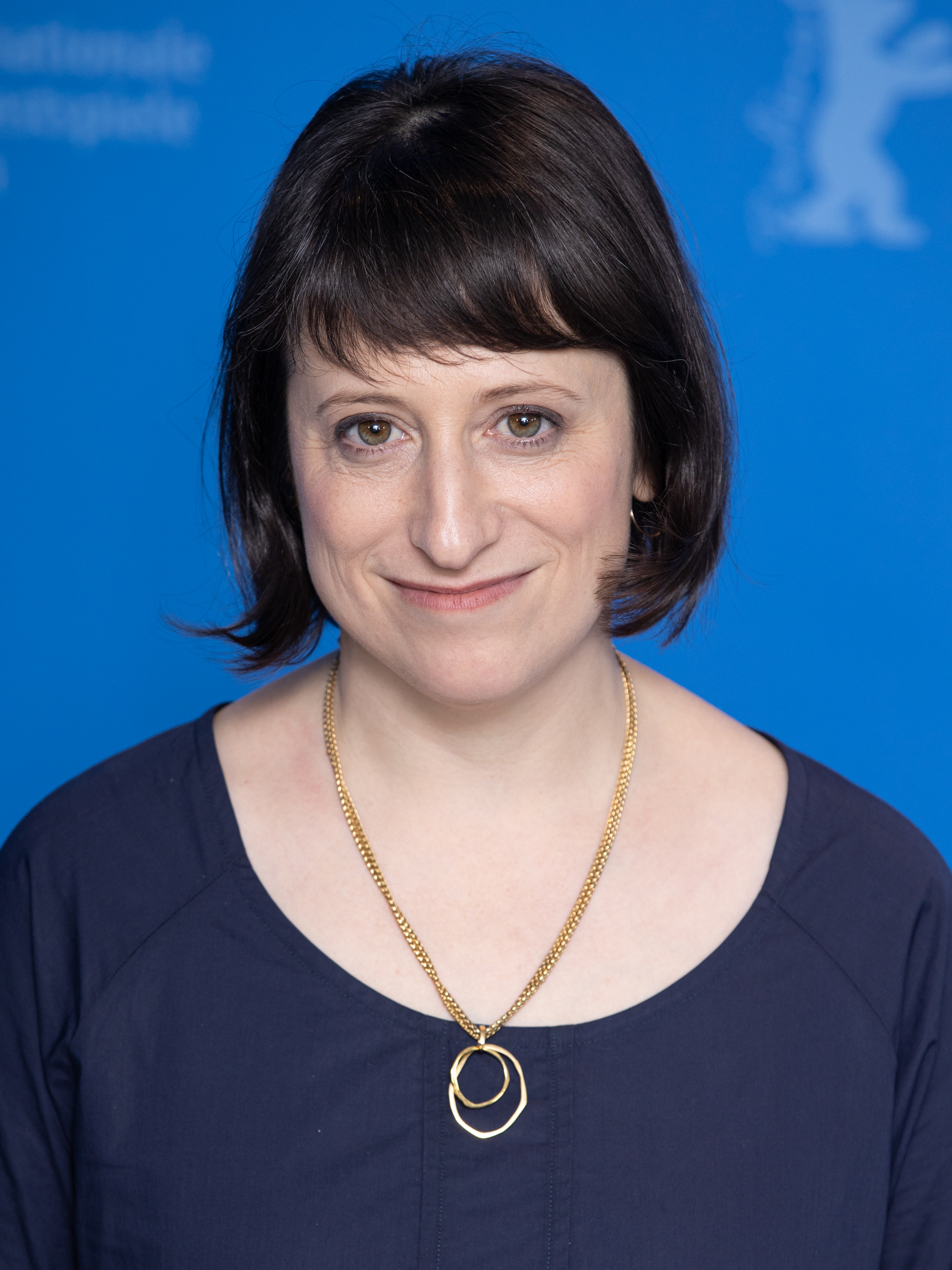
- Hittman at the 2020 Berlin International Film Festival
- Born: December 9, 1979 (age 46); New York City, U.S.
- Education: Indiana University Bloomington; California Institute of the Arts
- Occupation: Filmmaker
- Years active: 2008–present

Eliza Hittman (born December 9, 1979) is an American screenwriter, film director, and producer from New York City. She has won multiple awards for her film Never Rarely Sometimes Always, which include the New York Film Critics Circle Award and the National Society of Film Critics Award—both for best screenplay.

== Early life ==
Hittman was born and raised in Flatbush, Brooklyn. She attended Edward R. Murrow High School in Brooklyn, where she was a theater buff. She graduated from Indiana University Bloomington in 2001 with a BA in theater and drama, but later went on to study art and film, and in 2010 received her MFA from the School of Film/Video at California Institute of the Arts. Hittman is Jewish.

In between the time of her BA and MFA, Hittman staged plays back in New York City. She didn’t see a future or career in theater. This jump to film is what ultimately led her to California Institute of the Arts.

While at the California Institute of the arts, she met her partner Scott Cummings. They share a child, born circa 2014.

== Career ==
In 2010, Hittman wrote and directed a short film while in graduate school titled, Second Cousins Once Removed. This short film premiered at Oberhausen festival in Germany, and was the first film she ever submitted to any festival.

Her short film Forever's Gonna Start Tonight premiered at the 2011 Sundance Film Festival and was on Indiewire's "The Best of the Best" list.

Hittman's first feature film, It Felt Like Love, premiered at the 2013 Sundance Film Festival and opened at the IFC Center in New York in March 2014. It has received positive reviews, with a score of 84% on Rotten Tomatoes. It was a Critic's Pick of both The New York Times and the Village Voice. She was named one of Filmmaker Magazine's 25 New Faces of Indie Film in 2013.

Her second film Beach Rats, starring Harris Dickinson, was selected for the 2015 Sundance Screenwriter's Lab, had its world premiere at the 2017 Sundance Film Festival on January 23, 2017, where she won the Directing Award and was acquired by Neon. The film had its international premier at Locarno in the Golden Leopard Competition. It also won the Artios Award for Outstanding Achievement in Casting, Outstanding Screenwriting in a U.S. Feature at Outfest, and the London Critics’ Circle Film Award for Young British/Irish Performer of the Year.

Her third film, Never Rarely Sometimes Always, starring Sidney Flanigan, is about a teenager in rural Pennsylvania who travels to New York City with her cousin to access an abortion for an unwanted pregnancy. It premiered at the 2020 Sundance Film Festival, where it won a Special Jury Award for Neo-Realism. The film was also selected to compete for the Golden Bear in the main competition section at the 70th Berlin International Film Festival and won Silver Bear Grand Jury Prize, the second most prestigious prize at the festival. The film was also nominated for seven Independent Spirit Awards as well as winning New York Critics Circle Awards for Best Screenplay and Best Actress. In a 2020 interview with FF2 Media, Hittman explains the balance she struck between documentary cinema vérité and narrative: "Planned Parenthood read drafts, gave me access to people to interview, and allowed us to shoot in their facility. It was a balance, I think, because obviously, I'm not a documentary filmmaker. The film is ultimately a character study. I really tried to absorb as much perspective and information as I could but then sort of shape it into a unique fictional story."

As far as future work, in an interview from 2020, Hittman says she has "something simmering inside my head."

Hittman served as director and executive producer of multiple episodes of the upcoming Peacock true crime miniseries A Friend of the Family based on the kidnapping of Jan Broberg.

Hittman currently works at Pratt Institute as an assistant professor in the Film/Video Department for the School of Art.

== Style and themes ==
Hittman has been noted to make films that surround teen sexuality and female hardships. Her first feature film It Felt Like Love centers on the sexual awakening of a young teenage girl, and her impatience to grow up. Her second film Beach Rats is a story that highlights the idea of masculinity in young men and their sexual interests. Her most recent film, Never Rarely Sometimes Always, follows a teenaged girl as she travels from Pennsylvania to New York City with her cousin in search of an abortion.

In terms of visuals, Hittman’s camera work tends to frame the characters very closely, usually in long takes.

== Filmography ==
Short film

Year	Title	Director	Producer	Writer	Notes
2010	Second Cousins Once Removed	Yes	Yes	Yes	
2011	Forever's Gonna Start Tonight	Yes	Yes	Yes	
2014	Buffalo Juggalos	No	Yes	No	Documentary Short

Feature film

Year	Title	Director	Writer	Producer
2013	It Felt Like Love	Yes	Yes	Yes
2017	Beach Rats	Yes	Yes	No
2020	Never Rarely Sometimes Always	Yes	Yes	No

Television

Year	Title	Director	Executive Producer	Writer	Notes
2018	High Maintenance	Yes	No	Yes	2 episodes
2018	13 Reasons Why	Yes	No	No	2 episodes
2022	A Friend of the Family	Yes	Yes	No	2 episodes

== Accolades ==
In 2014, for It Felt Like Love, she was nominated for the Bingham Ray Breakthrough Director Award, and for the John Cassavetes Spirit Award.

With her sophomore film, Beach Rats, in 2017 Hittman won the Directing Award: Dramatic at the Sundance Film Festival, Best Screenwriting in a U.S. Feature at Outfest, the Grand Jury Prize at the Independent Film Festival Boston, and the Future/Now Prize at the Montclair Film Festival. Beach Rats was nominated for several more awards during its premiere season.

In 2017, Beach Rats premiered in the US Dramatic Competition at the 2017 Sundance Film Festival, where she won the Directing Award, and internationally premiered at Locarno in the Golden Leopard Competition and was the Centerpiece Film at New Directors / New Films. In 2018, it was nominated for Best Cinematography and Best Male Lead at the Independent Spirit awards and a Breakthrough Actor Award for the Gothams Awards.

Beach Rats was also the winner of the Best Narrative Film at the 2017 Independent Film Festival of Boston, the Best Feature Film at the 2017 Hamburg Film Festival, and the Outstanding Screenwriting in a U.S. Feature at the L.A. Outfest Awards.. This film was very accomplished in 2017.

She was a recipient of a Guggenheim Fellowship for film-video in 2018.

In 2020, Hittman was nominated for and won the New York Film Critics Circle Award for Best Screenplay for Never Rarely Sometimes Always. She also won the National Society of Film Critics Award for Best Screenplay.

In 2021, she was selected as Jury President for International competition section of 74th Locarno Film Festival held from 4 to 14 August.

== See also ==
- List of female film and television directors
- List of LGBT-related films directed by women
