= Showing Up =

2022 film by Kelly Reichardt

- Theatrical release poster
- Directed by: Kelly Reichardt
- Written by: Jon Raymond; Kelly Reichardt
- Produced by: Neil Kopp; Vincent Savino; Anish Savjani
- Starring: Michelle Williams; Hong Chau; Maryann Plunkett; John Magaro; André Benjamin; James Le Gros; Judd Hirsch
- Cinematography: Christopher Blauvelt
- Edited by: Kelly Reichardt
- Music by: Ethan Rose
- Production company: Filmscience
- Distributed by: A24
- Release dates: May 27, 2022 (Cannes); April 7, 2023 (United States)
- Running time: 108 minutes
- Country: United States
- Language: English
- Box office: $1.2 million

Showing Up is a 2022 American comedy-drama film co-written and directed by Kelly Reichardt. Michelle Williams stars as a sculptor managing the competing attentions of her art, job, family, and friendships. The film marks the fourth collaboration between Reichardt and Williams.

Showing Up had its world premiere on May 27, 2022, at the Cannes Film Festival. It was released theatrically in the United States by A24 a year later, on April 7, 2023. Showing Up received largely positive reviews, with particular praise for Williams' performance and Reichardt's direction. It was named one of the top 10 independent films of 2023 by the National Board of Review. In 2024, the film received the Robert Altman Award at the 39th Independent Spirit Awards.

== Plot ==
Lizzy is a sculptor and arts administrator assistant for her mother at her alma mater, the Oregon College of Art and Craft. She is also working on a showing of her work, clay sculptures of women in joyful or anguished movement.

Lizzy's landlord and neighbor Jo, a rival artist, frequently spars with her. For days, Lizzy is continuously reminding Jo to fix Lizzy's water heater, but Jo prioritizes everything else, like hanging a tire swing in the backyard and her two upcoming shows. To have enough time to finish her sculptures, Lizzy takes Tuesday off from work. In the middle of the night, Lizzy's cat maims a pigeon that flew into the house. Lizzy throws the pigeon outside, but Jo discovers and rescues it the next morning, before dumping the work of taking care of it on Lizzy. Lizzy is at first actively resentful before she begins to bond with the bird. She ends up taking it to the vet, which costs her $150. When Jo finally comes for the bird, Lizzy lets her know it distracted her and kept her from her glazing.

Lizzy visits her father at home. She does not trust the hippies who have invited themselves to stay with him, who are more grifters than friends. Lizzy discovers that he has not had contact with her brother Sean for six months. Concerned, Lizzy goes to see Sean. He has become reclusive, and is delusional, convinced that his neighbors are behind his TV antenna not working. Contacting their mother about it, Lizzy believes her brother needs more than just emotional help, but is told he is simply a misunderstood genius.

The weekend right before her show, Lizzy's final piece burns on one side in the kiln. Visiting Sean, he is digging a massive pit in his backyard and insists he is hearing voices, which Lizzy and others choose not to hear. She convinces her mother to come watch him. Lizzy's mother puts Sean to sleep after he suffers the mental episode. Although it was arranged that he would come to the show, when she arrives he is not there. Lizzy is nervous, hearing that he has wandered off alone.

At Lizzy's show, her family shows up, even Sean, having taken the bus. Jo comes and brings the pigeon. It has its bandages removed by two unsupervised girls. Everyone watches as Sean releases the bird and it flies away. Jo and Lizzy go looking for it, but eventually accept it was ready to fly.

== Cast ==
- Michelle Williams as Lizzy
- Hong Chau as Jo
- Maryann Plunkett as Jean
- John Magaro as Sean
- André Benjamin as Eric
- Amanda Plummer as Dorothy
- Matt Malloy as Lee
- Heather Lawless as Marlene
- James Le Gros as Ira
- Denzel Rodriguez as William
- Judd Hirsch as Bill
- Lauren Lakis as Terri
- Jean-Luc Boucherot as Peter
- Ted Rooney as Ted
- Ben Coonley as Ben
- Chase Hawkins as Alex
- Izabel Mar as Maya

== Production ==
On January 26, 2021, it was announced that Michelle Williams would star in Showing Up, in her fourth collaboration with writer-director Kelly Reichardt after Wendy and Lucy, Meek's Cutoff, and Certain Women. In June 2021, Hong Chau, Judd Hirsch, Maryann Plunkett, John Magaro, André Benjamin, Heather Lawless, Amanda Plummer, Larry Fessenden, and James Le Gros joined the cast. Principal photography began on June 7, 2021, and concluded on July 15, 2021, in Portland, Oregon. Portland-based artist Cynthia Lahti created Lizzy's sculptures and drawings which feature prominently throughout the film.

The project was originally conceived as a biopic of Canadian artist Emily Carr and the 10 years she spent as a landlord hoping it would offer her more free time to work on her art, but instead forced her to paint less. Reichardt said the film officially pivoted away from Carr when she first embarked to Canada to research for the film and "the passport guy asked us what we were doing, and we said, 'We're coming to research a painter named Emily Carr.' And he goes, 'Oh yeah. We learned about her.' That took the wind out of our sails, that she was so famous."

== Reception ==
=== Critical response ===
On the review aggregator website Rotten Tomatoes, 88% of 165 critics' reviews are positive, with an average rating of 7.4/10. The website's consensus reads: "A deceptively simple drama about the artist's life, Showing Up reunites Kelly Reichardt and Michelle Williams to absorbing effect." Metacritic, which uses a weighted average, assigned the film a score of 86 out of 100, based on 38 critics, indicating "universal acclaim".

Showing Up was ranked tenth on Cahiers du Cinéma's top 10 films of 2023 list, tied with A Prince.

=== Accolades ===
Awards and nominations for Showing Up
Award	Date of ceremony	Category	Recipient(s)	Result	Ref.
Cannes Film Festival	May 17–28, 2022	Palme d'Or	Kelly Reichardt	Nominated	
Chlotrudis Awards	March 17, 2024	Best Performance in a Supporting Role	Hong Chau	Nominated	
Gotham Awards	November 27, 2023	Best Feature	Showing Up	Nominated	
Gotham Awards	November 27, 2023	Lead Performance	Michelle Williams	Nominated	
Independent Spirit Awards	February 25, 2024	Robert Altman Award	Kelly Reichardt, Gayle Keller & Ensemble Cast (Note: Given to one film’s director, casting director and ensemble cast. Ensemble cast include: André Benjamin, Hong Chau, Judd Hirsch, Heather Lawless, James Le Gros, John Magaro, Matt Malloy, Amanda Plummer, Maryann Plunkett, Denzel Rodriguez, Michelle Williams.)	Won	
International Cinephile Society	February 12, 2023	Best Picture	Showing Up	19th place	
International Cinephile Society	February 12, 2023	Best Supporting Actress	Hong Chau	Nominated	
National Board of Review	December 6, 2023	Top 10 Independent Films	Showing Up	Won (Note: This award does not have a single winner, but recognizes multiple films.)	
Seattle Film Critics Society	January 8, 2024	Pacific Northwest Filmmaking	Kelly Reichardt	Won	
