= Gotham Independent Film Awards 2020 =

Awards ceremony

30th Annual Gotham Independent Film Awards
- Date: January 11, 2021
- Country: United States
- Presented by: Independent Filmmaker Project

Highlights
- Most wins: Nomadland (2)
- Most nominations: First Cow (5)
- Best Feature: Nomadland
- Breakthrough Director: Andrew Patterson – The Vast of Night
- Website: https://gotham.ifp.org

The 30th Annual Gotham Independent Film Awards, presented by the Independent Filmmaker Project, were held on January 11, 2021. The nominations were announced on November 12, 2020. Actors Chadwick Boseman and Viola Davis, director Steve McQueen, writer Ryan Murphy, and the cast of The Trial of the Chicago 7 received tribute awards.

The awards honored the best independent filmmaking released between January 2020 and February 2021. Originally scheduled to take place on November 20, 2020, the ceremony was pushed back by two months due to the coronavirus pandemic.

== Ceremony information ==
Originally scheduled to take place in November 2020, the ceremony was pushed back due to the coronavirus pandemic. The eligibility period for releases was extended to include films released between January 1 and February 28, 2021. Films that were scheduled to release theatrically, but had to be released via VOD, are also eligible for the awards. The submission deadline for films was on October 1, 2020. To be eligible for the film awards, the films must be over 70 minutes, have a budget of under $35 million and must have been written, directed, and produced by a United States citizen (except for films qualifying for the Best International Feature category).

== Winners and nominees ==
=== Film ===
Best Feature: Nomadland; The Assistant; First Cow; Never Rarely Sometimes Always; Relic	Best Screenplay: Radha Blank – The Forty-Year-Old Version (TIE); Dan Sallitt – Fourteen (TIE); Mike Makowsky – Bad Education; Jon Raymond and Kelly Reichardt – First Cow; James Montague and Craig W. Sander – The Vast of Night
Best Documentary Feature: A Thousand Cuts (TIE); Time (TIE); 76 Days; City Hall; Our Time Machine	Best International Feature: Identifying Features; Bacurau; Beanpole; Cuties; Martin Eden; Wolfwalkers
Breakthrough Director: Andrew Patterson – The Vast of Night; Radha Blank – The Forty-Year-Old Version; Channing Godfrey Peoples – Miss Juneteenth; Carlo Mirabella-Davis – Swallow; Alex Thompson – Saint Frances	Breakthrough Actor: Kingsley Ben-Adir – One Night in Miami... as Malcolm X; Jasmine Batchelor – The Surrogate as Jess Harris; Sidney Flanigan – Never Rarely Sometimes Always as Autumn Callahan; Orion Lee – First Cow as King-Lu; Kelly O'Sullivan – Saint Frances as Bridget
Best Actor: Riz Ahmed – Sound of Metal as Ruben Stone; Chadwick Boseman (posthumously) – Ma Rainey's Black Bottom as Levee; Jude Law – The Nest as Rory O'Hara; John Magaro – First Cow as Otis "Cookie" Figowitz; Jesse Plemons – I'm Thinking of Ending Things as Jake	Best Actress: Nicole Beharie – Miss Juneteenth as Turquoise Jones; Jessie Buckley – I'm Thinking of Ending Things as Young Woman; Carrie Coon – The Nest as Allison O'Hara; Frances McDormand – Nomadland as Fern; Yuh-jung Youn – Minari as Soon-ja
Audience Award: Nomadland; 76 Days; The Assistant; Bacurau; Beanpole; City Hall; Cuties; First Cow; The Forty-Year-Old Version; Identifying Features; Martin Eden; Miss Juneteenth; Never Rarely Sometimes Always; Our Time Machine; Relic; Saint Frances; Swallow; A Thousand Cuts; Time; The Vast of Night; Wolfwalkers

=== Television ===
Breakthrough Series – Long Form: Watchmen; The Great; Immigration Nation; P-Valley; Unorthodox	Breakthrough Series – Short Form: I May Destroy You; Betty; Dave; Taste the Nation with Padma Lakshmi; Work in Progress

== Special awards ==
=== Ensemble Tribute ===
- The Trial of the Chicago 7 – Yahya Abdul-Mateen II, Sacha Baron Cohen, Caitlin FitzGerald, Joseph Gordon-Levitt, Kelvin Harrison Jr., Michael Keaton, Alice Kremelberg, Frank Langella, Eddie Redmayne, Mark Rylance, Ben Shenkman and Jeremy Strong

=== Made in NY Award ===
- Jeffrey Wright

=== Gotham Tributes ===
- Chadwick Boseman (posthumously)
- Viola Davis
- Steve McQueen
- Ryan Murphy
