= Gotham Independent Film Award for Best Feature =

Independent film award first distributed in 2004

- Country: United States
- Presented by: The Gotham Film & Media Institute
- First award: 2004
- Currently held by: One Battle After Another (2025)
- Website: awards.thegotham.org

The Gotham Independent Film Award for Best Feature is one of the annual Gotham Independent Film Awards and was first awarded in 2004 with Alexander Payne's Sideways being the first recipient of the award.

== Winners and nominees ==
=== 2000s ===
Year	Film	Distributing company(s)	Director(s)	Ref.
2004	Sideways	Fox Searchlight Pictures	Alexander Payne	
2004	Before Sunset	Warner Independent Pictures	Richard Linklater	
2004	Eternal Sunshine of the Spotless Mind	Focus Features	Michel Gondry	
2004	I Heart Huckabees	Fox Searchlight Pictures	David O. Russell	
2004	Primer	TH!NKFilm	Shane Carruth	
2005	Capote	Sony Pictures Classics	Bennett Miller	
2005	Brokeback Mountain	Focus Features	Ang Lee	
2005	A History of Violence	New Line Cinema	David Cronenberg	
2005	Keane	Magnolia Pictures	Lodge Kerrigan	
2005	Me and You and Everyone We Know	IFC Films	Miranda July	
2006	Half Nelson	TH!NKFilm	Ryan Fleck	
2006	The Departed	Warner Bros.	Martin Scorsese	
2006	Little Children	New Line Cinema	Todd Field	
2006	Marie Antoinette	Columbia Pictures	Sofia Coppola	
2006	Old Joy	Kino International	Kelly Reichardt	
2007	Into the Wild	Paramount Vantage	Sean Penn	
2007	Great World of Sound	Magnolia Pictures	Craig Zobel	
2007	I'm Not There	The Weinstein Company	Todd Haynes	
2007	Margot at the Wedding	Paramount Vantage	Noah Baumbach	
2007	The Namesake	Fox Searchlight Pictures	Mira Nair	
2008	Frozen River	Sony Pictures Classics	Courtney Hunt	
2008	Ballast	Alluvial Film Company	Lance Hammer	
2008	Synecdoche, New York	Sony Pictures Classics	Charlie Kaufman	
2008	The Visitor	Overture Films	Tom McCarthy	
2008	The Wrestler	Fox Searchlight Pictures	Darren Aronofsky	
2009	The Hurt Locker	Summit Entertainment	Kathryn Bigelow	
2009	Amreeka	Virgil Films & Entertainment	Cherien Dabis	
2009	Big Fan	First Independent Pictures	Robert D. Siegel	
2009	The Maid	Elephant Eye Films	Sebastián Silva	
2009	A Serious Man	Focus Features	Joel Coen and Ethan Coen	

=== 2010s ===
Year	Film	Distributing company(s)	Director(s)	Ref.
2010	Winter's Bone	Roadside Attractions	Debra Granik	
2010	Black Swan	Fox Searchlight Pictures	Darren Aronofsky	
2010	Blue Valentine	The Weinstein Company	Derek Cianfrance	
2010	The Kids Are All Right	Focus Features	Lisa Cholodenko	
2010	Let Me In	Overture Films	Matt Reeves	
2011	Beginners	Focus Features	Mike Mills	
2011	The Tree of Life	Fox Searchlight Pictures	Terrence Malick	
2011	The Descendants	Fox Searchlight Pictures	Alexander Payne	
2011	Meek's Cutoff	Oscilloscope Laboratories	Kelly Reichardt	
2011	Take Shelter	Sony Pictures Classics	Jeff Nichols	
2012	Moonrise Kingdom	Focus Features	Wes Anderson	
2012	Bernie	Millennium Entertainment	Richard Linklater	
2012	The Loneliest Planet	IFC Films	Julia Loktev	
2012	The Master	The Weinstein Company	Paul Thomas Anderson	
2012	Middle of Nowhere	Participant Media	Ava DuVernay	
2013	Inside Llewyn Davis	CBS Films	Joel Coen and Ethan Coen	
2013	12 Years a Slave	Fox Searchlight Pictures	Steve McQueen	
2013	Ain't Them Bodies Saints	IFC Films	David Lowery	
2013	Before Midnight	Sony Pictures Classics	Richard Linklater	
2013	Upstream Color	VHX	Shane Carruth	
2014	Birdman	Fox Searchlight Pictures	Alejandro G. Iñárritu	
2014	Boyhood	IFC Films	Richard Linklater	
2014	The Grand Budapest Hotel	Fox Searchlight Pictures	Wes Anderson	
2014	Love Is Strange	Sony Pictures Classics	Ira Sachs	
2014	Under the Skin	A24	Jonathan Glazer	
2015	Spotlight	Open Road Films	Tom McCarthy	
2015	Carol	StudioCanal / The Weinstein Company	Todd Haynes	
2015	The Diary of a Teenage Girl	Sony Pictures Classics	Marielle Heller	
2015	Heaven Knows What	RADiUS-TWC	Josh Safdie and Benny Safdie	
2015	Tangerine	Magnolia Pictures	Sean Baker	
2016	Moonlight	A24	Barry Jenkins	
2016	Certain Women	IFC Films	Kelly Reichardt	
2016	Everybody Wants Some!!	Paramount Pictures	Richard Linklater	
2016	Manchester by the Sea	Amazon Studios / Roadside Attractions	Kenneth Lonergan	
2016	Paterson	Amazon Studios / Bleecker Street	Jim Jarmusch	
2017	Call Me by Your Name	Sony Pictures Classics	Luca Guadagnino	
2017	The Florida Project	A24	Sean Baker	
2017	Get Out	Universal Pictures/Blumhouse	Jordan Peele	
2017	Good Time	A24	Josh Safdie and Benny Safdie	
2017	I, Tonya	Neon	Craig Gillespie	
2018	The Rider	Sony Pictures Classics	Chloé Zhao	
2018	The Favourite	Fox Searchlight Pictures	Yorgos Lanthimos	
2018	First Reformed	A24	Paul Schrader	
2018	If Beale Street Could Talk	Annapurna Pictures	Barry Jenkins	
2018	Madeline's Madeline	Oscilloscope Laboratories	Josephine Decker	
2019	Marriage Story	Netflix	Noah Baumbach	
2019	The Farewell	A24	Lulu Wang	
2019	Hustlers	STX Entertainment	Lorene Scafaria	
2019	Uncut Gems	A24	Josh Safdie and Benny Safdie	
2019	Waves	A24	Trey Edward Shults	

=== 2020s ===
Year	Film	Distributing company(s)	Director(s)	Ref.
2020	Nomadland	Searchlight Pictures	Chloé Zhao	
2020	The Assistant	Bleecker Street	Kitty Green	
2020	First Cow	A24	Kelly Reichardt	
2020	Never Rarely Sometimes Always	Focus Features	Eliza Hittman	
2020	Relic	IFC Midnight	Natalie Erika James	
2021	The Lost Daughter	Netflix	Maggie Gyllenhaal	
2021	The Green Knight	A24	David Lowery	
2021	Passing	Netflix	Rebecca Hall	
2021	Pig	Neon	Michael Sarnoski	
2021	Test Pattern	Kino Lorber	Shatara Michelle Ford	
2022	Everything Everywhere All at Once	A24	Daniel Kwan and Daniel Scheinert	
2022	Aftersun	A24	Charlotte Wells	
2022	The Cathedral	MUBI	Ricky D'Ambrose	
2022	Dos Estaciones	The Cinema Guild	Juan Pablo González	
2022	Tár	Focus Features	Todd Field	
2023	Past Lives	A24	Celine Song	
2023	Passages	MUBI	Ira Sachs	
2023	Reality	HBO Films	Tina Satter	
2023	Showing Up	A24	Kelly Reichardt	
2023	A Thousand and One	Focus Features	A. V. Rockwell	
2024	A Different Man	A24	Aaron Schimberg	
2024	Anora	Neon	Sean Baker	
2024	Babygirl	A24	Halina Reijn	
2024	Challengers	Amazon MGM Studios	Luca Guadagnino	
2024	Nickel Boys	Amazon MGM Studios / Orion Pictures	RaMell Ross	
2025	One Battle After Another	Warner Bros.	Paul Thomas Anderson	
2025	Bugonia	Focus Features	Yorgos Lanthimos	
2025	East of Wall	Sony Pictures Classics	Kate Beecroft	
2025	Familiar Touch	Music Box Films	Sarah Friedland	
2025	Hamnet	Focus Features	Chloé Zhao	
2025	If I Had Legs I'd Kick You	A24	Mary Bronstein	
2025	Lurker	MUBI	Alex Russell	
2025	Sorry, Baby	A24	Eva Victor	
2025	The Testament of Ann Lee	Searchlight Pictures	Mona Fastvold	
2025	Train Dreams	Netflix	Clint Bentley	
2026	Clarissa	Neon	Chuko Esiri and Arie Esiri	
2026	Club Kid	A24	Jordan Firstman	
2026	The Debut	A24	Jesse Eisenberg	
2026	Dreams in Nightmares	Lunette Films	Shatara Michelle Ford	
2026	The Invite	A24	Olivia Wilde	
2026	Josephine	Sumerian Pictures	Beth de Araújo	
2026	Mouse	Independent Film Company	Kelly O'Sullivan and Alex Thompson	
2026	Paper Tiger	Neon	James Gray	
2026	Primetime	A24	Lance Oppenheim	
2026	Teenage Sex and Death at Camp Miasma	MUBI	Jane Schoenbrun	
2026	Your Mother Your Mother Your Mother	Amazon MGM Studios / Orion Pictures	Bassam Tariq	

== Studios with most wins and nominations (3 or more) ==
- A24 - 21 nominations; 4 wins
- Fox Searchlight/Searchlight - 13 nominations; 4 wins
- Focus Features - 11 nominations; 2 wins
- Sony Pictures Classics - 10 nominations, 4 wins
- IFC Films - 7 nominations, no wins
- Amazon Studios/Amazon MGM Studios - 5 nominations, no wins
- NEON - 5 nominations; no wins
- Netflix - 4 nominations, 2 wins
- MUBI - 4 nominations; no wins
- The Weinstein Company - 4 nominations; no wins
- Paramount Vantage/Paramount - 3 nominations; 1 win
- Warner Bros/Warner Independent Pictures - 3 nominations, 1 win
- Magnolia Pictures - 3 nominations; no wins

== See also ==
- Academy Award for Best Picture
- Independent Spirit Award for Best Film
