= Cynthia Lahti =

American contemporary artist (born 1963)

- Born: Cynthia D. Lahti; 1963 (age 62–63); Portland, Oregon
- Education: B.F.A., Rhode Island School of Design
- Known for: Contemporary art
- Awards: Hallie Ford Fellowship for artists Bonnie Bronson Fellowship; Adolph and Esther Gottlieb Foundation Individual Support Grant; Oregon Arts Commission Individual Artist Fellowship

Cynthia Lahti (born 1963) is an American contemporary artist from Portland, Oregon, who works in many mediums: "from collage to ceramics, altered books, and painting".

== Early life and education ==
Lahti was born in Portland, Oregon, in 1963. She attended Woodrow Wilson High School, and in 1985 earned a B.F.A. at the Rhode Island School of Design. In 1989 she attended the Pacific Northwest College of Art (PNCA), and in 1992 she studied at the Oregon College of Art and Craft (OCAC). Her post-graduate work was at Pilchuck Glass School in Stanwood, Washington.

== Critical reception ==
Lahti's works are held in collections at Reed College, Boise Art Museum, King County Public Art Collection and Oregon Health & Science University (OHSU).

Portland Art Museum said: "Her art practice encompasses drawing, collage, and sculpture and is influenced by human artifacts from ancient times to the present, as well as by personal experiences and emotions."

Los Angeles Times reviewer Leah Ollman wrote, "Cynthia Lahti’s figures shape-shift from clay to stuffed animal, photograph or tree branch, from one form of graceful to another, or from delicate to endearingly clumsy."

Art Forum called her "a long-underrecognized artist’s artist", writing of her works in various media, "Lahti’s purposefully raw, emotionally direct objects bring to mind the accidental elegance of childhood craft projects, but here the results are fraught with disturbing nuances that make a viewer wonder: Can one feel nostalgia for pain?" The Zentrum für Keramik in Berlin said her "work explores human emotions through the evocative power of the figure."

The Portland Institute for Contemporary Art (PICA) described her work as reflecting "a collective conscience with imagery that is deeply referential of Lathi’s own personal experience and emotions. Her sculpture, drawings and photographs become relics made from real materials, methods and symbols that hope to offer an explanation of reality."

== Career ==
Lahti was a participating artist in Curator and Critic Tours Connective Conversations: Inside Oregon Art 2011-2014, a program of the Oregon Arts Commission sponsored by The Ford Family Foundation and the University of Oregon.

Her work is held in the collections of Portland Community College, Boise Art Museum, Reed College, the King County Public Art Collection and Oregon Health & Science University.

In the 2022 narrative feature film, Showing Up, directed by Kelly Reichardt, Cynthia Lahti’s sculptural work is prominently featured as that of the fictional main character, Lizzy, played by Michelle Williams.

=== Selected exhibitions ===
- The Body, The Object, The Other. Craft Contemporary, Park La Brea, Los Angeles California, January – 25, 2020–January 10, 2021
- Let's Get Lost, PDX Contemporary Art, Portland, Oregon, June 30, 2015 – August 1, 2015
- Cynthia Lahti: Battle, PDX Contemporary Art, Portland, Oregon, March 3, 2015 – March 28, 2015
- We Tell Ourselves Stories In Order To Live, Jordan Schnitzer Museum of Art, University of Oregon, Eugene, Oregon, January 18, 2014 – March 16, 2014

== Awards ==
The Oregon Arts Commission awarded Lahti a 2006 Artist Fellowship and a 2008 Career Opportunity Grant for Artists. In 2013 she won a Hallie Ford Fellowship for artists, and in 2015 she was awarded the Bonnie Bronson Fellowship. Lahti was awarded the 2017 Adolph and Esther Gottlieb Foundation Individual Support Grant. In 2018, the Oregon Arts Commission selected her for an Individual Artist Fellowship.
