= Orion Lee =

Hong Kong-Australian actor

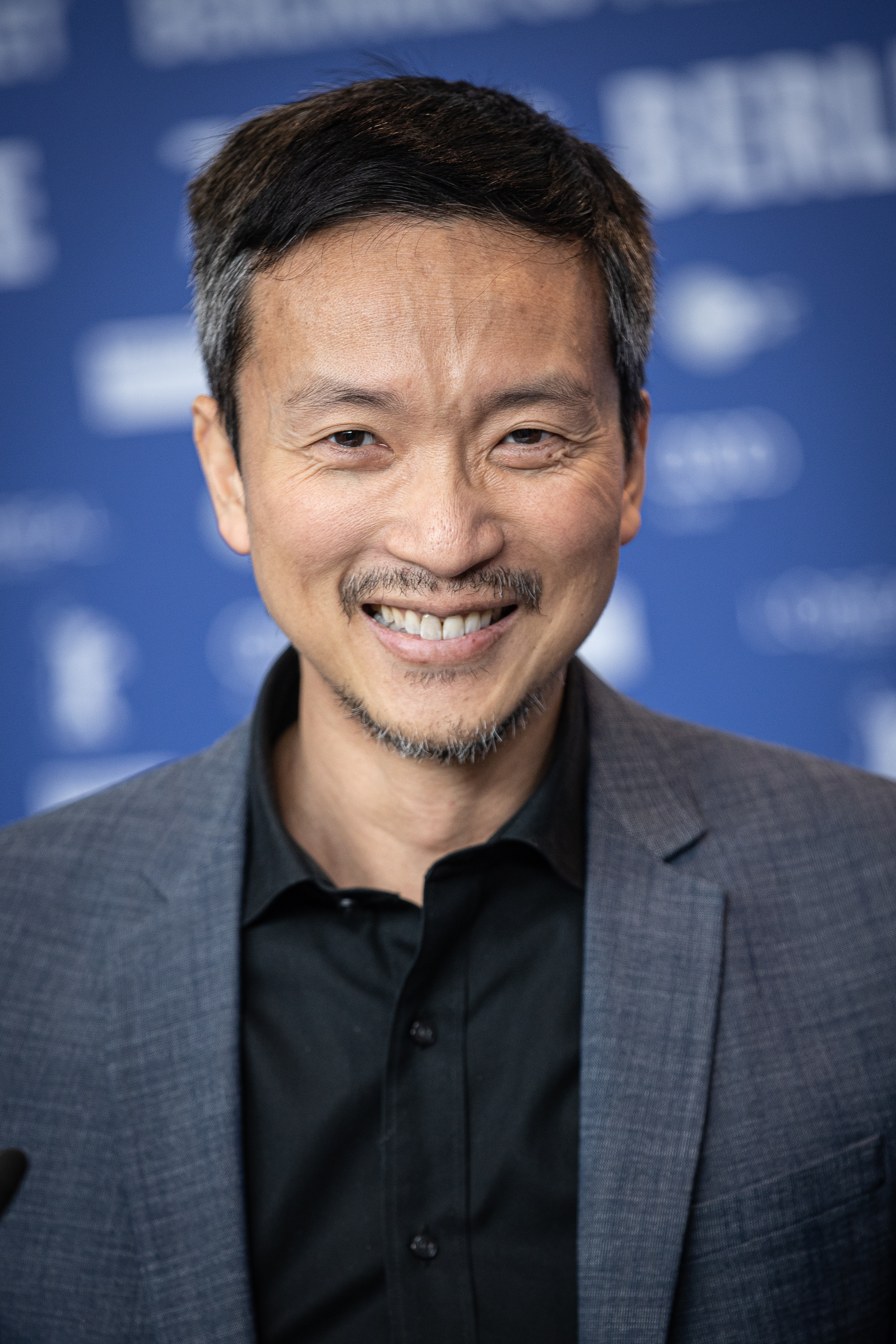
- Lee at the screening of the film First Cow during the 2020 Berlin Film Festival.
- Born: Hong Kong
- Education: London Academy of Music and Dramatic Art
- Occupation: Actor
- Years active: 2009–present

Orion Lee is a Hong Kong-Australian actor. He was nominated for an Independent Spirit Award for Best Supporting Male for his performance in the film First Cow (2019).

== Early life and education ==
Orion Lee was born in Hong Kong. He later lived in Malaysia, Australia, New York, San Francisco, Zurich, and London. Before attending the London Academy of Music and Dramatic Art and training as an actor, Lee worked in the financial industry as a fund manager.

== Career ==
In addition to his career as a film and television actor, Lee has performed at various theatres in Scotland, England and Ireland, including in 2015 at the Swan Theatre of the Royal Shakespeare Company in Stratford-upon-Avon in Ben Jonson's Volpone in a production by Trevor Nunn as Mosca, at the National Theatre of Scotland in Edinburgh, the Abbey Theatre in Dublin, the American Repertory Theatre in Cambridge and in the West End.

In Kelly Reichardt's drama film First Cow, which premiered at the Telluride Film Festival in August 2019, Lee played the lead role of King-Lu. His performance earned widespread acclaim and several accolades, including Independent Spirit Award and Gotham Award nominations.

== Filmography ==
=== Feature film ===
Year	Title	Role	Notes
2012	Skyfall	Shanghai Barman	
2014	X+Y	Deng Lagoshi	
2014	Panic	Yi	
2014	Fury	Tired GI	
2015	Narcopolis	Mr. Chang	
2015	M.L.E.	Sebastian	
2017	Justice League	Star Labs Scientist	
2017	Star Wars: The Last Jedi	Canady's First Order Monitor	
2018	Dead in a Week or Your Money Back	Lawrence	
2018	I Am Vengeance	Burke	
2018	Catacombe	Charlie Yuen	
2018	Only You	Eddie	
2019	First Cow	King-Lu	
2021	Zack Snyder's Justice League	Star Labs Scientist	Reedit of Justice League
2021	Followers	Edward Lee	
2022	Turning Red	Jin (voice)	
2025	Rosemead	Charles	
2026	Project Hail Mary	Dr. Li	

=== Short film ===
Year	Title	Role	Notes
2010	Macbeth No More	Big Mac	
2012	Portraits of London	Jonathan	
2012	Formalities		
2013	#aiww: The Arrest of Ai Weiwei	Sportsman	
2013	Happy Birthday Cindy Wei	Michael	
2016	The Sea, the God, the Man	Son	
2016	That Day Comes	Tony Lin Xiao	
2017	Pov	Michael	
2018	Pommel	Dad	
2019	Vanish in Smoke	Ralph	

=== Television ===
Year	Title	Role	Notes
2011	Silent Witness	Dr. Oliver Matthews	2 episodes
2013	Dates	Tony	2 episodes
2013	Run	Andy	Episode: "Ying"
2015	EastEnders	Obstetrician	2 episodes
2015	Critical	Brian Zhao	6 episodes
2015	Code of a Killer	Jack Wu	Episode: "Episode 2"
2015	Tyrant	Ambassador Zhang	4 episodes
2016	DCI Banks	Chang Li	2 episodes
2018	Strangers	Allen Ma	2 episodes
2018	Informer	Jin Weijun	3 episodes
2019	Chimerica	Tang Wen Lei	3 episodes
2019	Warrior	Po	Episode: "If You're Going to Bow, Bow Low"
2022	Significant Others	Father Shirley	2 episodes
2022	Bump	Karl	2 episodes
2024	Rematch	P.C.	6 episodes

=== Video games ===
Year	Title	Voice role(s)	Notes
2016	Battlefleet Gothic: Armada	Tau Air Caste, Tau Water Caste	
2017	007 Legends	Mr. Ling, Moonraker Scientist	
2022	The Pirate Queen: A Forgotten Legend	Cheung Po Tsai	

=== Web ===
Year	Title	Role	Notes
2014	The Expert	Anderson	

== Theatre ==
Year	Title	Role	Venue	Notes
2009–10	Enron	Senator	Chichester Festival Theatre, Chichester	
2009–10	Enron	Senator	Royal Court Theatre, London	
2009–10	Enron	Senator	Noël Coward Theatre, London	
2009–10	Enron	Senator	Minerva Theatre, Chichester	
2011	The Wheel		National Theatre of Scotland, Edinburgh	
2012	Wild Swans	Shou-Yu	American Repertory Theater, Cambridge	
2012	Shibari	Hideo	Abbey Theatre, Dublin	
2015	Volpone	Mosca	Royal Shakespeare Theatre, Stratford-upon-Avon	

== Awards and nominations ==
Award	Year	Category	Work	Result
Detroit Film Critics Society	2021	Best Breakthrough Performance	First Cow	Nominated
Georgia Film Critics Association	2021	Best Supporting Actor	First Cow	Nominated
Gotham Award	2021	Breakthrough Performer	First Cow	Nominated
Independent Spirit Award	2021	Best Supporting Male	First Cow	Nominated
Indiana Film Journalists Association	2020	Best Supporting Actor	First Cow	Nominated
Indiana Film Journalists Association	2020	Breakout of the Year	First Cow	Nominated
North Dakota Film Society	2021	Best Supporting Actor	First Cow	Nominated
Sunset Film Circle	2020	Best Breakthrough	First Cow	Won
