= 2020 New York Film Critics Circle Awards =

86th New York Film Critics Circle Awards

86th NYFCC Awards
- Date: December 18, 2020

Highlights
- Best Picture: First Cow
- Best Director: Chloé Zhao
- Website: http://www.nyfcc.com/awards

The 86th New York Film Critics Circle Awards, honoring the best in film for 2020, were announced on December 18, 2020. Winners accepted their awards in a ceremony streamed online on January 24, 2021, which was held virtually due to the COVID-19 pandemic.

== Winners ==
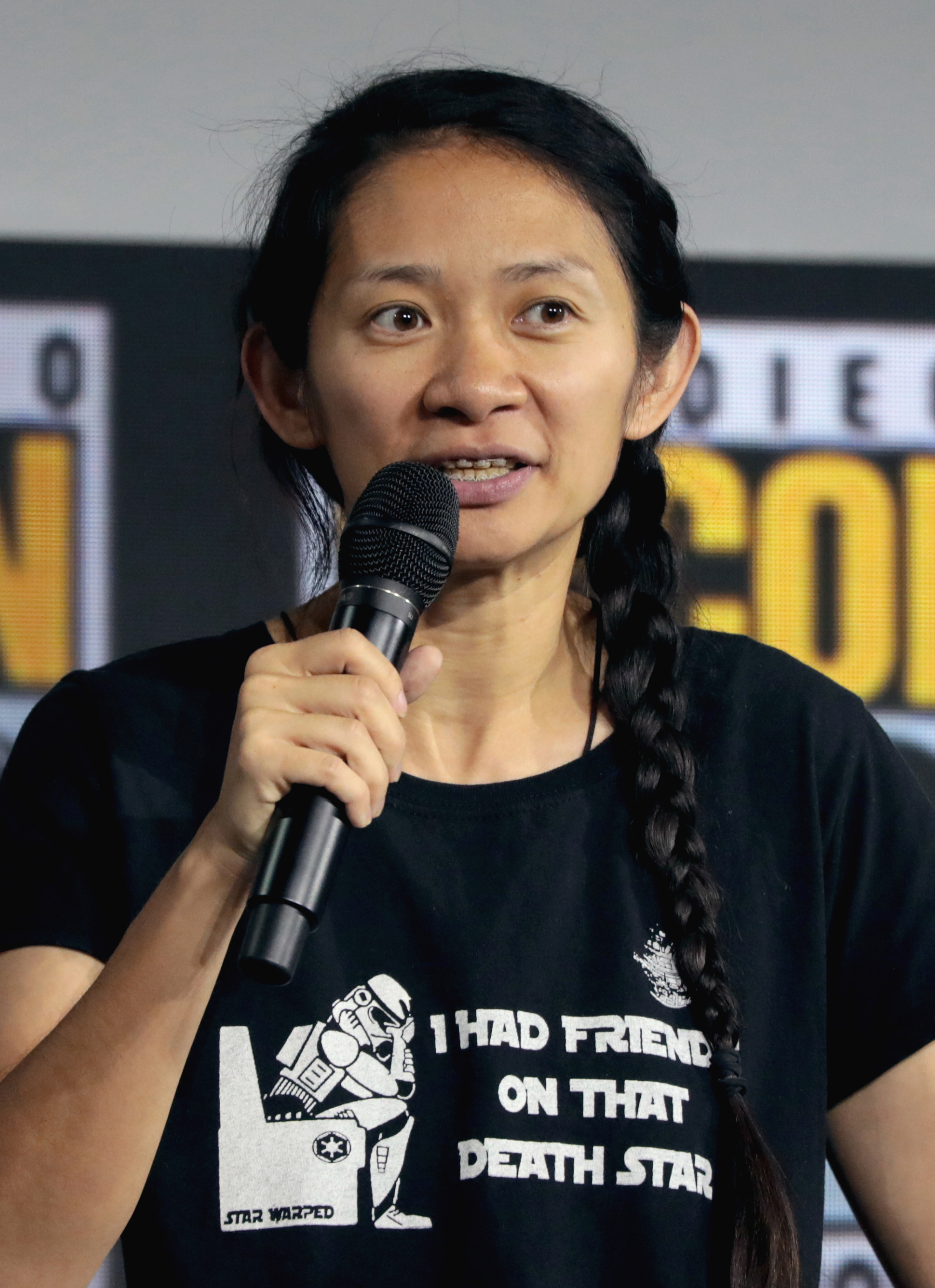
Chloé Zhao, Best Director winner

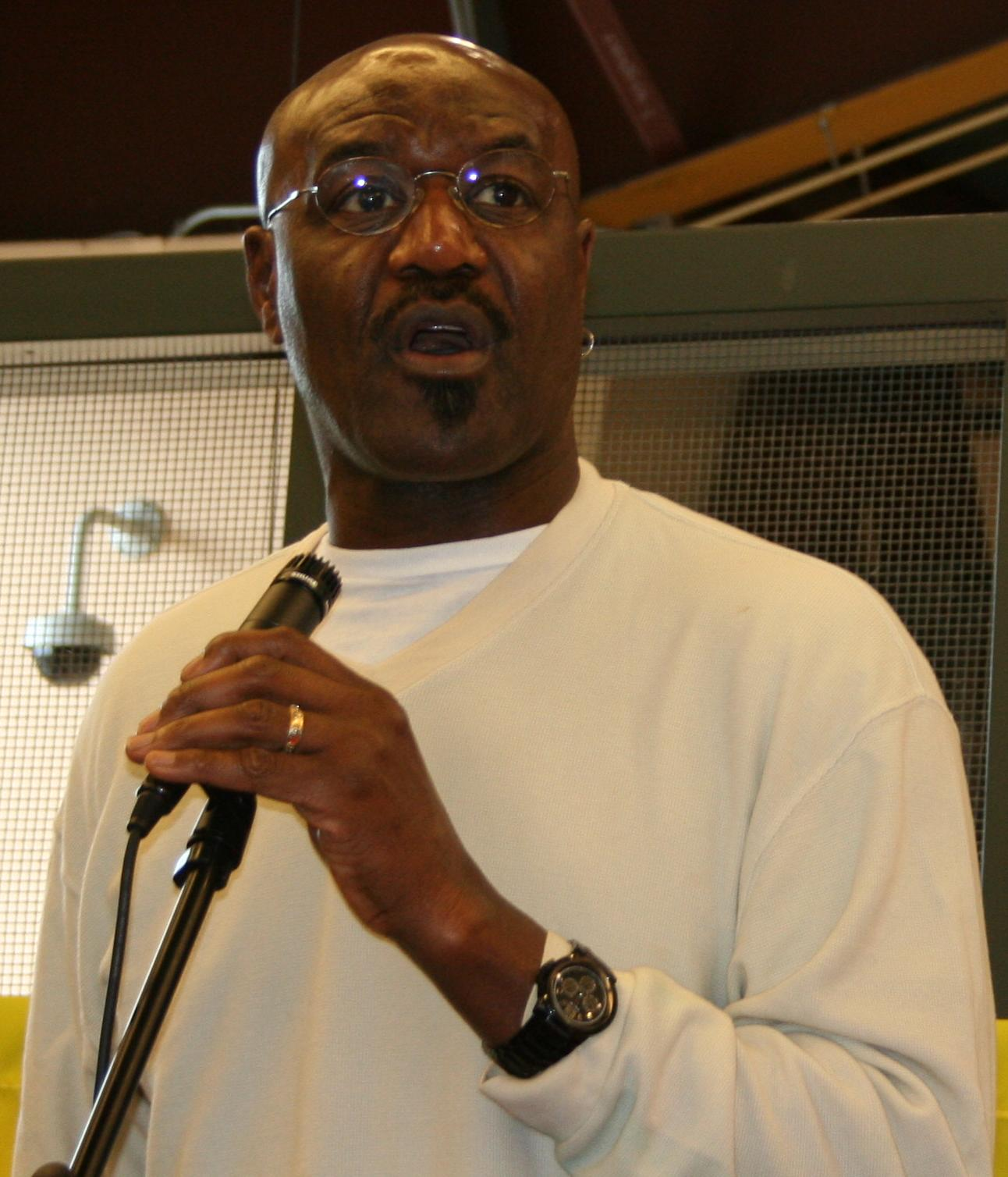
Delroy Lindo, Best Actor winner

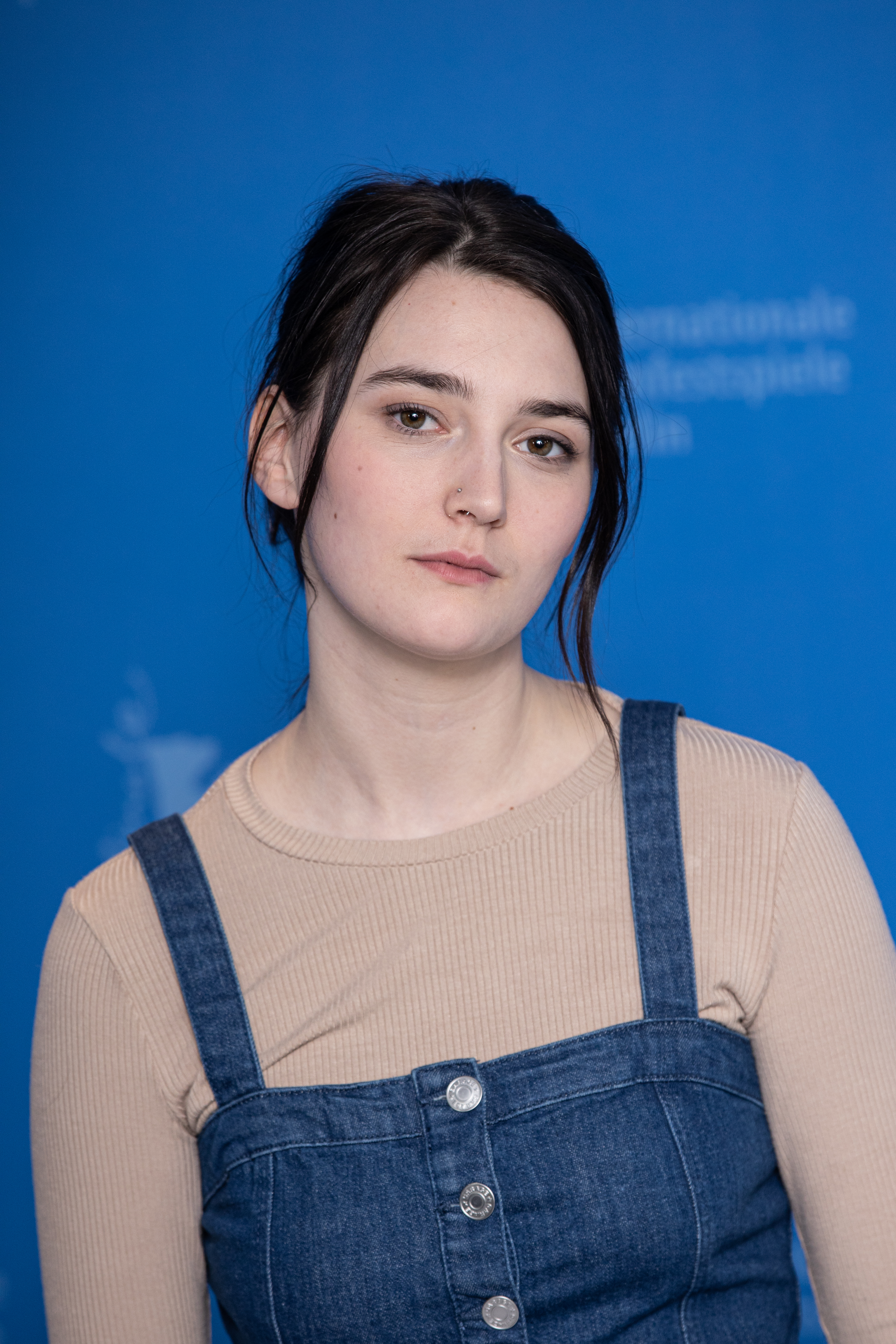
Sidney Flanigan, Best Actress winner

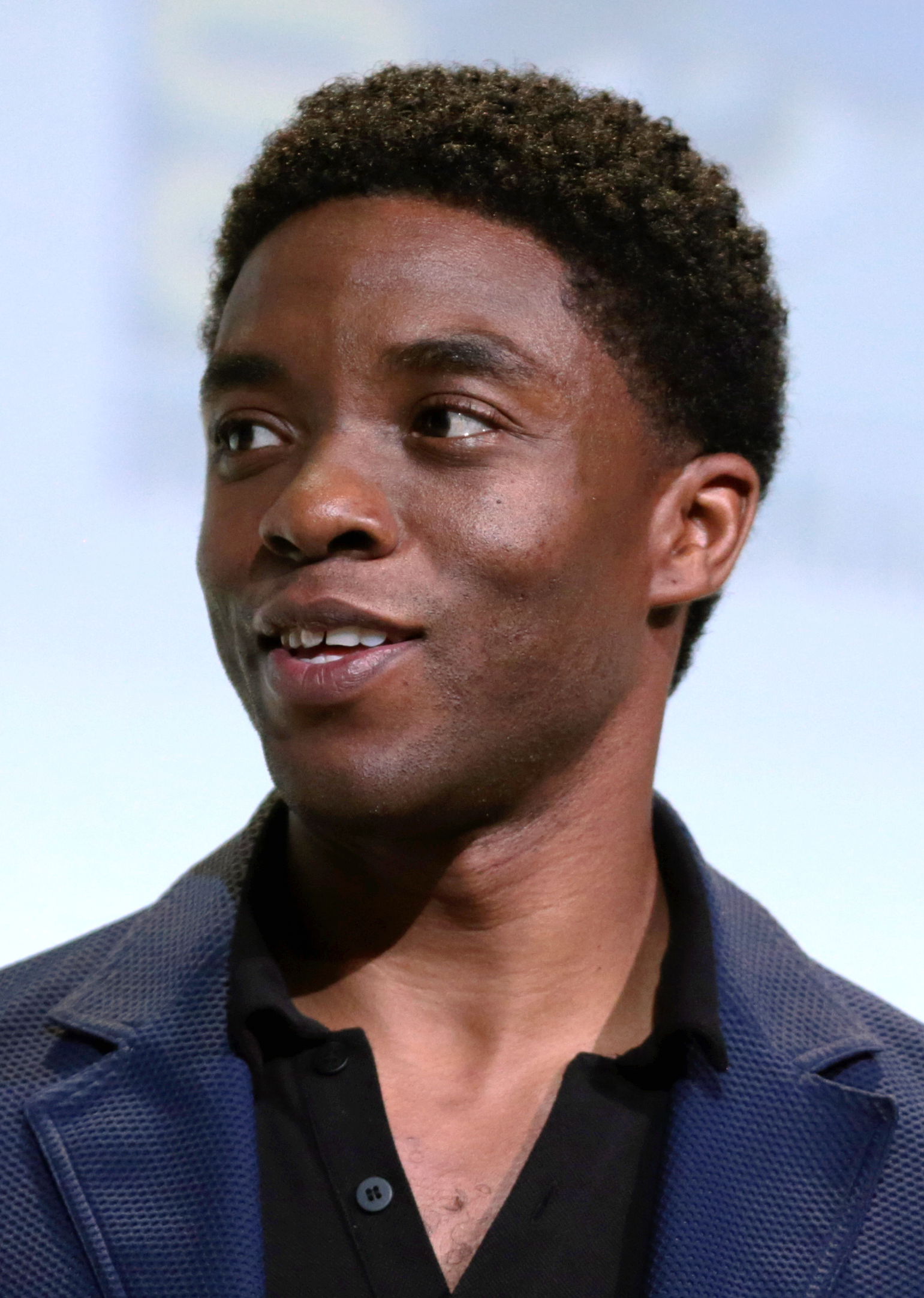
Chadwick Boseman, Best Supporting Actor winner

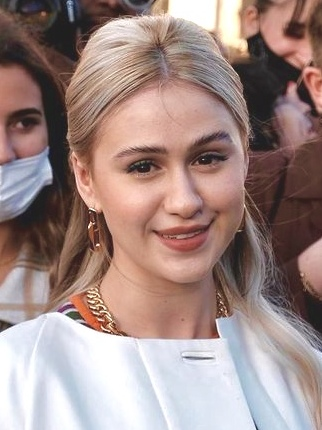
Maria Bakalova, Best Supporting Actress winner

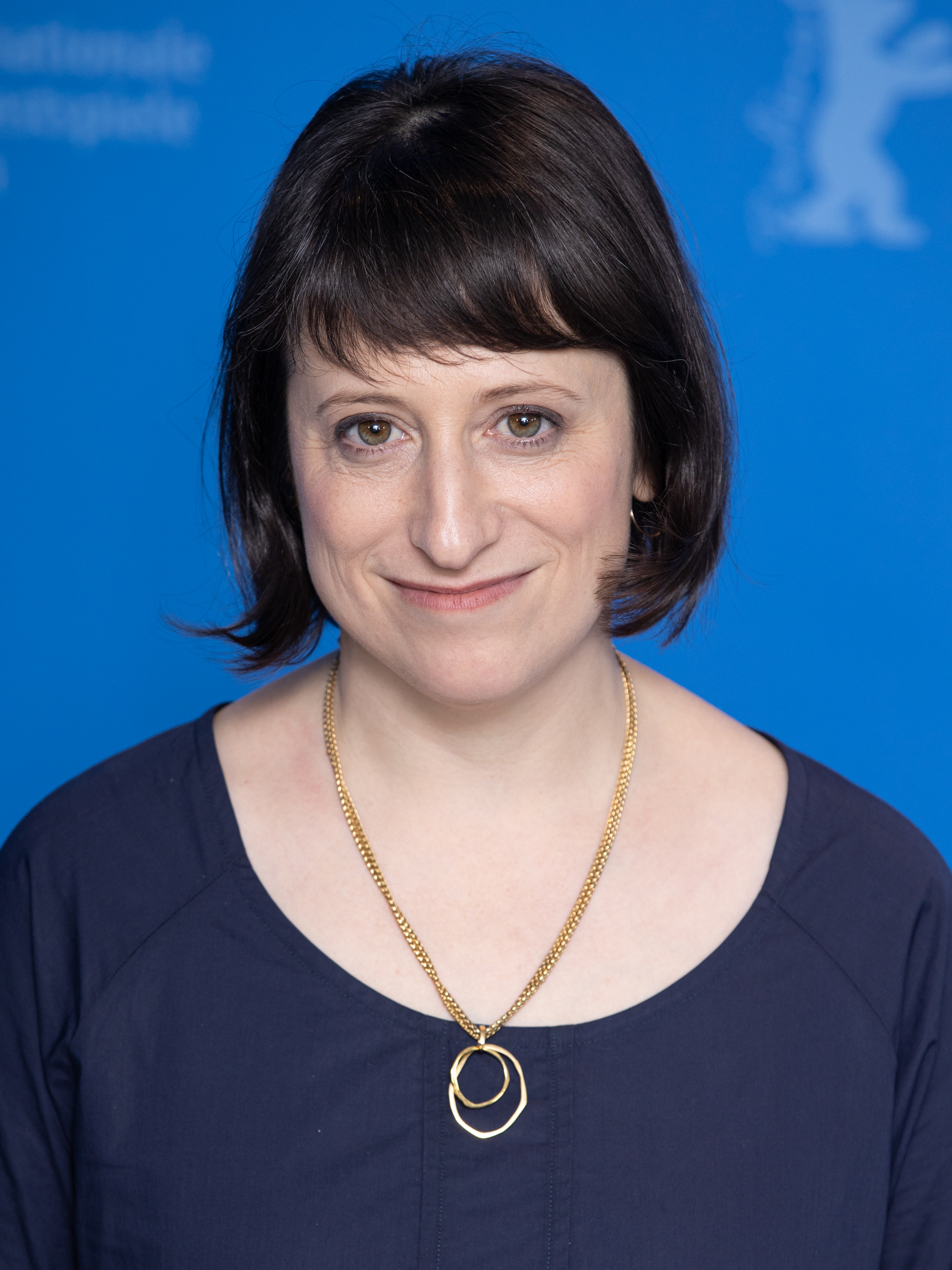
Eliza Hittman, Best Screenplay winner

- Best Film:
  - First Cow
- Best Director:
  - Chloé Zhao – Nomadland
- Best Actor:
  - Delroy Lindo – Da 5 Bloods
- Best Actress:
  - Sidney Flanigan – Never Rarely Sometimes Always
- Best Supporting Actor:
  - Chadwick Boseman – Da 5 Bloods (posthumous)
- Best Supporting Actress:
  - Maria Bakalova – Borat Subsequent Moviefilm
- Best Screenplay:
  - Eliza Hittman – Never Rarely Sometimes Always
- Best Animated Film:
  - Wolfwalkers
- Best Cinematography:
  - Shabier Kirchner – Small Axe
- Best Non-Fiction Film:
  - Time
- Best Foreign Language Film:
  - Bacurau • Brazil
- Best First Film:
  - Radha Blank – The Forty-Year-Old Version
- Special Award:
  - Spike Lee and Kino Lorber
