= Wendy and Lucy =

- Promotional poster
- Directed by: Kelly Reichardt
- Screenplay by: Jon Raymond; Kelly Reichardt
- Based on: "Train Choir" by Jon Raymond
- Produced by: Larry Fessenden; Neil Kopp; Anish Savjani
- Starring: Michelle Williams; Walter Dalton; Will Oldham; Larry Fessenden; John Robinson; Will Patton
- Cinematography: Sam Levy
- Edited by: Kelly Reichardt
- Production companies: Field Guide Films; Film Science; Glass Eye Pix; Washington Square Films
- Distributed by: Oscilloscope Pictures
- Release dates: May 22, 2008 (Cannes Film Festival); December 10, 2008 (United States)
- Running time: 80 minutes
- Country: United States
- Language: English
- Budget: $300,000
- Box office: $1.4 million

Wendy and Lucy is a 2008 American drama film directed by Kelly Reichardt. Reichardt and Jon Raymond adapted the screenplay from his short story "Train Choir". The film stars Michelle Williams as Wendy, a homeless woman who searches for her lost dog, Lucy (played by Reichardt's own dog of that name, who had previously appeared in Old Joy). It had its world premiere at the 2008 Cannes Film Festival and was screened at several additional film festivals before receiving a limited theatrical release in the United States on December 10, 2008.

== Plot ==
A young woman, Wendy Carroll, is traveling to Alaska with her dog Lucy, where she hopes to find work at a cannery. They become stranded in Oregon when Wendy's car breaks down, and she lacks the funds to repair it. At a supermarket, she leaves Lucy outside while she attempts to shoplift dog food. After a meeting with the store clerk and the manager, Wendy is apprehended and taken to the police station.

After paying a $50 fine, Wendy is released from police custody. She hurries to the grocery store, but Lucy is gone. After many failed efforts to find Lucy, with the help of a Walgreens security guard, Wendy discovers that she has been taken to a dog pound and rehomed.

Wendy learns that her car needs to be rebuilt and decides to abandon it. She goes to the home where Lucy lives and tearfully promises to return, departing on a northbound train.

== Cast ==
- Michelle Williams as Wendy Carroll
- Walter Dalton as Security guard
- Will Patton as Mechanic
- Larry Fessenden as man in Park
- Will Oldham as Icky
- John Robinson as Andy Mooney
- Deirdre O'Connell (voice) as Deb
- Lucy as herself

== Release ==
=== Box office ===
In its opening weekend, Wendy and Lucy grossed $18,218 in 2 theaters in the United States, ranking #54 at the box office. By the end of its run, Wendy and Lucy grossed $865,695 domestically and $326,960 internationally for a worldwide total of $1,192,655.

=== Critical reception ===
The film has received generally positive reviews from critics. On the review aggregation site Rotten Tomatoes, the film holds an 86% approval rating among 183 critics, with an average score of 7.4/10. The site's consensus reads "Michelle Williams gives a heartbreaking performance in Wendy and Lucy, a timely portrait of loneliness and struggle". On Metacritic, the film has a weighted average score of 80 out of 100, based on 32 critics, indicating "generally favorable reviews". The film won both Best Picture and Best Actress at the 12th Toronto Film Critics Association Awards.

== Accolades ==
Award	Category	Outcome
American Film Institute Awards 2008	Movie Of The Year	Won
Alliance of Women Film Journalists 2008
Alliance of Women Film Journalists 2008	EDA Award, Best Actress for Michelle Williams	Nominated
Alliance of Women Film Journalists 2008	EDA Female Focus Award, Best Director for Kelly Reichardt	Nominated
Alliance of Women Film Journalists 2008	EDA Female Focus Award, Best Screenwriter for Kelly Reichardt	Nominated
Cannes Film Festival 2008	Palm Dog Award for Lucy	Won
Cannes Film Festival 2008	Un Certain Regard for Kelly Reichardt	Nominated
Chicago International Film Festival 2008	Gold Hugo for Best Feature	Nominated
Chlotrudis Society for Independent Film	Best Actress for Michelle Williams; Best Director for Kelly Reichardt	Nominated
Dallas–Fort Worth Film Critics Association Awards 2008	Russell Smith Award for Kelly Reichardt	Won
Gijón International Film Festival	Grand Prix Asturias, Best Film	Nominated
Independent Spirit Awards 2009	Best Feature	Nominated
Independent Spirit Awards 2009	Best Female Lead for Michelle Williams	Nominated
International Cinephile Society Awards 2008	Best Adapted Screenplay for Kelly Reichardt; Best Adapted Screenplay for Jonathan Raymond	Won
International Cinephile Society Awards 2008	Best Actress for Michelle Williams	Nominated
National Board of Review Awards 2008	Top Independent Feature	Won
Online Film Critics Society Awards 2008	Best Actress for Michelle Williams	Won
Toronto Film Critics Association Awards 2008	Best Female Performance for Michelle Williams	Won
Toronto Film Critics Association Awards 2008	Best Picture for Kelly Reichardt	Won
