= First Cow =

2019 American drama film by Kelly Reichardt

- Theatrical release poster
- Directed by: Kelly Reichardt
- Screenplay by: Jonathan Raymond; Kelly Reichardt
- Based on: The Half-Life by Jonathan Raymond
- Produced by: Neil Kopp; Vincent Savino; Anish Savjani
- Starring: John Magaro; Orion Lee; Toby Jones; Ewen Bremner; Scott Shepherd; Gary Farmer; Lily Gladstone
- Cinematography: Christopher Blauvelt
- Edited by: Kelly Reichardt
- Music by: William Tyler
- Production companies: Filmscience; IAC Films
- Distributed by: A24
- Release dates: August 30, 2019 (Telluride); March 6, 2020 (United States)
- Running time: 121 minutes
- Country: United States
- Language: English
- Budget: $2 million+ (Note: Reichardt stated that First Cow was "a low-budget film, obviously, but bigger for me" and her previous films had budgets of $2 million.)
- Box office: $1.4 million

First Cow is a 2019 American drama film directed by Kelly Reichardt and co-written with Jonathan Raymond, based on Raymond's 2004 novel The Half-Life. Set in 1820s Oregon Country, it follows a traveling cook and a Chinese immigrant who start an illicit business using milk stolen from a wealthy trader's cow. The film stars John Magaro, Orion Lee, Toby Jones, Ewen Bremner, Lily Gladstone, and René Auberjonois in one of his final roles.

The film premiered at the Telluride Film Festival on August 30, 2019, and competed for the Golden Bear at the 70th Berlin International Film Festival. It was released in the United States by A24 in March 2020, with a wider digital release in July 2020. First Cow received critical acclaim, winning Best Film from the New York Film Critics Circle, and was named one of the ten best films of 2020 by the National Board of Review, as well as the third-best film of 2020 by Sight and Sound.

== Plot ==
In the present, a woman walking her dog on the riverside discovers two skeletons lying together, barely covered by the soil.

In 1820, Otis "Cookie" Figowitz is a quiet chef traveling in Oregon Country with a group of loud and aggressive fur trappers who harass him for not finding them enough food. One night, he comes across King-Lu, a Chinese immigrant on the run for killing a Russian man. Cookie allows Lu to hide in his tent for the night and watches him escape across the river the next day.

Cookie's group reaches a fort and Lu finds him there, babysitting an infant in the middle of a bar fight, and invites him to his house. Cookie moves in, and learns Lu is thinking about starting a farm, while Cookie talks about opening a bakery or hotel in San Francisco.

Meanwhile, the outpost's first milk cow has arrived; her mate and calf died on the journey. She is left unattended at night just outside the house of the wealthiest trader in town, the English Chief Factor. Lu laments that poor men don't stand a chance to get ahead without some kind of fortune or committing a crime. Cookie reminisces about his days as a baker's assistant in Boston and tells Lu that he could use some of the cow's milk to make baked goods. They sneak onto the Chief Factor's property at night, Cookie milking the cow and Lu keeping watch from a tree. They manage to get enough milk to bake a batch of buttermilk biscuits. Cookie is unsatisfied with the result, wishing it could be sweeter, but Lu points out they are far better than anything on the outpost and suggests they could make a fortune. Cookie refines his recipe and adds honey.

They take their first batch of sweet oily cakes to market. When asked the recipe, Lu claims it's a "Chinese secret." The first few men to try them excitedly ask for more, and a bidding war erupts for the last cake. Word spreads and the men line up day after day as they run out. One day, a big man shoves a slight man aside for the last cake, and Lu does not object, only caring for the money. As they get richer, they decide it's safer to store their money in a tree than to take it to a bank.

The Chief Factor tries their cakes and asks Cookie to bake a clafoutis, the favorite of a captain he wants to impress at their next meeting. Lu and Cookie proudly deliver the clafoutis and observe as the Chief Factor offers tea with cream to the captain, remarking that despite his cow's good breeding, it is producing very little milk. He takes the captain, the chief, Cookie and Lu to see the cow, which recognizes Cookie and nuzzles him. Cookie urges Lu to leave town now, sensing the danger, but Lu persuades him they don't have enough to get to San Francisco and start their business, so they go back the next night to milk the cow once again.

A man at the Chief Factor's estate comes out to fetch a cat, and the tree branch breaks before Cookie hears Lu's warning call. They run as the alarm is raised, and after the captain sees the pail and stool and informs the Chief Factor his cow was being milked, they send their men to kill Lu and Cookie. When they reach a river, Lu jumps, but Cookie hides, then falls down a hill, hitting his head. Cookie wakes up in a shack, helped by an elderly Native Hawaiian couple. He says he needs to find his friend and soon leaves.

Lu trades his buttons to hire a canoe to go downstream in search of Cookie, and returns to the shack, hiding from the Chief Factor's men rummaging through the destruction. He retrieves their money from the tree. Cookie returns to the shack, walking by the cow on the Factor's estate, now surrounded by a fence. He is spied by the slight man Lu ignored in line at the market, who follows with a rifle.

Cookie finds Lu at the shack, and Lu suggests they catch the next boat south. Cookie can't keep up through the woods and he lies down, clearly fatigued. Lu tells Cookie they will be safe and promises to keep watch, then lies beside him, reassures him, and closes his eyes.

== Cast ==
- John Magaro as Otis "Cookie" Figowitz
- Orion Lee as King-Lu
- René Auberjonois as Man with Raven
- Toby Jones as Chief Factor
- Ewen Bremner as Lloyd
- Scott Shepherd as Captain
- Gary Farmer as Totillicum
- Lily Gladstone as Chief Factor's Wife
- Alia Shawkat as Woman with Dog
- Dylan Smith as Jack
- Stephen Malkmus as Fiddler
- Mitchell Saddleback as Chief Factor's Servant
- Jared Kasowski as Thomas
- Todd A. Robinson as Fort Trapper

== Production ==
In October 2018, it was announced that Kelly Reichardt would direct the film, from a screenplay she wrote alongside Jonathan Raymond. Neil Kopp, Vincent Savino, Anish Savjani, Scott Rudin and Eli Bush would produce the film under their FilmScience and Scott Rudin Productions banners, respectively, while A24 would distribute.

In November 2018, René Auberjonois was cast in the film. In March 2019, it was announced that John Magaro had joined the cast.

Principal photography began in November 2018 in Oregon. The opening shot shows a barge on the Columbia River. The film was shot in a 4:3 aspect ratio. Reichardt dedicated the film to Peter Hutton, with whom she taught at Bard College.

=== The cow ===
In the film, the cow's pedigree is described as "half Alderney of Isigny" and "half Froment du Léon from the province of Brittany". The Alderney breed from the British Channel Islands became extinct in the 20th century, when it was subsumed into the two other breeds from the Channel Islands, the Guernsey and the Jersey. In the film, the cow is played by Evie, a Jersey cow: director and co-writer Kelly Reichardt said "We narrowed it down so we knew we wanted a Jersey cow, just for the physical size of a Jersey cow. They have these huge eyes.".

== Release ==
First Cow had its world premiere at the Telluride Film Festival on August 30, 2019. It screened at the New York Film Festival on September 28, 2019. Although it was released in four U.S. theaters on March 6, 2020, the film was pulled from release by A24 on March 15, due to the COVID-19 pandemic. It was released for purchase on VOD platforms on July 10, 2020, and became available to rent on July 21.

== Reception ==
=== Critical response ===
On review aggregator Rotten Tomatoes, the film holds an approval rating of 96% based on 209 reviews, with an average score of 8.4/10. The website's critical consensus reads, "First Cow finds director Kelly Reichardt revisiting territory and themes that will be familiar to fans of her previous work—with typically rewarding results." On Metacritic, the film has a weighted average score of 89 out of 100, based on 44 critics, indicating "universal acclaim".

A. A. Dowd and Katie Rife of The A.V. Club gave the film a positive review, praising its simplicity and precise storytelling.

At the end of 2020, 119 film critics included the film on their top-ten lists, with 18 ranking it first and 20 ranking it second.

=== Accolades ===
Award	Date of ceremony	Category	Recipient(s)	Result	Ref.
Berlin International Film Festival	March 1, 2020	Golden Bear	Kelly Reichardt	Nominated	
Boston Society of Film Critics Awards	December 13, 2020	Best Film	First Cow	Runner-up	
Boston Society of Film Critics Awards	December 13, 2020	Best Director	Kelly Reichardt	Runner-up	
New York Film Critics Circle Awards	December 18, 2020	Best Film	First Cow	Won	
Chicago Film Critics Association	December 21, 2020	Best Film	First Cow	Nominated	
Chicago Film Critics Association	December 21, 2020	Best Director	Kelly Reichardt	Nominated	
Chicago Film Critics Association	December 21, 2020	Best Adapted Screenplay	Jon Raymond and Kelly Reichardt	Nominated	
Chicago Film Critics Association	December 21, 2020	Best Cinematography	Christopher Blauvelt	Nominated	
Chicago Film Critics Association	December 21, 2020	Best Art Direction	Lisa Ward and Vanessa Knoll	Nominated	
Chicago Film Critics Association	December 21, 2020	Best Costume Design	April Napier	Nominated	
Florida Film Critics Circle	December 21, 2020	Best Film	First Cow	Won	
Florida Film Critics Circle	December 21, 2020	Best Director	Kelly Reichardt	Runner-up	
Florida Film Critics Circle	December 21, 2020	Best Actor	John Magaro	Runner-up	
Florida Film Critics Circle	December 21, 2020	Best Adapted Screenplay	Jon Raymond and Kelly Reichardt	Nominated	
Florida Film Critics Circle	December 21, 2020	Best Score	William Tyler	Nominated	
Alliance of Women Film Journalists	January 4, 2021	Best Director	Kelly Reichardt	Nominated	
Alliance of Women Film Journalists	January 4, 2021	Best Screenplay, Adapted	Jon Raymond and Kelly Reichardt	Nominated	
Alliance of Women Film Journalists	January 4, 2021	Best Woman Director	Kelly Reichardt	Nominated	
National Society of Film Critics	January 9, 2021	Best Picture		Runner-up	
National Society of Film Critics	January 9, 2021	Best Director	Kelly Reichardt	Runner-up	
National Society of Film Critics	January 9, 2021	Best Screenplay	Jon Raymond and Kelly Reichardt	Runner-up	
Gotham Awards	January 11, 2021	Best Feature	First Cow	Nominated	
Gotham Awards	January 11, 2021	Best Actor	John Magaro	Nominated	
Gotham Awards	January 11, 2021	Breakthrough Actor	Orion Lee	Nominated	
Gotham Awards	January 11, 2021	Best Screenplay	Jon Raymond and Kelly Reichardt	Nominated	
Online Film Critics Society Awards	January 25, 2021	Best Picture	First Cow	Nominated	
Online Film Critics Society Awards	January 25, 2021	Best Director	Kelly Reichardt	Nominated	
Online Film Critics Society Awards	January 25, 2021	Best Adapted Screenplay	Jonathan Raymond and Kelly Reichardt	Nominated	
Online Film Critics Society Awards	January 25, 2021	Best Cinematography	Christopher Blauvelt	Nominated	
National Board of Review	January 26, 2021	Top 10 Films	First Cow	Won (Note: Award shared with nine other films.)	
Toronto Film Critics Association	February 7, 2021	Best Film	First Cow	Runner-up	
Toronto Film Critics Association	February 7, 2021	Best Director	Kelly Reichardt	Runner-up	
Critics' Choice Movie Awards	March 7, 2021	Best Adapted Screenplay	Jonathan Raymond and Kelly Reichardt	Nominated	
Critics' Choice Movie Awards	March 7, 2021	Best Cinematography	Christopher Blauvelt	Nominated	
Detroit Film Critics Society	March 8, 2021	Best Picture	First Cow	Nominated	
Detroit Film Critics Society	March 8, 2021	Breakthrough Performance	Orion Lee	Nominated	
Detroit Film Critics Society	March 8, 2021	Best Adapted Screenplay	Kelly Reichardt and Jonathan Raymond	Nominated	
Austin Film Critics Association	March 19, 2021	Best Film	First Cow	Nominated	
Austin Film Critics Association	March 19, 2021	Best Director	Kelly Reichardt	Nominated	
Independent Spirit Awards	April 22, 2021	Best Feature	Neil Kopp, Vincent Savino and Anish Savjani	Nominated	
Independent Spirit Awards	April 22, 2021	Best Director	Kelly Reichardt	Nominated	
Independent Spirit Awards	April 22, 2021	Best Supporting Male	Orion Lee	Nominated	
British Independent Film Awards	December 5, 2021	Best International Independent Film	Kelly Reichardt, Jon Raymond, Neil Kopp, Vincent Savino and Anish Savjani	Nominated	
César Awards	February 25, 2022	Best Foreign Film	Kelly Reichardt	Nominated	

== See also ==
- Native Americans in film
- Oregon Trail
- Slow cinema
