= Neil Kopp =

American film producer

Neil Kopp is an American film producer. His films include Old Joy (2006), Paranoid Park (2007), Green Room (2015), I Don't Feel at Home in This World Anymore (2017), Showing Up (2022), and Rebel Ridge (2024).

== Life and career ==
Born and raised in Portland, Oregon, Kopp attended the Vancouver Film School in British Columbia, Canada where he majored in Film Production.

Kopp's feature film debut was Kelly Reichardt's Old Joy, a 2006 film about two reunited friends based in Mount Hood in Southeast Portland, where he grew up. After reading the film's script, he came aboard the project in part due to his familiarity with the story's locations, describing Mount Hood and the Bagby Hot Springs area as his "stomping grounds". He was active in the pre-production of the film, acting as a location scout and location manager, using the back roads and camping grounds he was familiar with from his childhood and young adulthood. As the only producer aboard during filming, Kelly Reichardt has said about Kopp, "He would become the [assistant director]. He was our grip, he learned how to do the car rigging, and he found the stand-ins and the locations. I could not have made this film without [him]." He and the other principal Old Joy crew members were nominated for the Independent Spirit John Cassavetes Award.

Kopp later produced Gus Van Sant's 2007 film Paranoid Park, which, combined with his work on Old Joy, earned him an Independent Spirit Piaget Producers Award as well as a nomination for Paranoid Park as Best Film. He also produced Kelly Reichardt's 2008 film Wendy and Lucy, also known under the working titles of Wendy and Train Choir.; and Reichardt's 2010 film Meek's Cutoff. Additionally Kopp produced Reichardt's 2013 film Night Moves; Certain Women (2016); First Cow (2019); and, most recently, Showing Up (2022).

His other work as a producer includes Macon Blair's I Don't Feel at Home In This World Anymore (2017); Ritesh Batra’s Photograph (2019); and three films by Jeremy Saulnier--Green Room (2015); Hold the Dark (2018) and Rebel Ridge (2024). Kopp was a recipient of a Sundance Institute/Amazon Studios Producer Award in 2017, and in 2020, First Cow was named best film by New York Film Critics. His films have been nominated for numerous Independent Spirit Awards, and they've screened at festivals around the world, including Cannes, Berlinale, Venice, Toronto, Sundance and Telluride.
