= Followers (2021 film) =

- Directed by: Marcus Harben
- Written by: Marcus Harben
- Produced by: Tracy Jarvis; Giles Anderson
- Starring: Harry Jarvis; Loreece Harrison; Nina Wadia; Erin Austene
- Cinematography: Alan C. McLaughlin
- Edited by: William Honeyball
- Music by: Jim Lang
- Production company: Parkhouse Pictures
- Release dates: 27 August 2021 (FrightFest); 18 March 2022 (United Kingdom)
- Running time: 87 minutes
- Country: United Kingdom
- Language: English

Followers is a 2021 British found footage horror film directed by Marcus Harben, starring Harry Jarvis, Loreece Harrison, Nina Wadia and Erin Austene.

== Premise ==
A struggling social media influencer discovers the house he shares is haunted. The ghost brings him and his friends fame and fortune, but with deadly consequences.

== Cast ==
- Harry Jarvis as Jonty Craig
- Loreece Harrison as Zauna
- Nina Wadia as Becky Dubar
- Erin Austene as Amber
- Daniel Cahill as Pete
- Dominic Watters as Jim
- Jessica Webber as Dawn
- Orion Lee as Edward Lee
- Tanya Burr as Ilana Clark

== Release ==
The film was released in the United Kingdom on 18 March 2022.

== Reception ==
Martin Unsworth of Starburst rated the film 3 stars out of 5, writing that "there’s enough wit amongst the scares to make it work." Brendan Jesus of Horror Obsessive wrote a positive review of the film, calling it "a fresh and exciting installment to the found footage subgenre."

Phil Hoad of The Guardian rated the film 2 stars out of 5, writing that the film "has a few sharp moments, but never quite reconciles its two sides to cleanly deliver the social-media skewering it’s obviously itching to." Film critic Kim Newman wrote that while the film "has a couple of creepy moments and scares", the "plot turns out to be more complex than usual, leading to a finale with revelations and stand-offs and perhaps one twist too many." Alain Elliott of Nerdly wrote a negative review of the film, writing that it "wants to be some kind of modern social media version of Paranormal Activity but it fails at every level".
