= John Magaro =

American actor (born 1983)

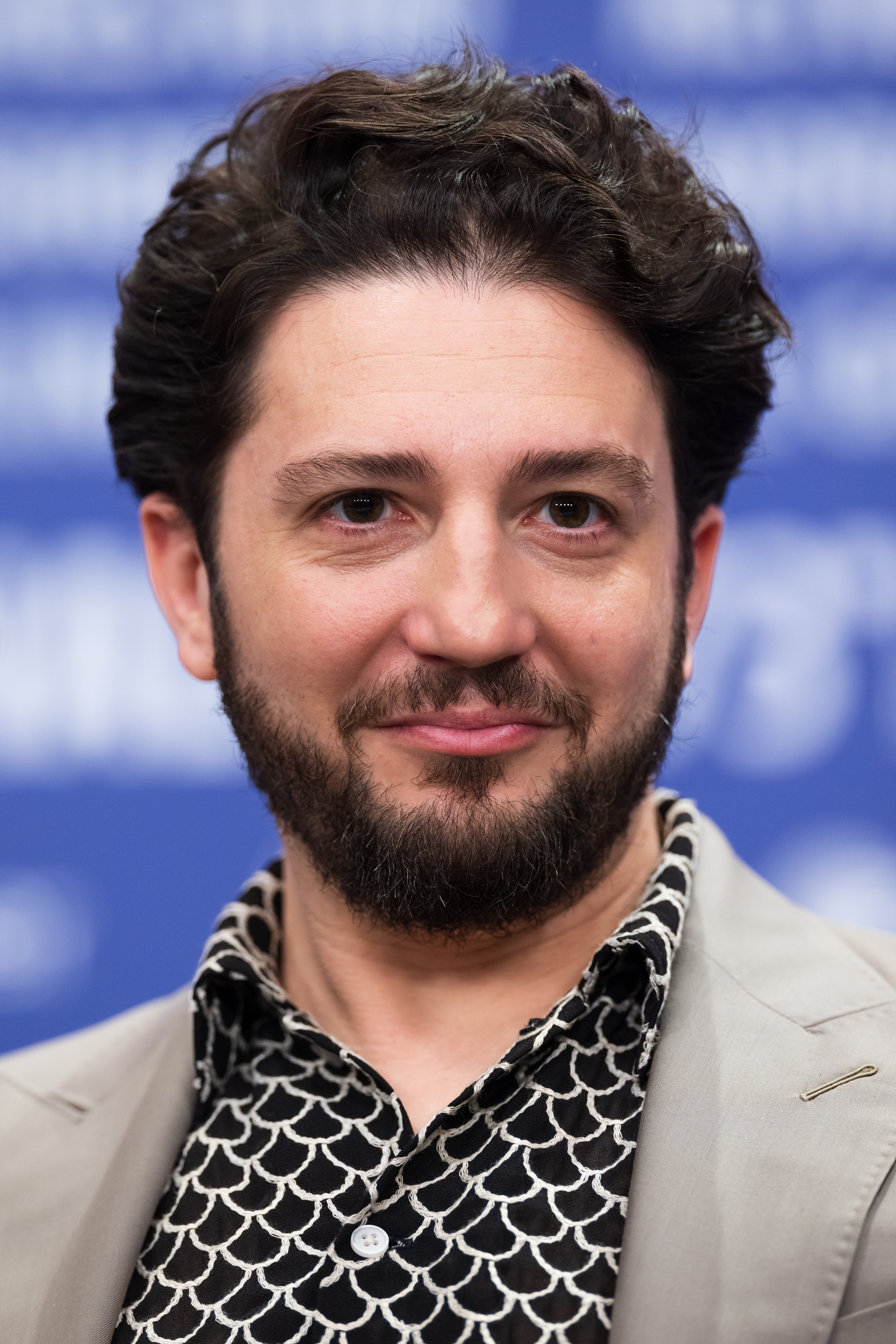
- Magaro in 2023
- Born: John Robert Magaro; February 16, 1983 (age 43); Akron, Ohio, U.S.
- Occupation: Actor
- Years active: 2005–present
- Spouse: Janice Hong
- Children: 1

John Robert Magaro (born February 16, 1983) is an American actor. He has appeared in the films Not Fade Away (2012), The Big Short (2015), Carol (2015), Overlord (2018), First Cow (2019), Showing Up (2022), The Mistress (2022), and Past Lives (2023), and in the series Orange Is the New Black (2015–2019), The Umbrella Academy (2019), and Crisis in Six Scenes (2016). He made his Broadway debut as the escaped convict Earl Williams in the revival of The Front Page in 2016.

== Early life ==
Magaro was born February 16, 1983, in Akron, Ohio, the son of Wendy and James Magaro, and grew up in nearby Munroe Falls. His father is of Italian descent and his mother is Jewish; his parents were teachers. While attending school within the Stow-Munroe Falls City School District, Magaro began acting in local theater, including shows at the Cleveland Play House and the Kent State Porthouse Theatre at Blossom Music Center, and Weathervane Playhouse in Akron. As a youth, Magaro also appeared in television commercials, and had a role in a Rescue 911 episode.

== Career ==
After graduating from Stow-Munroe Falls High School in 2001, Magaro went on to study theater at Point Park University in Pittsburgh. Among his acting highlights are The Big Short, Past Lives and Carol (2015). His early film work included The Brave One, the HBO film Taking Chance and a lead role in the horror film My Soul to Take. Magaro also appeared in eleven episodes of Orange Is the New Black, spanning seasons 3-7. In 2008, Magaro starred in the popular Walmart x Coke holiday commercial, which played in movie theaters across the country. One of Magaro's earliest appearances was as an extra in Steven Spielberg’s 2005 film Munich; he revisited the events of the 1972 Summer Olympics in 2024's September 5.

Magaro was the lead in the 2012 film Not Fade Away, which earned him the HFF Spotlight award. In 2019, he portrayed the lead role of "Cookie" in Kelly Reichardt’s critically acclaimed film First Cow, for which he was nominated for a 2020 Gotham Award as Best Actor.

== Personal life ==
Magaro is married to fashion designer Janice Hong, who gave birth to their first child, a daughter, in 2020. Magaro also struggles with an anxiety disorder.

== Filmography ==
Key
†	Denotes titles that have not yet been released

=== Film ===
Year	Title	Role	Notes
2005	Munich	Pedestrian	Uncredited extra
2007	The Brave One	Ethan	
2007	The Life Before Her Eyes	Michael Patrick	
2008	Assassination of a High School President	Cipriato	
2008	We Pedal Uphill	Kyle	
2009	The Box	Charles	
2010	My Soul to Take	Alex	
2011	Down the Shore	Martin	
2012	Liberal Arts	Dean	
2012	Not Fade Away	Douglas Damiano	
2013	Deep Powder	Cota	
2014	Unbroken	Frank A. Tinker	
2015	Don't Worry Baby	Robert Lang	
2015	Carol	Dannie McElroy	
2015	The Big Short	Charlie Geller	
2016	The Finest Hours	Ervin Maske	
2017	War Machine	Colonel Cory Staggart	
2017	Marshall	Irwin Friedman	
2018	Overlord	Private First Class Lyle Tibbet	
2019	First Cow	Otis "Cookie" Figowitz	
2020	Sylvie's Love	Sid Schuur	
2021	The Birthday Cake	Cousin Joey	
2021	18½	Paul	
2021	Lansky	Young Meyer Lansky	
2021	The Many Saints of Newark	Silvio Dante	
2022	Call Jane	Detective Chilmark	
2022	Showing Up	Sean Carr	
2022	The Mistress	Parker	
2023	Past Lives	Arthur Zaturansky	
2023	Big George Foreman	Desmond	
2023	LaRoy, Texas	Ray	Also producer
2023	Day of the Fight	Patrick	
2023	Under the Boardwalk	Manny (voice)	
2024	Psycho Therapy	Keane	
2024	September 5	Geoffrey Mason	
2025	Omaha	Dad	
2025	Köln 75	Keith Jarrett	
2025	The Mastermind	Fred	
2025	Materialists	Mark P. (voice)	Cameo
2026	The Bride!	Clyde	

=== Television ===
Year	Title	Role	Notes
2006	Conviction	Jiggy	Episode: "Denial"
2007	Law & Order	Nathan Gersh	Episode: "Talking Points"
2009	Taking Chance	Rich Brewer	TV movie
2010	Law & Order: Special Victims Unit	Andrew Hingham	Episode: "Conned"
2011	Body of Proof	Chuck Foster	Episode: "Buried Secrets"
2012	Person of Interest	Carl Elias (Age 22)	Episode: "Flesh and Blood"
2013	The Greatest Event in Television History	Paul	Episode: "Hart to Hart"
2015	Law & Order: Special Victims Unit	Keith Musio	Episode: "Institutional Fail"
2015–2016	The Good Wife	Roland Hlavin	3 episodes
2015–2019	Orange Is the New Black	Vince Muccio	11 episodes
2016	Angie Tribeca	Snick	Episode: "The Coast Is Fear"
2016	Crisis in Six Scenes	Alan Brockman	5 episodes
2018	Jack Ryan	Victor Polizzi	Recurring; 3 episodes
2019	The Umbrella Academy	Leonard Peabody / Harold Jenkins	Main role
2022	Super Pumped	John Zimmer	Episode: "War"
2024–present	The Agency	Owen Lublin	Main role

=== Theatre ===
Year	Title	Role	Venue
2016	The Front Page	Earl Williams	Broadhurst Theatre, Broadway debut

=== Video games ===
Year	Title	Voice role
2006	Bully	Sheldon
2008	Bully: Scholarship Edition	Sheldon

== Awards and nominations ==
Year	Association	Category	Project	Result	Ref.
2012	Hollywood Film Awards	Spotlight Award	Not Fade Away	Won	
2015	Screen Actors Guild Award	Outstanding Cast in a Motion Picture	The Big Short	Nominated	
2019	Florida Film Critics Circle	Best Actor	First Cow	Runner-up	
2019	Gotham Independent Film Award	Best Actor	First Cow	Nominated	
2023	Hollywood Critics Association Midseason Film Awards	Best Supporting Actor	Past Lives	Nominated	
2025	San Diego International Film Festival	Virtuoso Award	Life's work	Honored	
2025	Montclair Film Festival	Special Jury Prize	Omaha	Won	
