= Christopher Blauvelt =

American cinematographer

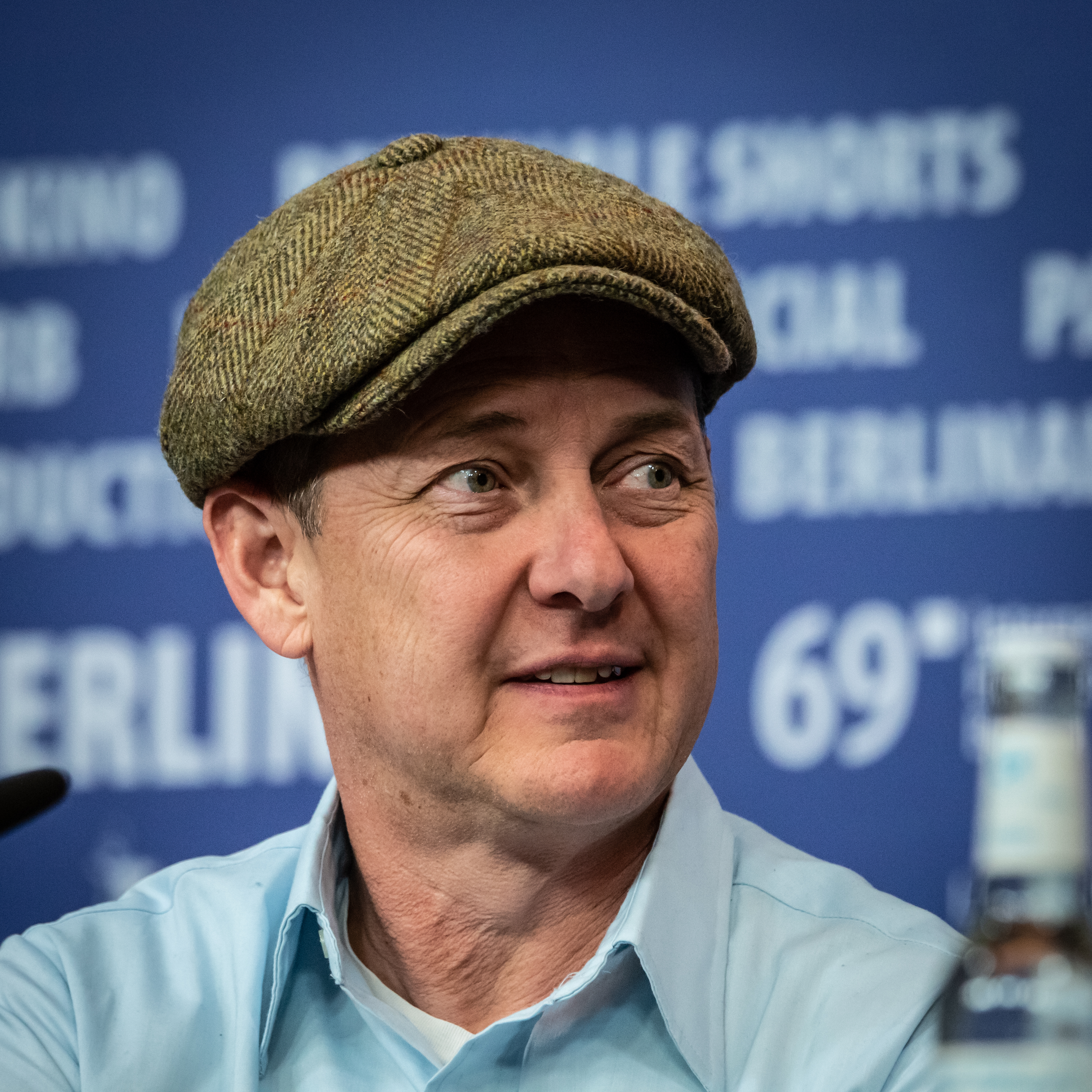
Christopher Blauvelt in 2019

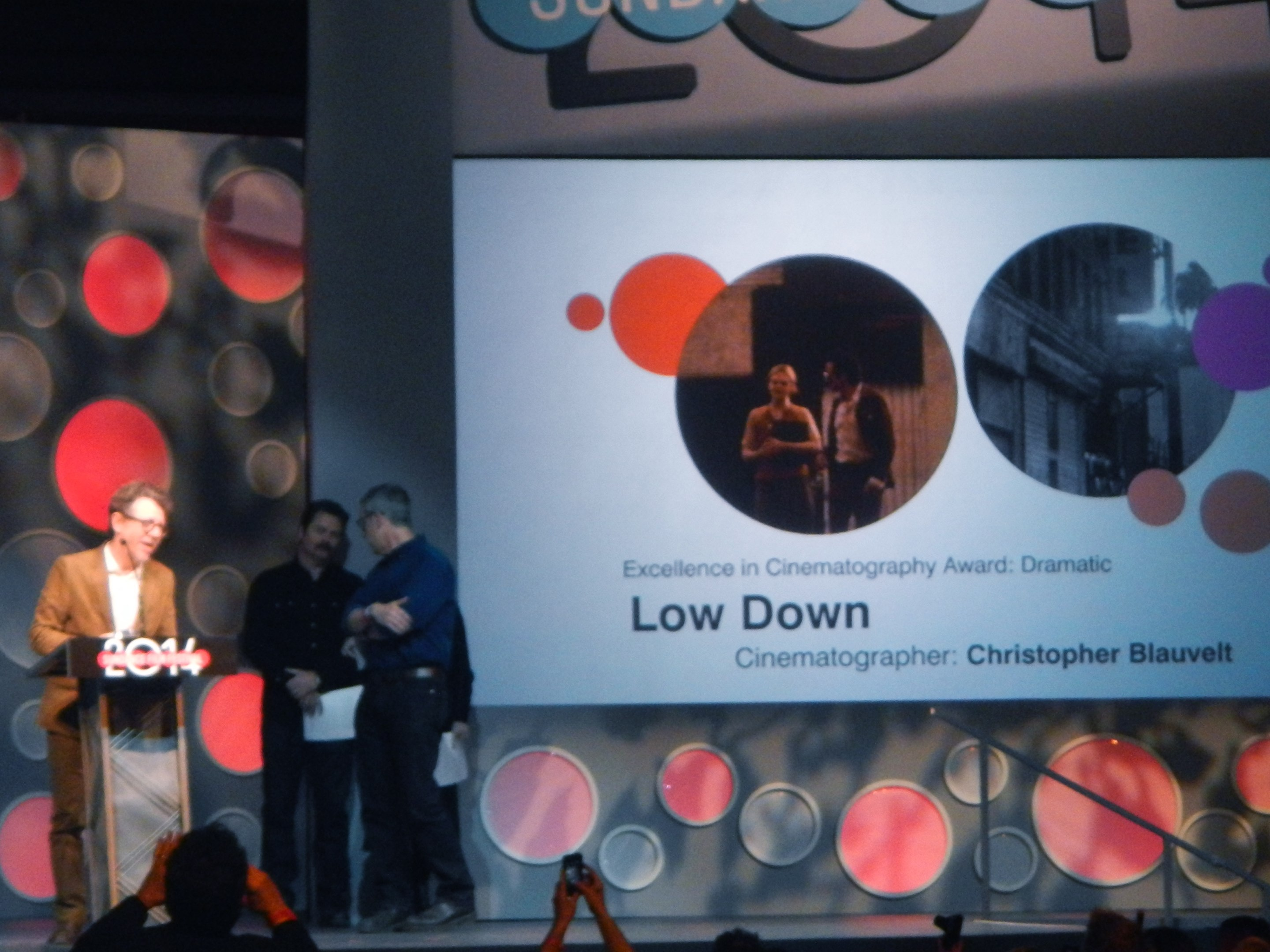
Christopher Blauvelt at the Sundance 2014 Awards Ceremony

Christopher Blauvelt is an American cinematographer, and a third generation film craftsman.

== Career ==
Blauvelt started his career in the camera and electrical department under cinematographers Harris Savides, Christopher Doyle and Lance Acord.

He continued to work with cinematographer and mentor Savides until his sudden death from brain cancer.

== Filmography ==
=== Feature film ===
Year	Title	Director	Notes
2010	Meek's Cutoff	Kelly Reichardt	
2012	Nobody Walks	Ry Russo-Young	
2012	The Discoverers	Justin Schwarz	
2013	The Bling Ring	Sofia Coppola	With Harris Savides
2013	Max Rose	Daniel Noah	
2013	Night Moves	Kelly Reichardt	
2013	The Disappearance of Eleanor Rigby	Ned Benson	
2014	Low Down	Jeff Preiss	
2014	How and Why	Charlie Kaufman	TV movie
2015	I Am Michael	Justin Kelly	
2015	Sweet Kandy	Nicholas Peate	
2016	Indignation	James Schamus	
2016	Certain Women	Kelly Reichardt	
2018	Don't Worry, He Won't Get Far on Foot	Gus Van Sant	
2018	State Like Sleep	Meredith Danluck	
2018	Mid90s	Jonah Hill	
2019	The Dead Ones	Jeremy Kasten	
2019	First Cow	Kelly Reichardt	
2020	Emma.	Autumn de Wilde	
2022	Warm Blood	Rick Charnoski	Also executive producer
2022	Showing Up	Kelly Reichardt	
2022	What Remains	Ran Huang	
2023	May December	Todd Haynes	
2025	Hot Milk	Rebecca Lenkiewicz	With Si Bell
2025	The Mastermind	Kelly Reichardt	

Documentary film

Year	Title	Director	Notes
2022	Stutz	Jonah Hill	
2023	Ignore Heroes - The True Sounds of Liberty	Jack Grisham	With Kenneth Vatan-Woodall
2026	IPI	Yasmin Hed	

=== Music video ===
Cinematographer

Year	Title	Artist	Director	Ref.
2007	"Pennywhistle"	ALOKE	Jack Patrick	
2013	"Stay"	Tiny Hearts	Justin Kelly	
	"Glory to the World"	El Perro Del Mar	Emily De Groot	
	"Working Class Hero"	Green Day	Samuel Bayer	
	"Underdog"	Turin Brakes	Sophie Muller	
2016	"Dark Necessities"	Red Hot Chili Peppers	Olivia Wilde	

Director

Year	Title	Artist	Ref.
2020	"Deleter"	Grouplove	
2020	"Youth"	Grouplove	

== Awards ==
For his work on Meek's Cutoff, Blauvelt earned an ICP Nomination, and best cinematography at the Valladolid International Film Festival for Night Moves.

In 2012, Variety hailed him as a "Cinematographer to Watch". In 2013, Indiewire also listed him as a "Cinematographer to Watch".

In 2014, Blauvelt won the Dramatic Cinematography award at the Sundance Film Festival, for Low Down.
