= Jonathan Raymond =

American writer (born 1971)

Jon Raymond
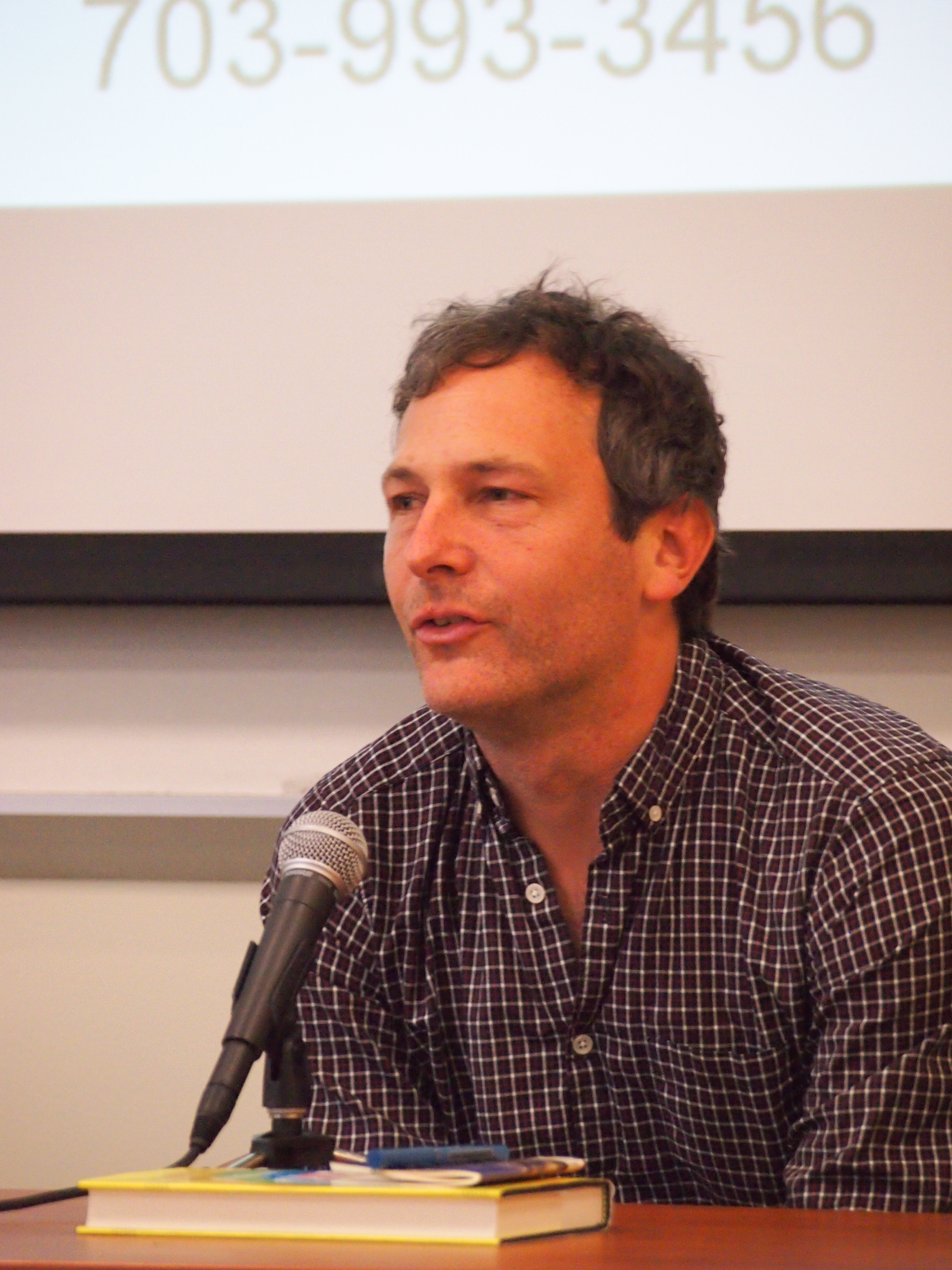
- Raymond in 2017
- Born: June 26, 1971 (age 55); San Francisco, California, U.S.
- Education: Swarthmore College (BA); The New School (MFA)

Jonathan Raymond (born June 26, 1971), usually credited Jon Raymond, is an American writer living in Portland, Oregon. He is best known for writing the novels The Half-Life and Rain Dragon, and for writing the short stories and novels adapted for the films Old Joy, Wendy and Lucy, and First Cow, all directed by Kelly Reichardt, with whom he co-wrote the screenplays.

As a screenwriter, Raymond wrote the original scripts for Meek's Cutoff and Night Moves. He was nominated for a Primetime Emmy for his teleplay writing on the HBO miniseries Mildred Pierce.

== Early life and education ==
Raymond grew up in Lake Grove, Oregon, and attended Lake Oswego High School. He graduated from Swarthmore College. He received his MFA from The New School in New York City.

== Career ==
=== Fiction ===
He published his first novel, The Half-Life in May 2004, which was released by Bloomsbury. The novel takes place in Oregon and revolves around two parallel storylines: the cook Cookie Figowitz meeting with the refugee Henry Brown in 1820s Oregon, and 160 years later (1980), Tina Plank befriending Trixie, a girl with a troubled past. The novel won a Publishers Weekly "Best Book of 2004" award.

In 2008, Raymond published his first collection of short stories, entitled Livability, which won the Oregon Book Award's Ken Kesey Award for Fiction in 2009. The collection was also a Barnes & Noble "Discover Great New Writer’s" selection. Three stories from that collection ("Old Joy", "Train Choir", and "The Suckling Pig") were adapted into feature films.

"Old Joy", a 2004 short story Raymond wrote that was inspired by the photography of Justine Kurland, became adapted into the 2006 film Old Joy, directed by Kelly Reichardt and starring musician Will Oldham. The film premiered at the 2006 Sundance Film Festival and won awards from the Los Angeles Film Critics Association, the Rotterdam International Film Festival, the Sarasota Film Festival and the Independent Spirit Awards (producer Neil Kopp won the Producer's Award), and was on various "Top 10 Films of 2006" lists including those from LA Weekly, Portland Oregonian, The A.V. Club, The Boston Globe, and Entertainment Weekly.

Raymond's story "Train Choir" was adapted into the 2008 feature film Wendy and Lucy, also directed by Kelly Reichardt and starring Michelle Williams, and which had its world premiere at the 2008 Cannes Film Festival. The film won both Best Picture and Best Actress (for Williams) at the 12th Toronto Film Critics Association Awards. Wendy and Lucy was also placed at #87 on Slant Magazine's best films of the 2000s, and also appeared on many "Top 10 Films of 2008" lists, including those of the Chicago Reader, New York Post, Newsweek, The Austin Chronicle, LA Weekly, The Philadelphia Inquirer, the Seattle Post-Intelligencer, Entertainment Weekly, The New York Times, The Oregonian, Slate, The Village Voice, and The Christian Science Monitor.

In 2012, Raymond also published a second novel, Rain Dragon, which revolves around the character of Damon and his girlfriend Amy, who have had enough of Los Angeles and decide to leave the city to work on a community farm.

"The Suckling Pig", a third story from Livability, was adapted into the 2023 film Earthlings by Steven Doughton, and premiered at the Göteborg Film Festival in Sweden.

=== Screenwriting ===
Raymond has co-written, with the director Kelly Reichardt, the screenplays for two of her films based on his short stories, Old Joy (2006) and Wendy and Lucy (2008), as well as for First Cow (2019), based on his novel The Half Life. For Old Joy, he was nominated, along with the director and producers of the film, for a John Cassavetes Award from the 2007 Independent Spirit Awards.

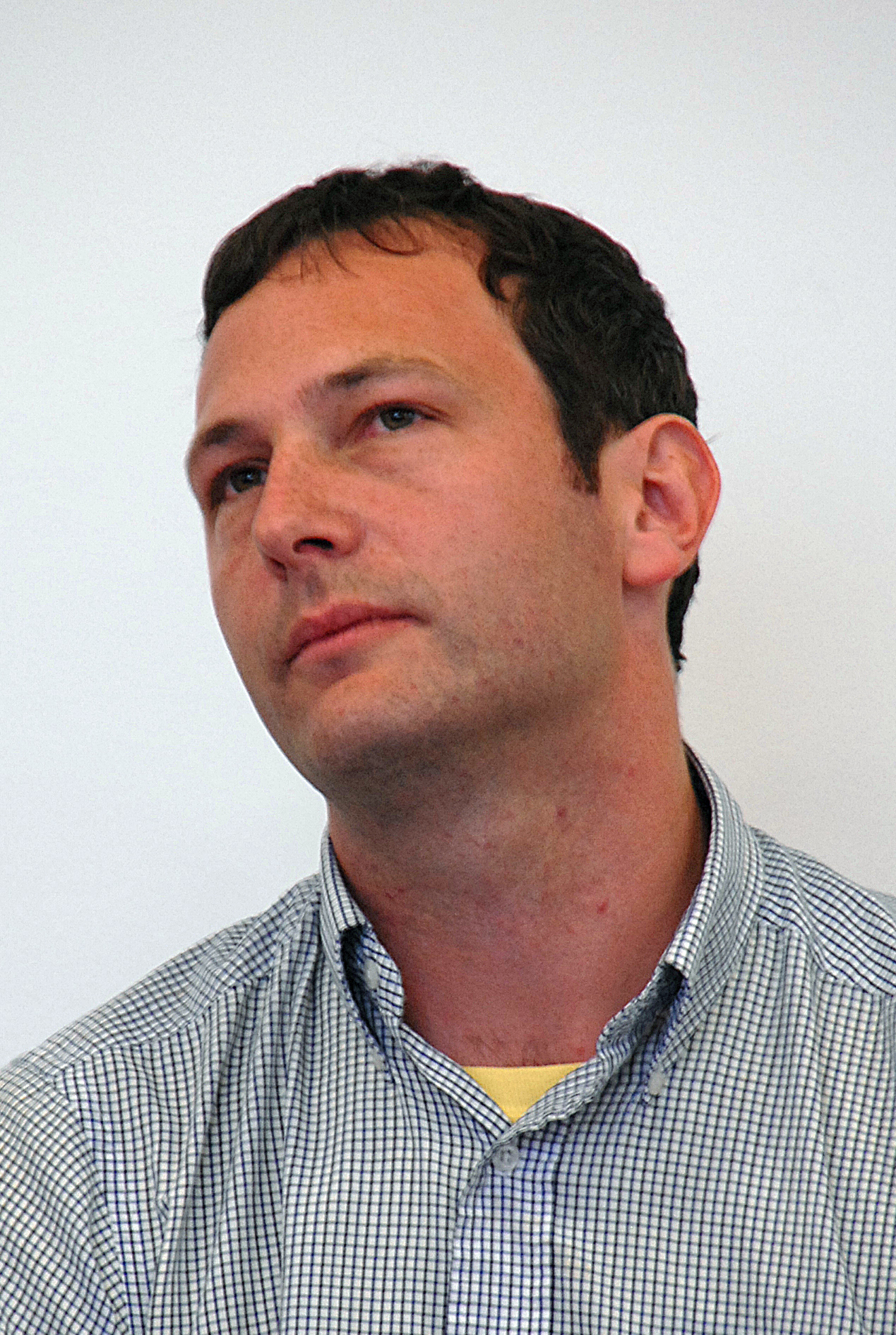
Raymond in 2010

Raymond also wrote the screenplay for Reichardt's 2010 western Meek's Cutoff, which competed for the Golden Lion at the 67th Venice International Film Festival. Raymond was nominated for a Humanitas Prize at the 2011 Sundance Film Festival for his screenplay, and the film received a "Best Film" nomination from the 2011 Gotham Independent Film Awards.

Raymond again worked with Reichardt on the screenplay for her film Night Moves in 2013. The film was shown in the main competition section of the 70th Venice International Film Festival in 2013 and at the 2013 Toronto International Film Festival.

Raymond collaborated on the screenplay for another of Reichardt's films, First Cow which premiered at the Telluride Film Festival in 2019. The film was also chosen to compete for the Golden Bear in the main competition section at the 70th Berlin International Film Festival in 2020.

=== Teleplays and television writing ===
Raymond also co-wrote all the teleplays for all five episodes of the 2011 HBO miniseries, Mildred Pierce, directed and also co-written by Todd Haynes based on James M. Cain's novel, and starring Kate Winslet as the title character. For his writing work on the show, Raymond was nominated for a Primetime Emmy for "Outstanding Writing for a Miniseries, Movie or a Dramatic Special" (shared with Todd Haynes).

=== Other work ===
Raymond's professional duties include co-editing Tin House, editing Plazm, art criticism for Artforum and Modern Painters, and teaching through The New School. Raymond's writing has also appeared in Bookforum, the Village Voice, and other publications.

Raymond produced the 2012 feature film, Buoy, directed by Steven Doughton and starring Matthew Del Negro and Tina Holmes. He has also served as the assistant to Writer/Director Todd Haynes on the set of his 2002 film, Far From Heaven, starring Julianne Moore and Dennis Quaid. Raymond used the name "Slats Grobnik" (a character created by Chicago newspaper columnist Mike Royko) when he worked as Haynes' assistant on Far From Heaven, and Roger Ebert noticed this deep in the credits and wrote about it in his "Movie Yearbook 2004."

== Books ==
- Old Joy (2004), short story (collected 2008 in Livability) with photographs by Justine Kurland, ISBN 978-1-891273-05-6
- The Half-Life: A Novel (2004), ISBN 978-1-58234-578-9 (2005 paperback)
  - Publishers Weekly "Best Book of 2004" award
- Livability: Stories (2008), ISBN 978-1-59691-655-5
  - Oregon Book Award's Ken Kesey Award for Fiction in 2009
  - Barnes & Noble "Discover Great New Writer’s" selection
- Rain Dragon: A Novel (2012), ISBN 978-1-60819-679-1
- Freebird: A Novel (2017), ISBN 978-1-55597-760-3
- Denial: A Novel (2022) ISBN 978-1-98218-183-3
- God and Sex: A Novel (2025) ISBN 978-1668084915

== Screenplays ==
- Old Joy (2006) (with Kelly Reichardt) (based on the short story "Old Joy" in his 2008 collection Livability)
  - John Cassavetes Award Nomination from the 2007 Independent Spirit Awards
- Wendy and Lucy (2008) (with Kelly Reichardt) (based on the short story "Train Choir" in his 2008 collection Livability)
- Meek's Cutoff (2010) (with Kelly Reichardt)
  - 2011 Sundance Film Festival Humanitas Award Nomination
- Night Moves (2013) (with Kelly Reichardt)
- First Cow (2019) (with Kelly Reichardt) (based on his 2004 novel The Half-Life)
- Showing Up (2022) (with Kelly Reichardt)
- Earthlings (2023) (with Steven Doughton) (based on the short story "The Suckling Pig" in his 2008 collection Livability)
- De Noche (TBA) (with Todd Haynes)

== Teleplays ==
- Mildred Pierce (2011) (teleplays for all five episodes, Part One to Part Five)
  - Primetime Emmy Nomination for "Outstanding Writing for a Miniseries, Movie or a Dramatic Special" (shared with Todd Haynes)

== Awards and nominations ==
- For The Half-Life: A Novel: Publishers Weekly "Best Book of 2004" Award
- For Livability (Short story collection): Oregon Book Award's Ken Kesey for Fiction in 2009 and Barnes & Noble "Discover Great New Writer’s" selection
- For Mildred Pierce: 2011 Primetime Emmy Nomination for "Outstanding Writing for a Miniseries, Movie or a Dramatic Special" (shared with Todd Haynes)
- For Meek's Cutoff screenplay, 2011 Sundance Film Festival Humanitas Award Nomination
