= Toronto Film Critics Association Awards 2008 =

Annual Canadian film awards ceremony

12th TFCA Awards

December 17, 2008

Best Film:
Wendy and Lucy

The 12th Toronto Film Critics Association Awards, honoring the best in film for 2008, were given on December 17, 2008.

== Winners ==
- Best Actor:
  - Mickey Rourke – The Wrestler

Runners-Up: Sean Penn – Milk and Jean-Claude Van Damme – JCVD

- Best Actress:
  - Michelle Williams – Wendy and Lucy

Runners-Up: Anne Hathaway – Rachel Getting Married and Meryl Streep – Doubt

- Best Animated Film:
  - WALL-E

Runners-Up: Kung Fu Panda, Persepolis and Waltz with Bashir

- Best Director:
  - Jonathan Demme – Rachel Getting Married

Runners-Up: Danny Boyle – Slumdog Millionaire and Andrew Stanton – WALL-E

- Best Documentary Film:
  - Man on Wire

Runners-Up: Standard Operating Procedure and Up the Yangtze

- Best Film:
  - Wendy and Lucy

Runners-Up: Rachel Getting Married and WALL-E

- Best First Feature:
  - Ballast

Runners-Up: The Band's Visit and Frozen River

- Best Foreign Language Film:
  - Let the Right One In • Sweden

Runners-Up: A Christmas Tale • France, The Class • France and I've Loved You So Long • France/Germany

- Best Screenplay:
  - Rachel Getting Married – Jenny Lumet

Runners-Up: Doubt – John Patrick Shanley and Frost/Nixon – Peter Morgan

- Best Supporting Actor:
  - Heath Ledger – The Dark Knight

Runners-Up: Josh Brolin – Milk, Robert Downey Jr. – Tropic Thunder and Philip Seymour Hoffman – Doubt

- Best Supporting Actress:
  - Rosemarie DeWitt – Rachel Getting Married

Runners-Up: Penélope Cruz – Vicky Cristina Barcelona and Viola Davis – Doubt

- Rogers Canadian Film Award:
  - My Winnipeg

Runners-Up: Continental, a Film Without Guns (Continental, un film sans fusil) and Up the Yangtze
