= Certain Women (film) =

2016 American drama film by Kelly Reichardt

- Theatrical release poster
- Directed by: Kelly Reichardt
- Screenplay by: Kelly Reichardt
- Based on: "Native Sandstone", "Travis, B.", and "Tome" by Maile Meloy
- Produced by: Neil Kopp; Vincent Savino; Anish Savjani
- Starring: Laura Dern; Kristen Stewart; Michelle Williams; Lily Gladstone; James Le Gros; Jared Harris; René Auberjonois
- Cinematography: Christopher Blauvelt
- Edited by: Kelly Reichardt
- Music by: Jeff Grace
- Production company: Filmscience
- Distributed by: IFC Films (United States); Stage 6 Films (International)
- Release dates: January 24, 2016 (Sundance Film Festival); October 14, 2016 (United States)
- Running time: 107 minutes
- Country: United States
- Language: English
- Budget: $2 million
- Box office: $1.5 million

Certain Women is a 2016 American drama film edited, written, and directed by Kelly Reichardt. Based on "Native Sandstone", "Travis, B." and "Tome"—three short stories from Maile Meloy's collections Half in Love and Both Ways Is the Only Way I Want It—it stars Laura Dern, Kristen Stewart, Michelle Williams, Lily Gladstone, James Le Gros, and Jared Harris.

The film premiered at the 2016 Sundance Film Festival on January 24, 2016, and was released theatrically in the United States on October 14, 2016, by IFC Films. It grossed $1,068,054 domestically, making it Reichardt's highest-grossing film at the time.

== Plot ==
In Livingston, Montana, attorney Laura Wells has been dealing with a disgruntled client, Fuller, for eight months. Unemployed due to a workplace injury that rendered him disabled, he has taken to visiting Laura repeatedly at her office. Since Fuller will not listen to her advice, she takes him to another lawyer. After assessing the case, the lawyer tells Fuller exactly what Laura had told him; that while Fuller's company was clearly at fault for his injuries, Fuller can no longer sue the company, because he previously had accepted their initial small settlement. On his way home from the meeting with the second lawyer, Fuller feuds with his wife, is kicked out of their car, and flags Laura down to ride back to Livingston with her. On the way, he tells Laura that he wants to shoot his former employers.

Late that same night, Laura is called by the police: Fuller has gone to his former place of employment and has taken a security guard hostage. After being prepped by the police, Laura agrees to enter the building and talk to Fuller. She enters, finds Fuller with his hostage, and at Fuller's directive, locates his employee file, which includes the case review used by the company to settle his disability claim. Fuller has Laura read the entire file, which details clearly how Fuller was cheated out of his rightful settlement. Fuller decides to let the guard go; he asks Laura to stall for him by going to the front and telling the police of his demands as if he has a gun pointed at her, while he slips out the back. Instead, Laura immediately tells the police where Fuller is and he is arrested.

Gina and Ryan Lewis are a married couple with a teenage daughter, building their own rural home from the ground up. Gina feels that Ryan constantly undermines her with their daughter. Ryan is also having an affair with Laura Wells. On their way home from the campsite of their new home, they decide to stop at the home of Albert, an elderly man they know, to try to persuade him to sell them a pile of sandstone blocks on his property. As they talk, Gina tries to persuade Albert to sell her the sandstone, but he seems unfocused and only interested in talking with Ryan. Eventually, Albert tentatively agrees to give the sandstone to Gina and Ryan. Gina, who has been secretly recording the conversation, signals that they should leave. In the car on their way home, Gina complains about Ryan's lack of support during the negotiation and they debate whether taking the sandstone is the right decision.

Sometime later, Gina and Ryan arrive and load up a truck full of sandstone. She notices Albert watching from his window and waves at him but he does not wave back.

Jamie is a ranch hand living in isolation during the winter, tending to horses on a farm outside of Belfry. Heading into town one night, she sees cars turning into the school and follows them. She learns that she has stumbled onto a class on education law taught by a young lawyer, Beth Travis. Jamie goes out to eat with Beth after class. Beth explains that she lives in Livingston, a four-hour drive away, so she must make the eight-hour round trip twice a week to make it back in time for her real job.

Despite having no interest in education law, Jamie returns to class week after week. One week, she brings one of her horses to class, and she and Beth ride the horse to the diner. The following week, she is stunned to find that Beth has quit and a new teacher is brought in as a permanent replacement. She immediately leaves the class and drives straight to Livingston. Spending the night in her car, she spends the morning driving to law offices hoping to find Beth. On the way, she has flashbacks of the previous time she drove to the city. Locating her address, Jamie sees Beth in the parking lot and tells her that she drove over knowing that if she didn't, she would never see her again. Beth fails to respond and Jamie leaves, dejected. On her way home, she falls asleep at the wheel and drives into an empty field.

Laura visits Fuller in prison. He says he understands how she acted and asks her to answer his letters just so as not to feel so lonely. She agrees. Gina has a barbecue with friends at her land and her husband appreciates her work. She looks at the sandstone and smiles. Jamie continues working at the ranch.

== Cast ==
- Laura Dern as Laura Wells, an attorney
- Kristen Stewart as Elizabeth "Beth" Travis, an attorney
- Michelle Williams as Gina Lewis
- Lily Gladstone as Jamie, a rancher
- James LeGros as Ryan Lewis, Gina's husband
- Jared Harris as William "Will" Fuller, Laura's client
- René Auberjonois as Albert
- John Getz as Sheriff Rowles
- Sara Rodier as Guthrie Lewis, Gina's daughter
- Ashlie Atkinson as Secretary
- James Jordan as Hostage Specialist

== Production ==
Reichardt had previously shot most of her feature-film work in Oregon and wanted a change of setting. She intertwined three of Meloy's short stories set in Montana, and after scouting locations, felt that Livingston, rather than Meloy's hometown of Helena, was ideal for the film's look. The production team included Neil Kopp and Vincent Savino with Todd Haynes as executive producer. The principals, including two-time collaborator Michelle Williams, were cast in 2015. Haynes noted that the cinematography in the film compartmentalized the women's lives—the isolation and loneliness they felt—even though each story dealt with relationships. To emphasize this, Reichardt set up shots with door frames, windows, mirrors, and architectural structures separating and fragmenting her characters in the frame. She used location sounds, such as wind and train whistles, throughout the film; only one scene has a film score.

== Release ==
Certain Women had its world premiere at the 2016 Sundance Film Festival on January 24, 2016. Shortly after, IFC Films acquired U.S distribution rights to the film. Prior to the Sundance premiere, Sony Pictures Worldwide Acquisitions, under its Stage 6 Films banner, acquired international distribution rights to the film. The film then screened at the Toronto International Film Festival, the New York Film Festival, and The Art of Brooklyn Film Festival. The film was released on October 14, 2016.

== Reception ==
=== Critical response ===
On the review aggregator website Rotten Tomatoes, 92% of 198 critics' reviews are positive, with an average rating of 7.8/10. The website's consensus reads: "Certain Women further demonstrates writer-director Kelly Reichardt's gift for telling the stories of ordinary people with uncommon empathy and skill." On Metacritic, the film has a weighted average score of 82 out of 100, based on 38 critics, indicating "universal acclaim".

Noel Murray at The Playlist graded it an A− and called the film "utterly enthralling" while praising the "mesmerizing effect" of the slow pacing. Guy Lodge of Variety warmly praised the film with particular plaudits to director Reichardt, calling her the "quietest of great American filmmakers". Nigel M. Smith of The Guardian gave the film 4 out of 5 stars, and praised Reichardt as "a master at slow-burning, melancholic dramas". Leslie Felperin at The Hollywood Reporter was more mixed on the film praising the final section of the film as an "exquisite tale" and especially enjoying "luminous newcomer" Lily Gladstone but called the film as a whole "a trifle academic and dry".

In France Les Cahiers du cinéma placed the film third on their 2017 Top Ten chart (after Twin Peaks and Jeannette: The Childhood of Joan of Arc).

=== Accolades ===
List of awards and nominations
Award	Date of ceremony	Category	Recipient(s)	Result	Ref.
Alliance of Women Film Journalists	December 21, 2016	Best Woman Director	Kelly Reichardt	Nominated	
Alliance of Women Film Journalists	December 21, 2016	Best Woman Screenwriter	Kelly Reichardt	Won	
Boston Society of Film Critics	December 11, 2016	Best Supporting Actress	Lily Gladstone	Won	
Boston Society of Film Critics	December 11, 2016	Best Cast	The cast of Certain Women	Runner-up	
Chicago Film Critics Association	December 15, 2016	Best Supporting Actress	Lily Gladstone	Nominated	
Chicago Film Critics Association	December 15, 2016	Most Promising Performer	Lily Gladstone	Nominated	
Florida Film Critics Circle	December 23, 2016	Best Supporting Actress	Lily Gladstone	Nominated	
Gotham Awards	November 28, 2016	Best Feature	Certain Women	Nominated	
Gotham Awards	November 28, 2016	Breakthrough Actor	Lily Gladstone	Nominated	
Gotham Awards	November 28, 2016	Audience Award	Certain Women	Nominated	
Independent Spirit Awards	February 25, 2017	Best Director	Kelly Reichardt	Nominated	
Independent Spirit Awards	February 25, 2017	Best Supporting Female	Lily Gladstone	Nominated	
IndieWire Critics Poll	December 19, 2016	Best Director	Kelly Reichardt	7th Place	
IndieWire Critics Poll	December 19, 2016	Best Supporting Actress	Lily Gladstone	Won	
IndieWire Critics Poll	December 19, 2016	Best Supporting Actress	Kristen Stewart	8th Place	
London Film Festival	October 16, 2016	Best Film	Certain Women	Won	
Los Angeles Film Critics Association	December 4, 2016	Best Supporting Actress	Lily Gladstone	Won	
National Society of Film Critics	January 7, 2017	Best Supporting Actress	Lily Gladstone	2nd Place	
New York Film Critics Circle	December 1, 2016	Best Supporting Actress	Michelle Williams (also for Manchester by the Sea)	Won	
Online Film Critics Society	January 3, 2017	Best Supporting Actress	Lily Gladstone	Nominated	
San Diego Film Critics Society	December 12, 2016	Best Supporting Actress	Lily Gladstone	Nominated	
San Diego Film Critics Society	December 12, 2016	Breakthrough Artist	Lily Gladstone	Won	
San Francisco Film Critics Circle	December 11, 2016	Best Supporting Actress	Lily Gladstone	Nominated	
St. Louis Gateway Film Critics Association	December 18, 2016	Best Supporting Actress	Lily Gladstone	Nominated	
Women Film Critics Circle	December 19, 2016	Best Movie about Women	Certain Women	Nominated	
Women Film Critics Circle	December 19, 2016	Best Movie by a Woman	Certain Women	Nominated	
Women Film Critics Circle	December 19, 2016	Best Woman Storyteller	Kelly Reichardt	Nominated	
Women Film Critics Circle	December 19, 2016	Best Female Images in a Movie	Certain Women	Nominated	
Women Film Critics Circle	December 19, 2016	Courage in Filmmaking	Kelly Reichardt	Nominated	
Women Film Critics Circle	December 19, 2016	Courage in Acting	Lily Gladstone	Nominated	
Women Film Critics Circle	December 19, 2016	The Invisible Woman Award	Lily Gladstone	Nominated	
