= Kelly Reichardt =

American film director and screenwriter (born 1964)

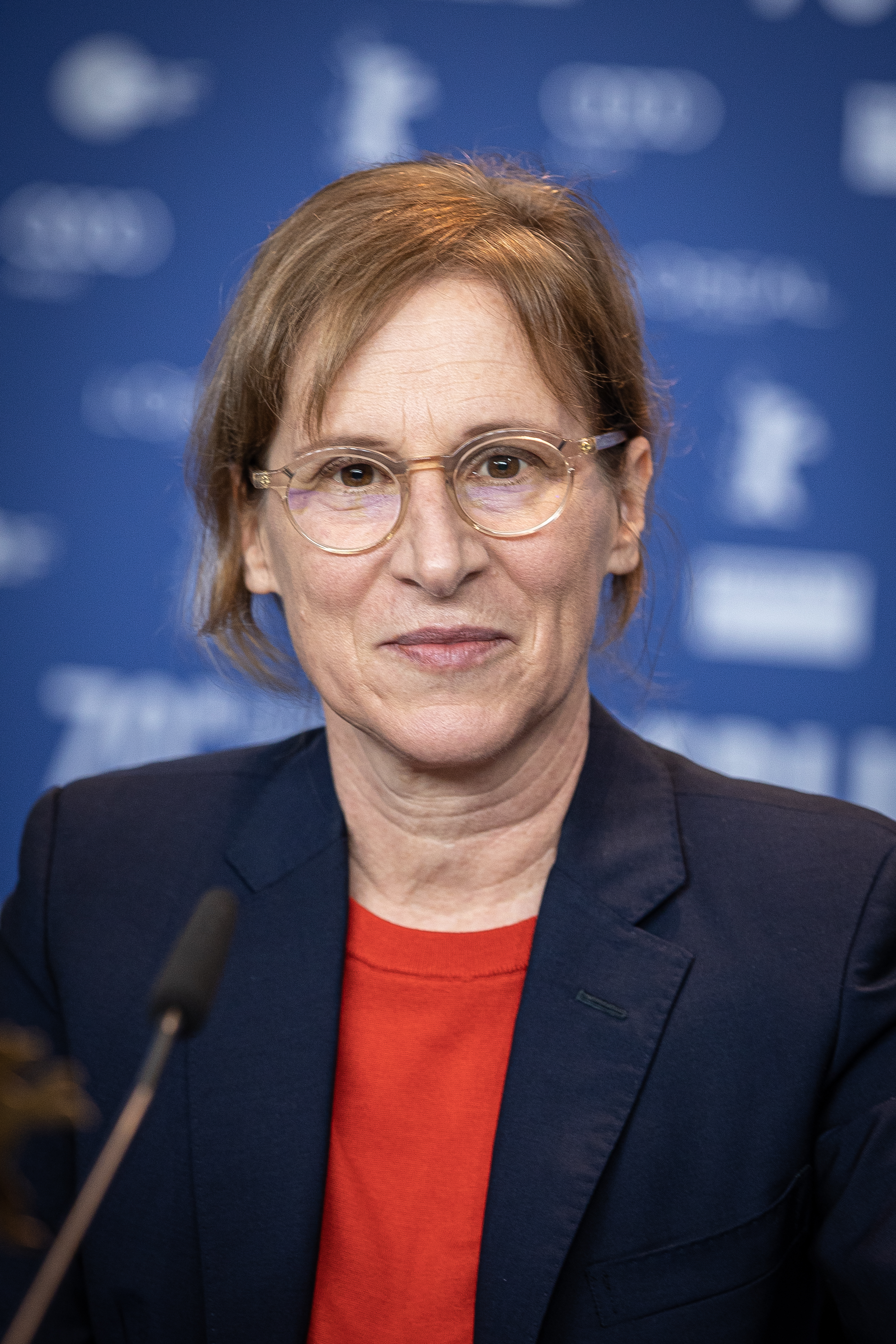
- Reichardt in 2020
- Born: March 3, 1964 (age 62); Miami, Florida, U.S.
- Education: School of the Museum of Fine Arts (MFA)
- Occupations: Film director, screenwriter
- Years active: 1994–present

Kelly Reichardt (/ˈraɪkɑːrt/ RYE-kart; born March 3, 1964) is an American film director, film editor and screenwriter. She is known for her minimalist films closely associated with slow cinema, many of which deal with working-class characters in small, rural communities.

Reichardt made her feature film debut with River of Grass (1994) and subsequently directed a series of films set and filmed in Oregon: the dramas Old Joy (2006) and Wendy and Lucy (2008); the Western Meek's Cutoff (2010); and the thriller Night Moves (2013). In 2016, she wrote and directed the Montana-set drama Certain Women. Since 2019, Reichardt has returned to directing Oregon-set dramas, with First Cow (2019) and Showing Up (2022). Reichardt's ninth film, The Mastermind, premiered at the 2025 Cannes Film Festival.

== Early life and education ==
Reichardt was raised in Miami, Florida. Her mother was a narcotics agent, and her father was a crime-scene technician. They separated when she was still a child. She developed a passion for photography when she was young, working with her father's crime-scene camera. As a child, she took classes at the Bob Rich School of Photography, which by 1995 had become the biggest video porn store in Miami. She earned her MFA at the School of the Museum of Fine Arts in Boston. Reichardt has served as the S. William Senfeld Artist in Residence at Bard College since 2006.

== Film career ==
=== 1994–2006: Feature debut and other works ===
Reichardt's debut film River of Grass was released in 1994. It was nominated for three Independent Spirit Awards, and the Grand Jury Prize at the Sundance Film Festival. It was named one of the best films of 1995 by the Boston Globe, Film Comment, and The Village Voice. Reichardt then had trouble making another feature film, saying, "I had 10 years from the mid-1990s when I couldn't get a movie made. It had a lot to do with being a woman. That's definitely a factor in raising money. During that time, it was impossible to get anything going, so I just said, 'Fuck you!' and did Super 8 shorts instead."

In 1999, Reichardt completed the short film Ode, based on the 1976 film Ode to Billy Joe (which was in turn based on the Bobbie Gentry song "Ode to Billie Joe"). Next she made two more short films: Then a Year, in 2001, and Travis, which deals with the Iraq War, in 2004. In these two films, critics have noted that she subtly makes clear her displeasure with the Bush administration and its handling of the Iraq War.

Reichardt met and subsequently became close friends with fellow filmmaker Todd Haynes in 1991, during the production of his film Poison. She worked on this film as a key set dresser and props master. After Haynes made Safe, four years later in 1995, she drove Haynes to Portland from the Seattle Film Festival, where she met writer Jon Raymond and Neil Kopp, who would go on to, respectively, write and produce several of Reichardt's films. Raymond has been cited as the largest influence on Reichardt's decision to base her films in the Pacific Northwest, his specific humanist portraits of the region inspiring her. In 2006, she completed Old Joy, based on a short story in Raymond's collection Livability. Daniel London and singer-songwriter Will Oldham portray two friends who reunite for a camping trip to the Cascades and Bagby Hot Springs, near Portland. The film won awards from the Los Angeles Film Critics Association, Rotterdam International Film Festival, and Sarasota Film Festival. It was the first American film to win the Tiger Award at the Rotterdam Film Festival. Kopp won the Producer's Award at the 2007 Independent Spirit Awards for his work on Old Joy and Paranoid Park.

=== 2008–2016: Critical acclaim ===
For her next film, Wendy and Lucy, Reichardt and Raymond adapted another story from Livability. The film explores loneliness and hopelessness through the story of a woman looking for her lost dog. It was released in December 2008 and earned Oscar buzz for lead actress Michelle Williams. It was nominated for Best Film and Best Female Lead at the Independent Spirit Awards. Reichardt then directed Meek's Cutoff, a Western also starring Williams. It competed for the Golden Lion at the 67th Venice International Film Festival in 2010.

Reichardt received a John Simon Guggenheim Memorial Foundation Fellowship in 2009 and a 2011 United States Artists (USA) Fellowship. She edits her films herself. In 2014, Reichardt was named an Artist-in-Residence in the Film and Electronic Arts program at Bard College.

In 2013, her film Night Moves debuted in competition at the 70th Venice International Film Festival. An intense thriller about a secret plot to blow up a dam which was also written by Raymond, it was considered a shift in tone from her other slower, more melancholic films. It was also the first time that Reichardt employed digital cinematography.

Reichardt's film Certain Women is based on Maile Meloy's 2009 short-story collection Both Ways is the Only Way I Want It, and was shot in March–April 2015 in Montana. Michelle Williams, Laura Dern, Lily Gladstone, and Kristen Stewart star. Sony Pictures Worldwide Acquisitions (SPWA) bought the rights to distribution. The film premiered on January 24, 2016, at the Sundance Film Festival, and earned Reichardt the top award at the 2016 London Film Festival. Reichardt talked about her creative vision for Certain Women in an interview with Filmmaker Magazine in 2016, saying that she initially hoped to shoot on film rather than digitally, but logistics prevented it. She cited the painters Milton Avery, Alice Neel and Stephen Shore as visual inspiration for the film.

In October 2016, Reichardt revealed that on her next film she would collaborate with author Patrick DeWitt on an adaptation of his novel Undermajordomo Minor, potentially to be shot outside of the U.S. Two years later it was announced that Reichardt had put Undermajordomo Minor on hold and would instead reunite with Raymond to direct First Cow, an adaptation of his novel The Half-Life.

=== 2019–present ===
First Cow debuted at the 2019 Telluride Film Festival, it was screened at the 2019 New York Film Festival, and in February 2020 was selected to the main competition of the 70th Berlin International Film Festival. It was Reichardt's return to films set in Oregon after shooting Certain Women in Montana. Released by A24 to a limited number of theaters in March 2020, the film was pulled from distribution due to the onset of the COVID-19 pandemic and became a video on demand title in June 2020.

Reichardt's next film, Showing Up, was filmed and set in Portland, with Williams in the lead role as a sculptor. It premiered at the 2022 Cannes Film Festival, and was the director's first feature to be included in the main competition for the Palme d'Or. The film was released by A24 in the United States on April 7, 2023.

Reichardt's films have largely received positive reviews from critics, with River of Grass and First Cow particularly reaching near-unanimous acclaim. Her films have not been big box-office successes, with Certain Women the most successful at $1.1 million.

The Mastermind had its world premiere at the main competition of the 2025 Cannes Film Festival on May 23, 2025, where it was nominated for the Palme d'Or.

== Collaborators ==
Reichardt has frequently collaborated with the actress Michelle Williams, saying that she enjoys Williams's confidence and inquisitive nature, and that she can never guess what she will do. Williams has starred in four of Reichardt's films.

Jonathan Raymond has written or co-written the screenplays of six of Reichardt's films. Old Joy and Wendy and Lucy were both co-written with Reichardt, and are based on his short stories. First Cow is based on Raymond's novel, titled The Half Life. He is based in Oregon, where a large number of Reichardt's films are set and shot.

Reichardt has frequently collaborated with American cinematographer Christopher Blauvelt. He has been the director of photography for five of her feature films, starting with Night Moves in 2013. In an interview with Filmmaker Magazine, Reichardt said, "it’s the closest DP relationship I’ve ever had. He’s so invested in getting you what you want. He does not have a separate agenda for himself. That’s a really hard thing to find, I’ve found."

Reichardt's dog Lucy appeared in two of her films, Old Joy and Wendy and Lucy. Her film Certain Women was dedicated to Lucy’s memory.

== Style and themes ==
=== Minimalism ===
Reichardt's films have often been called minimalist and realist, with film critic A. O. Scott describing Wendy and Lucy as part of a new American Independent cinema he termed "Neo-Neo Realism", primarily due to its thematic and aesthetic similarity to classic Italian neorealist films such as Rome Open City and Paisan. Reichardt sees a difference between her work and the minimalist movement as a whole, and has called her films "just glimpses of people passing through". She also recognizes her style as minimalist, saying, "A movie is a series of reveals, essentially, and then you're supposed to sit in a room and tell someone what it all means. That goes against everything that I just worked for, so I have no interest in summing it all up. It's all out there". Her films' realist tendencies position them in line with Matthew Flanagan's idea of slow cinema. Their long takes, minimal dialogue and minimalist action are all characteristics of slow cinema that allow the audience time for contemplation. This style may also be in response to more mainstream films; Reichardt has said, "when I go to the movies and I sit through the previews, I literally feel assaulted." As a mode of minimalist art film, Reichardt uses slow cinema and control of time as a means of storytelling and a conveyer of feeling. This style is exemplified in Reichardt's filmography through a deliberately unhurried pacing of narrative events, which allows for a deeper exploration and emphasis on atmosphere and character psychology. In her work, this style is frequently paired with naturalistic performances from actors and minimalist sound design, allowing for viewers to have their attention drawn to the physical and emotional landscapes that Reichardt creates.

Reichardt also diverges from the mainstream with her films' avant-garde content. River of Grass segments the narrative into numbered sections, and Certain Women is also divided into episodes. Reichardt's realism and camera angles reject the objectification of bodies and challenge audience expectations by lingering on seemingly insignificant images after characters have left a scene.

=== Marginal characters ===
Reichardt's films often focus on characters on the margins of society, who are not usually represented on screen, or who are seeking a better quality of life and place in the world. She is interested in characters "who don't have a net, who if you sneezed on them, their world would fall apart". Her films tackle aspects of the American experience the commercial film industry seldom explores. Eric Kohn of Indiewire has called her films "a mesmerizing statement on the solitude of everyday life for working-class people who want something better. They're trapped between a mythology of greatness and the personal limitations that govern their drab realities. By attending to atmosphere and attitude as much as plot, Reichardt has quietly become one of the country's best chroniclers of the American experience". In his contemporary review of Old Joy, Slant Magazine's Nick Schager praises how "Reichardt’s delicate touch is such that it creates room for an interpretative flexibility. The film’s pauses in dialogue and the unseen spaces between scenes breathe with palpable, mysterious life."

=== Politics and allegory ===
Reichardt's films often contain references to modern times and political events. Of Meek's Cutoff, she said, "Here was the story of this braggart leading a bunch of people into the desert without a plan and becoming completely reliant on the locals who are socially different from him and who he is suspicious of. All of which seemed relevant to the moment" (in reference to the Iraq War and George W. Bush). Reichardt has confirmed that the character Meek was meant to resemble Bush. Alongside this, Meek's Cutoff highlights themes of Indigenous lives and decolonization, aspects often ignored within the Western genre. The film reflects the disillusionment of American expansion to the west, and Reichardt uses visual imagery, such as women's clothing to depict the racist segregation and conflict of white colonizers and indigenous characters.

Wendy and Lucy also reflects the economic hardships that affected millions of Americans (particularly women, whom the film suggests are affected more than men) as a result of the high costs and collateral damage from the war. Reichardt's 2013 film Night Moves has more overt political references. The three protagonists are radical environmentalists, and the film is set in Oregon, a state with many notable instances of environmental protest, particularly against its lumber industry and in defense of the Northern Spotted Owl, an indicator species of the Pacific Northwest.

=== Ambiguity ===
Critics have noted that Reichardt's films often have ambiguous endings that leave the audience hanging and unsatisfied. Xan Brooks of The Guardian uses the examples of "wonky Kurt, left wandering city streets at the end of Old Joy, hapless Wendy, still looking for Alaska, or Meek's Cutoff's lost pioneers, forever strung between triumph and disaster. These films do not so much resolve as dissolve. They leave us dangling, forced to write their third acts in our heads". Reichardt has said, "Maybe I'm suspicious of absolutes. I mean, yes, there is something satisfying about watching an old film when the music rises up and the words come at you: The End. But it would seem absurd to do that at the end of one of my films. It would just make them feel lopsided, because they're all so short, they cover so little time. We don't know where these people were before. We spent a week with them and then on they went". She has also said that she enjoys films that let the audience find their own way in and come to their own conclusions.

=== Feminism ===
Reichardt's films contain feminist ideas in both style and content, rejecting mainstream, male-centric, commercial filmmaking methods and focusing on gender. Patricia White, a film and media expert at Swarthmore College, writes that, while Reichardt makes "feminist films," she and France's Claire Denis are examples of filmmakers who view the term "woman director" as reductive or redundant and, in doing so, deconstruct "the discourse of exceptionalism that attends auteurism." She rejects mainstream methods by using small budgets, filming on location (most of her films are shot in Oregon), and refusing to romanticize her characters and their struggles. Feminist themes are often present in Reichardt's work, and are a notable aspect of her filmic style. Much of her films are female-led. Meek's Cutoff centers on the women of a wagon train in the Oregon wilderness, and depicts an often unseen feminist side of classic Western cinema. A similar feminist style is seen in Certain Women, depicting the lives of ordinary women not usual shown in popular media through a filmic lens. Reichardt's work portrays female protagonists grappling with issues of isolation and solitude, economic hardships, and the social constraints of gendered roles, for example. She places an emphasis the lived experiences of women, highlighting personal journeys, often alone and away from the narrative influence of male protagonists. While not being a filmmaker explicitly focused on political or activist narratives, Reichardt's work often engages with broader feminist concerns.

In Old Joy, which stars two men and was spoken about at festivals as an LGBTQ+ film, the theme of male friendship is highlighted and addressed through feminized qualities of sensitivity and vulnerability rarely seen in mainstream Hollywood cinema. In Night Moves, Dakota Fanning's character serves as a strong female counterpoint to Jesse Eisenberg's male protagonist, and the film's environmental storyline reflects eco-feminist values.

== Filmography ==
Film

Year	Title	Director	Writer	Editor	Notes
1994	River of Grass	Yes	Yes	No	
2006	Old Joy	Yes	Yes	Yes	
2008	Wendy and Lucy	Yes	Yes	Yes	
2010	Meek's Cutoff	Yes	No	Yes	
2013	Night Moves	Yes	Yes	Yes	
2016	Certain Women	Yes	Yes	Yes	
2019	First Cow	Yes	Yes	Yes	
2022	Showing Up	Yes	Yes	Yes	
2025	The Mastermind	Yes	Yes	Yes	

Short film

Year	Title	Director	Writer	DoP	Ref.
1999	Ode	Yes	Yes	Yes	
2001	Then a Year	Yes	No	No	
2004	Travis	Yes	No	No	
2019	Owl	Yes	No	No	
2021	Bronx, New York, November 2019	Yes	No	Yes	
2021	Cal State Long Beach, CA, January 2020	Yes	No	Yes	

== Accolades ==
Year	Institution	Category	Nominated work	Result	Ref.
1994	Sundance Film Festival	Grand Jury Prize: Dramatic	River of Grass	Nominated	
1996	Independent Spirit Awards	Best First Feature	River of Grass	Nominated	
1996	Independent Spirit Awards	Best First Screenplay	River of Grass	Nominated	
1996	Independent Spirit Awards	Someone to Watch Award	River of Grass	Nominated	
2006	Gotham Independent Film Awards	Best Feature	Old Joy	Nominated	
2006	Los Angeles Film Critics Association Awards	The Douglas Edwards Experimental/Independent Film/Video Award	Old Joy	Won	
2007	Independent Spirit Awards	John Cassavetes Award	Old Joy	Nominated	
2008	Alliance of Women Film Journalists	Best Woman Director	Wendy and Lucy	Nominated	
2008	Alliance of Women Film Journalists	Best Woman Screenwriter	Wendy and Lucy	Nominated	
2008	Cannes Film Festival	Un Certain Regard	Wendy and Lucy	Nominated	
2008	Chicago International Film Festival	Gold Hugo (Best Feature)	Wendy and Lucy	Nominated	
2010	Venice International Film Festival	Golden Lion	Meek's Cutoff	Nominated	
2010	Venice International Film Festival	SIGNIS Award	Meek's Cutoff	Won	
2011	Alliance of Women Film Journalists	Best Woman Director	Meek's Cutoff	Nominated	
2011	Gotham Independent Film Awards	Best Feature	Meek's Cutoff	Nominated	
2013	Venice International Film Festival	Golden Lion	Night Moves	Nominated	
2016	Alliance of Women Film Journalists	Best Woman Director	Certain Women	Nominated	
2016	Alliance of Women Film Journalists	Best Woman Screenwriter	Certain Women	Won	
2016	Gotham Independent Film Awards	Best Feature	Certain Women	Nominated	
2016	Gotham Independent Film Awards	Audience Award	Certain Women	Nominated	
2016	London Film Festival	Best Film	Certain Women	Won	
2017	Independent Spirit Awards	Best Director	Certain Women	Nominated	
2020	Alliance of Women Film Journalists	Best Director	First Cow	Nominated	
2020	Alliance of Women Film Journalists	Best Writing, Adapted Screenplay	First Cow	Nominated	
2020	Alliance of Women Film Journalists	Best Woman Director	First Cow	Nominated	
2020	Austin Film Critics Association Awards	Best Director	First Cow	Nominated	
2020	Berlin International Film Festival	Golden Bear	First Cow	Nominated	
2020	Critics' Choice Awards	Best Adapted Screenplay	First Cow	Nominated	
2020	Chicago Film Critics Association Awards	Best Director	First Cow	Nominated	
2020	Chicago Film Critics Association Awards	Best Adapted Screenplay	First Cow	Nominated	
2020	Gotham Independent Film Awards	Best Feature	First Cow	Nominated	
2020	Gotham Independent Film Awards	Best Screenplay	First Cow	Nominated	
2020	Independent Spirit Awards	The Bonnie Award	Herself	Won	
2020	USC Scripter Award		First Cow	Nominated	
2021	Independent Spirit Awards	Best Director	First Cow	Nominated	
2021	British Independent Film Awards	Best International Independent Film	First Cow	Nominated	
2021	International Film Festival Rotterdam	Robby Müller Award	Herself	Won	
2022	47th César Awards	Best Foreign Film	First Cow	Nominated	
2022	2022 Cannes Film Festival	Palme d'Or	Showing Up	Nominated	
2022	2022 Cannes Film Festival	Carrosse d'Or	—N/a	Honored	
2022	75th Locarno Film Festival	Pardo d'onore Manor	Herself	Honored	
2023	39th Independent Spirit Awards	Robert Altman Award	Showing Up	Won	

== Awards and nominations ==
Reichardt is a multiple award-winning director. Her first feature film, River of Grass, was nominated for several awards at both the Sundance Film Festival in 1994 and the Independent Spirit Awards in 1996. She won her first award for her second feature, Old Joy, at the Los Angeles Film Critics Association Awards, in 2006. At the 2016 edition of the London Film Festival, Certain Women was awarded best film. Her most widely acclaimed film is First Cow; first screened in 2019, it ultimately received fourteen nominations from ten different award bodies. Her 2022 feature film Showing Up won the Robert Altman Award at the 39th Independent Spirit Awards.

== Bibliography ==
- James Lattimer, Eva Sangiorgi, ed., Textur #2: Kelly Reichardt. Viennale – Vienna International Film Festival 2020, ISBN 978-3-901770-49 4.
- Seymour, Nicole; Fusco, Katherine (2017). Kelly Reichardt (Contemporary Film Directors). University of Illinois Press. ISBN 978-0252083051.

== See also ==
- Social realism
- Minimalist film

== Sources ==
- Hall, E. Dawn (2018). ReFocus: The Films of Kelly Reichardt. Edinburgh, Scotland: Edinburgh University Press. doi:10.3366/edinburgh/9781474411127.001.0001. ISBN 978-1-474-41113-4.
