= Old Joy =

2006 American film by Kelly Reichardt

- Directed by: Kelly Reichardt
- Screenplay by: Kelly Reichardt
- Based on: "Old Joy" by Jonathan Raymond
- Produced by: Lars Knudsen; Neil Kopp; Anish Savjani; Jay Van Hoy
- Starring: Will Oldham; Daniel London
- Cinematography: Peter Sillen
- Edited by: Kelly Reichardt
- Music by: Yo La Tengo
- Production companies: Film Science; Van Hoy/Knudsen Productions; Washington Square Films
- Distributed by: Kino International
- Release dates: January 2006 (Sundance); August 25, 2006 (United States)
- Running time: 76 minutes
- Country: United States
- Language: English
- Budget: $30,000
- Box office: $399,908

Old Joy is a 2006 American road movie written and directed by Kelly Reichardt and based on a short story by Jonathan Raymond. The original soundtrack for the film is by Yo La Tengo and included on the compilation soundtrack album They Shoot, We Score.

The film received critical acclaim according to Metacritic and was a box-office success.

== Plot ==
Mark is a former hippie who has settled down in Portland, Oregon, and is expecting a child with his wife Tania. His old friend Kurt, who has not seen Mark in some years, calls Mark to invite him on an overnight camping trip to Bagby Hot Springs in the Cascades. Unlike Mark, Kurt still lives a hand-to-mouth hippie lifestyle, crashing on couches and spending much of his time at meditation retreats. When Mark accepts Kurt’s invitation, Tania reacts passive-aggressively. Mark invites Tania, but she declines.

Mark and his dog Lucy arrive where Kurt is staying and wait for him for some time before he arrives. Kurt has just returned from a “transformative” retreat in Ashland. Mark agrees to drive them to Bagby, and they depart along with Lucy. The two lament the closing of their favorite second-hand store, which they describe as the “end of an era.”

They get lost and pitch a tent at a campsite strewn with abandoned furniture. Kurt explains his theory of a teardrop-shaped universe to an indifferent Mark, then breaks down, lamenting that something has “come between” the two friends and that he wants them to be real friends again. Mark disagrees with this assessment but remains apprehensive. After some time drinking beer and shooting the cans with a pellet gun, the two men sleep together in the tent.

In the morning, the two stop at a diner and receive directions to Bagby from a waitress. They arrive, and Kurt describes a dream he had in which a kind old woman reassured him that “sorrow is nothing but worn-out joy.” Despite Mark’s earlier assertion to Tania that the two would return to Portland around noon, the two do not get into town until well after dark.

The two men say a quick goodbye and part on the same street where they met up. Mark turns on Air America and sits in the car in contemplation. The final shots show Kurt wandering the streets of Portland, apparently with nowhere to go.

== Reception ==
The film was a commercial success, earning nearly $400,000 on a $30,000 budget. It later gained an additional $63,920 in profit from Domestic Home Video sales.

Rotten Tomatoes reported that 85% of 94 critics gave the film positive reviews, with an average rating of 7.3/10. The site's critics consensus reads: "A serene, melancholy beauty permeates this meditative film." Metacritic reported the film had an average score of 84 out of 100, based on 24 critics, indicating "universal acclaim". The New York Times called it "one of the finest American films of the year".

The film appeared on several critics' top ten lists of the best films of 2006.

- 2nd – Ella Taylor, LA Weekly
- 4th – Marc Mohan, The Oregonian
- 4th – Scott Tobias, The A.V. Club
- 4th – Ty Burr, The Boston Globe
- 8th – Lisa Schwarzbaum, Entertainment Weekly
- 10th – Wesley Morris, The Boston Globe

The film also won awards from the Los Angeles Film Critics Association, the Rotterdam International Film Festival, and the Sarasota Film Festival. Neil Kopp won the Producer's Award at the Independent Spirit Awards for his work on Old Joy and Paranoid Park.

== Soundtrack ==
An EP of Yo La Tengo's soundtrack, featuring session guitarist Smokey Hormel, was released by Mississippi Records in 2025. It expands on, and is slightly different, than what is included on the original compilation They Shoot, We Score.
