= Michelle Williams on screen and stage =

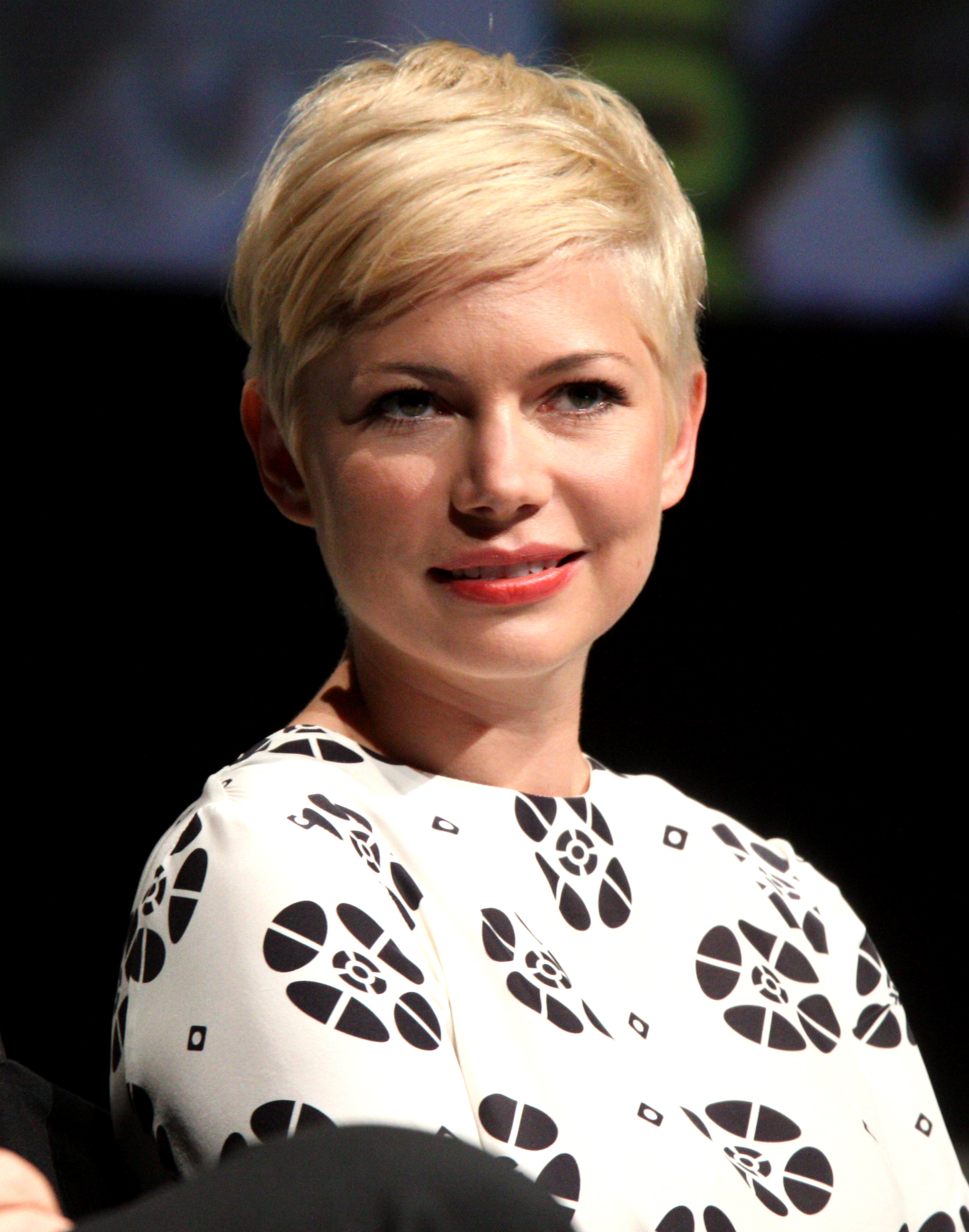
Williams at the 2012 San Diego Comic-Con

American actress Michelle Williams' first screen appearance was at age thirteen in a 1993 episode of the television series Baywatch, and she made her film debut as the love interest of a teenage boy in Lassie (1994). She had guest roles in the sitcoms Step by Step and Home Improvement, and played the younger version of Natasha Henstridge's character in the science fiction film Species (1995). Greater success came to Williams for playing the sexually troubled teenager Jen Lindley in the teen drama series Dawson's Creek (1998–2003). In 1999, she made her stage debut with the Tracy Letts-written play Killer Joe.

In the 2000s, Williams eschewed parts in big-budget films in favor of roles with darker themes in independent productions such as Me Without You (2001) and The Station Agent (2003). Despite positive reviews, these films were not widely seen. This changed in 2005 when Williams played the neglected wife of Heath Ledger's character in Brokeback Mountain, a drama about star-crossed gay lovers, which became a critical and commercial success; Williams gained a nomination for the Academy Award for Best Supporting Actress. Her career did not progress much in the next few years, but Kelly Reichardt's Wendy and Lucy (2008), in which she starred as a drifter searching for her missing dog, was critically acclaimed. Martin Scorsese's thriller Shutter Island (2010), starring Leonardo DiCaprio, in which Williams had a supporting part, became her most widely seen film to that point.

Williams received two consecutive Oscar nominations for Best Actress for starring as an unhappily married woman in Blue Valentine (2010) and Marilyn Monroe in My Week with Marilyn (2011); she also won a Golden Globe Award for the latter. She next played Glinda in the commercially successful fantasy feature Oz the Great and Powerful (2013). On Broadway, she played Sally Bowles in a revival of the musical Cabaret in 2014, and a sexual abuse survivor in a revival of the play Blackbird in 2016. For the latter, she gained a Tony Award for Best Actress nomination. She earned another Academy Award nomination for playing a grieving mother in Manchester by the Sea (2016). The 2017 musical The Greatest Showman and the 2018 superhero film Venom emerged as two of her highest-grossing releases. She returned to television in 2019 to portray Gwen Verdon opposite Sam Rockwell's Bob Fosse in the FX miniseries Fosse/Verdon, winning a Primetime Emmy Award for Best Actress. Williams received her fifth Oscar nomination for starring as a troubled mother in Steven Spielberg's semi-autobiographical drama The Fabelmans (2022).

== Film ==
Key
†	Denotes films that have not yet been released

Year	Title	Role	Notes	Ref.
1994	Lassie	April Porter		
1995	Timemaster	Annie		
1995	Species	Young Sil		
1997	A Thousand Acres	Pammy		
1998	Halloween H20: 20 Years Later	Molly Cartwell		
1999	Dick	Arlene Lorenzo		
1999	But I'm a Cheerleader	Kimberly		
2001	Perfume	Halley Crawford		
2001	Me Without You	Holly Rossman		
2001	Prozac Nation	Ruby		
2003	The United States of Leland	Julie Pollard		
2003	The Station Agent	Emily		
2004	Land of Plenty	Lana		
2004	Imaginary Heroes	Penny Travis		
2004	A Hole in One	Anna Watson		
2005	The Baxter	Cecil Mills		
2005	Brokeback Mountain	Alma Beers del Mar		
2006	The Hawk Is Dying	Betty		
2006	The Hottest State	Samantha / Sam		
2007	I'm Not There	Coco Rivington		
2008	Deception	S		
2008	Incendiary	Young mother		
2008	Synecdoche, New York	Claire Elizabeth Keen		
2008	Wendy and Lucy	Wendy Carroll		
2009	Mammoth	Ellen Vidales		
2010	Blue Valentine	Cynthia "Cindy" Heller Pereira	Also executive producer	
2010	Shutter Island	Dolores Chanal		
2010	Meek's Cutoff	Emily Tetherow		
2011	My Week with Marilyn	Marilyn Monroe		
2011	Take This Waltz	Margot		
2012	Ben Lee: Catch My Disease	Herself	Documentary film	
2013	Oz the Great and Powerful	Annie Gale / Glinda (Note: She played a dual role in the film.)		
2015	Suite Française	Lucille Angellier		
2016	Manchester by the Sea	Randi Ellington		
2016	Certain Women	Gina Lewis		
2016	Project X	Herself	Voice; Short film	
2017	Wonderstruck	Elaine Wilson		
2017	The Greatest Showman	Charity Barnum		
2017	All the Money in the World	Abigail "Gail" Harris		
2018	I Feel Pretty	Avery LeClaire		
2018	Venom	Anne Weying		
2019	After the Wedding	Isabel Andersen		
2020	That Click	Herself	Documentary film	
2021	Venom: Let There Be Carnage	Anne Weying		
2022	Showing Up	Lizzie Carr		
2022	The Fabelmans	Mitzi Fabelman		
2023	Deep Sky	Narrator	Documentary film	
2027	A Place in Hell		Post-production	
TBA	Untitled Damien Chazelle film		Filming	

== Television ==
Year	Title	Role	Notes	Ref.
1993	Baywatch	Bridget	Episode: "Race Against Time: Part 1"	
1994	Step by Step	J.J.	Episode: "Something Wild"	
1995	Home Improvement	Jessica Lutz	Episode: "Wilson's Girlfriend"	
1995	Raising Caines	Trish Caines	Main role; season 1	
1996	My Son Is Innocent	Donna Winston	Television film	
1997	Killing Mr. Griffin	Maya	Television film	
1998–2003	Dawson's Creek	Jen Lindley	Main role; 6 seasons	
2000	If These Walls Could Talk 2	Linda	Television film	
2013	Cougar Town	Laurie's foster sister	Episode: "Blue Sunday"	
2019	Fosse/Verdon	Gwen Verdon	Miniseries; lead role and executive producer	
2025	Dying for Sex	Molly Kochan	Miniseries; lead role and executive producer	

== Theater ==
Year	Title	Role	Venue	Ref.
1999	Killer Joe	Dottie	SoHo Playhouse	
2002	Smelling a Rat	Melanie-Jane	Samuel Beckett Theatre	
2004	The Cherry Orchard	Varya	Williamstown Theatre Festival	
2014	Cabaret	Sally Bowles	Studio 54	
2016	Blackbird	Una Spencer	Belasco Theatre	
2025	Anna Christie	Anna Christie	St. Ann's Warehouse	

== Audiobook ==
Year	Title	Role	Ref.
2023	The Woman in Me	Narrator	

== Music video ==
Year	Title	Performer(s)	Album	Ref.
2012	"Paradise"	Wild Nothing	Nocturne	

== Discography ==
Soundtrack	Year	Song	Label	Ref.
My Week with Marilyn	2011	"When Love Goes Wrong, Nothin' Goes Right / Heat Wave"	Sony Music	
My Week with Marilyn	2011	"It's a Wrap, I Found a Dream"	Sony Music	
My Week with Marilyn	2011	"That Old Black Magic"	Sony Music	
The Greatest Showman	2017	"A Million Dreams"	Atlantic Records	
The Greatest Showman	2017	"Tightrope"	Atlantic Records	
Fosse/Verdon	2019	"Razzle Dazzle"	Atlantic Records	

== See also ==
- List of awards and nominations received by Michelle Williams (actress)
