= List of awards and nominations received by Michelle Williams (actress) =

Michelle Williams awards and nominations
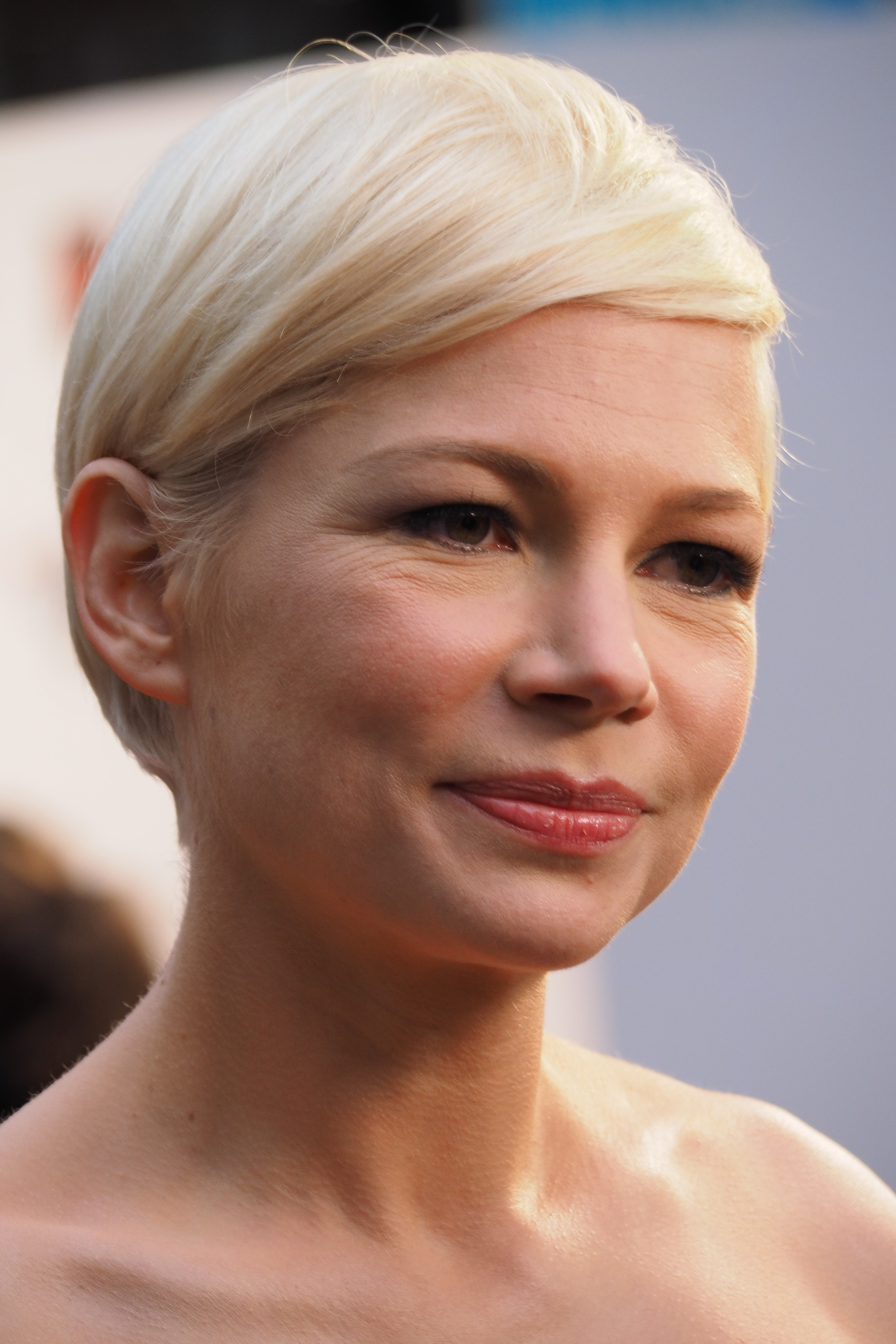
- Williams at the UK premiere of Manchester by the Sea (2016)
Awards and nominations
Award	Wins	Nominations
Academy Awards	0	5
Actor Awards	2	9
BAFTA Awards	0	4
Critics' Choice	2	8
Emmy Awards	1	4
Golden Globes	3	7
Tony Awards	0	1

Totals (Note: Certain award groups do not simply award one winner. They acknowledge several different recipients, have runners-up, and have third place. Since this is a specific recognition and is different from losing an award, runner-up mentions are considered wins in this award tally. For simplification and to avoid errors, each award in this list has been presumed to have had a prior nomination.)
- Wins: 53
- Nominations: 161

Michelle Williams is an American actress. She has received various accolades including three Golden Globe Awards, a Primetime Emmy Award and two Critics' Choice Awards as well as nominations for five Academy Awards, four BAFTA Awards, and a Tony Award.

For her roles on film, she has received five Academy Award nominations, three for Best Actress for playing a woman in an emotional romantic relationship in the drama Blue Valentine (2010), Marilyn Monroe in the comedy-drama My Week with Marilyn (2011), and emotionally unwell mother in semi-biographical drama The Fabelmans (2022) and two for Best Supporting Actress for playing a woman married to a gay man in the western romantic drama Brokeback Mountain (2005) and an emotional ex-wife in the drama Manchester by the Sea (2016).

For television, she earned the Primetime Emmy Award for Outstanding Lead Actress in a Limited or Anthology Series or Movie, the Golden Globe Award for Best Actress – Miniseries or Television Film, and the Actor Award for Outstanding Performance by a Female Actor in a Miniseries or Television Movie for playing Gwen Verdon in the FX on Hulu biographical limited series Fosse/Verdon (2019). She returned to television for the miniseries Dying for Sex (2025), for which she once again received the Golden Globe Award for Best Actress – Miniseries or Television Film and the Actor Award for Outstanding Performance by a Female Actor in a Miniseries or Television Movie, as well as another nomination for the Primetime Emmy Award for Outstanding Lead Actress in a Limited or Anthology Series or Movie.

On stage, she starred as a woman confronting her abuser in the Broadway revival of David Harrower's Blackbird (2016) for which she was nominated for the Tony Award for Best Actress in a Play.

== Major associations ==
=== Academy Awards ===
Year	Category	Nominated work	Result	Ref.
2006	Best Supporting Actress	Brokeback Mountain	Nominated	
2011	Best Actress	Blue Valentine	Nominated	
2012	Best Actress	My Week with Marilyn	Nominated	
2017	Best Supporting Actress	Manchester by the Sea	Nominated	
2023	Best Actress	The Fabelmans	Nominated	

=== Actor Awards ===
Year	Category	Nominated work	Result	Ref.
2003	Outstanding Cast in a Motion Picture	The Station Agent	Nominated	
2005	Outstanding Cast in a Motion Picture	Brokeback Mountain	Nominated	
2005	Outstanding Female Actor in a Supporting Role	Brokeback Mountain	Nominated	
2011	Outstanding Female Actor in a Leading Role	My Week with Marilyn	Nominated	
2016	Outstanding Female Actor in a Supporting Role	Manchester by the Sea	Nominated	
2016	Outstanding Cast in a Motion Picture	Manchester by the Sea	Nominated	
2019	Outstanding Female Actor in a Miniseries or Television Movie	Fosse/Verdon	Won	
2022	Outstanding Cast in a Motion Picture	The Fabelmans	Nominated	
2025	Outstanding Female Actor in a Miniseries or Television Movie	Dying for Sex	Won	

=== BAFTA Awards ===
Year	Category	Nominated work	Result	Ref.
British Academy Film Awards
2005	Rising Star Award		Nominated	
2005	Best Actress in a Supporting Role	Brokeback Mountain	Nominated	
2011	Best Actress in a Leading Role	My Week with Marilyn	Nominated	
2016	Best Actress in a Supporting Role	Manchester by the Sea	Nominated	

=== Critics' Choice Awards ===
Year	Category	Nominated work	Result	Ref.
Critics' Choice Movie Awards
2005	Best Supporting Actress	Brokeback Mountain	Won (Note: Tied with Amy Adams for Junebug.)	
2010	Best Actress	Blue Valentine	Nominated	
2011	Best Actress	My Week with Marilyn	Nominated	
2016	Best Supporting Actress	Manchester by the Sea	Nominated	
2016	Best Acting Ensemble	Manchester by the Sea	Nominated	
2022	Best Acting Ensemble	The Fabelmans	Nominated	
2022	Best Actress	The Fabelmans	Nominated	
Critics' Choice Television Awards
2019	Best Actress in a Limited Series or Television Movie	Fosse/Verdon	Won	
2025	Best Actress in a Limited Series or Television Movie	Dying for Sex	Nominated	

=== Emmy Awards ===
Year	Category	Nominated work	Result	Ref.
Primetime Emmy Awards
2019	Outstanding Limited Series	Fosse/Verdon	Nominated	
2019	Outstanding Lead Actress in a Limited Series or Movie	Fosse/Verdon	Won	
2025	Outstanding Limited Series	Dying for Sex	Nominated	
2025	Outstanding Lead Actress in a Limited Series or Movie	Dying for Sex	Nominated	

=== Golden Globe Awards ===
Year	Category	Nominated work	Result	Ref.
2006	Best Supporting Actress – Motion Picture	Brokeback Mountain	Nominated	
2011	Best Actress in a Motion Picture – Drama	Blue Valentine	Nominated	
2012	Best Actress in a Motion Picture – Musical or Comedy	My Week with Marilyn	Won	
2017	Best Supporting Actress – Motion Picture	Manchester by the Sea	Nominated	
2018	Best Actress in a Motion Picture – Drama	All the Money in the World	Nominated	
2020	Best Actress – Miniseries or Television Film	Fosse/Verdon	Won	
2023	Best Actress in a Motion Picture – Drama	The Fabelmans	Nominated	
2026	Best Actress – Miniseries or Television Film	Dying for Sex	Won	

=== Tony Awards ===
Year	Category	Nominated work	Result	Ref.
2016	Best Actress in a Play	Blackbird	Nominated	

== Other awards and nominations ==
Organization	Year	Category	Nominated work	Result	Ref.
Australian Academy of Cinema and Television Arts	2012	Best Actress	My Week with Marilyn	Nominated	
Australian Academy of Cinema and Television Arts	2017	Best Supporting Actress	Manchester by the Sea	Nominated	
Australian Academy of Cinema and Television Arts	2023	Best Actress	The Fabelmans	Nominated	
Audie Awards	2024	Best Non-Fiction Narrator	The Woman in Me	Nominated	
Canadian Screen Award	2012	Best Actress	Take This Waltz	Nominated	
Gotham Awards	2005	Best Ensemble Cast	Brokeback Mountain	Nominated	
Gotham Awards	2008	Best Ensemble Cast	Synecdoche, New York	Won	
Gotham Awards	2022	Performer Tribute	The Fabelmans	Won	
Gotham Awards	2023	Outstanding Lead Performance	Showing Up	Nominated	
Gotham TV Awards	2005	Outstanding Lead Performance in a Limited Series	Dying for Sex	Nominated	
Hollywood Film Awards	2011	Hollywood Actress Award	My Week with Marilyn	Won	
Independent Spirit Awards	2005	Best Female Lead	Land of Plenty	Nominated	
Independent Spirit Awards	2006	Best Supporting Female	Brokeback Mountain	Nominated	
Independent Spirit Awards	2009	Best Female Lead	Wendy and Lucy	Nominated	
Independent Spirit Awards	2011	Best Female Lead	Blue Valentine	Nominated	
Independent Spirit Awards	2012	Best Female Lead	My Week with Marilyn	Won	
Independent Spirit Awards	2026	Best Lead Performance in a New Scripted Series	Dying for Sex	Nominated	
MTV Movie & TV Awards	2012	Best On-Screen Transformation	My Week with Marilyn	Nominated	
Satellite Awards	2010	Best Actress in a Motion Picture – Drama	Blue Valentine	Nominated	
Satellite Awards	2011	Best Actress in a Motion Picture – Drama	My Week with Marilyn	Nominated	
Satellite Awards	2017	Best Supporting Actress – Motion Picture	Manchester by the Sea	Nominated	
Satellite Awards	2020	Best Actress – Miniseries or Television Film	Fosse/Verdon	Won	
Satellite Awards	2023	Best Actress in a Motion Picture – Drama	The Fabelmans	Nominated	
TCA Awards	2019	Individual Achievement in Drama	Fosse/Verdon	Won	
TCA Awards	2025	Individual Achievement in Comedy	Dying for Sex	Nominated	
Teen Choice Awards	2010	Choice Movie Actress – Horror/Thriller	Shutter Island	Nominated	
Teen Choice Awards	2013	Choice Movie Actress – Sci-Fi/Fantasy	Oz the Great and Powerful	Nominated	
Young Artist Award	1995	Best Young Actress Co-Starring in a Motion Picture	Lassie	Nominated	
Young Artist Award	1999	Best Supporting Young Actress in a Feature Film	Halloween H20: 20 Years Later	Nominated	
Young Artist Award	2000	Best Leading Young Actress in a Feature Film	Dick	Nominated	

== Critics associations and other awards ==
Year	Organization	Category	Nominated work	Result	Ref.
2000	Lucy Awards	Excellence in a Motion Picture Made for Television	If These Walls Could Talk 2	Won	
2005	Phoenix Film Critics Society	Best Supporting Actress	Brokeback Mountain	Won	
2005	Awards Circuit Community	Best Cast Ensemble	Brokeback Mountain	Runner-up	
2005	Village Voice Film Poll	Best Supporting Actress	Brokeback Mountain	6th place	
2005	Awards Circuit Community	Best Actress in a Supporting Role	Brokeback Mountain	Nominated	
2005	Central Ohio Film Critics Association	Best Ensemble	Brokeback Mountain	Nominated	
2005	Chicago Film Critics Association	Best Supporting Actress	Brokeback Mountain	Nominated	
2005	Dallas–Fort Worth Film Critics Association	Best Supporting Actress	Brokeback Mountain	Nominated	
2005	Golden Schmoes Award	Best Supporting Actress	Brokeback Mountain	Nominated	
2005	International Online Cinema Awards	Best Supporting Actress	Brokeback Mountain	Nominated	
2005	Italian Online Movie Awards	Best Supporting Actress	Brokeback Mountain	Nominated	
2005	Online Film Critics Society	Best Supporting Actress	Brokeback Mountain	Nominated	
2005	Southeastern Film Critics Association	Best Supporting Actress	Brokeback Mountain	Nominated	
2005	St. Louis Gateway Film Critics Association	Best Supporting Actress	Brokeback Mountain	Nominated	
2005	Vancouver Film Critics Circle	Best Supporting Actress	Brokeback Mountain	Nominated	
2005	Washington D.C. Area Film Critics Association	Best Supporting Actress	Brokeback Mountain	Nominated	
2008	Online Film Critics Society	Best Actress	Wendy and Lucy	Won	
2008	Toronto Film Critics Association	Best Actress	Wendy and Lucy	Won	
2008	Village Voice Film Poll	Best Actress	Wendy and Lucy	Runner-up	
2008	Alliance of Women Film Journalists	Best Actress	Wendy and Lucy	Nominated	
2008	Chlotrudis Award	Best Actress	Wendy and Lucy	Nominated	
2008	IndieWire Critics Poll	Best Actress	Wendy and Lucy	Nominated	
2008	National Society of Film Critics	Best Actress	Wendy and Lucy	Nominated	
2008	International Cinephile Society	Best Actress	Wendy and Lucy	Nominated	
2010	San Francisco Film Critics Circle	Best Actress	Blue Valentine	Won	
2010	Dublin Film Critics' Circle	Best Actress	Blue Valentine	4th place	
2010	Village Voice Film Poll	Best Actress	Blue Valentine	10th place	
2010	Alliance of Women Film Journalists	Best Actress	Blue Valentine	Nominated	
2010	Awards Circuit Community	Best Actress	Blue Valentine	Nominated	
2010	Chicago Film Critics Association	Best Actress	Blue Valentine	Nominated	
2010	Dallas–Fort Worth Film Critics Association	Best Actress	Blue Valentine	Nominated	
2010	Denver Film Critics Society	Best Actress	Blue Valentine	Nominated	
2010	Detroit Film Critics Society	Best Actress	Blue Valentine	Nominated	
2010	Golden Schmoes Award	Best Actress	Blue Valentine	Nominated	
2010	International Cinephile Society	Best Actress	Blue Valentine	Nominated	
2010	International Online Cinema Award	Best Actress	Blue Valentine	Nominated	
2010	Rembrandt Award	Best International Actress	Blue Valentine	Nominated	
2010	San Diego Film Critics Society	Best Actress	Blue Valentine	Nominated	
2010	Toronto Film Critics Association	Best Actress	Blue Valentine	Nominated	
2010	Utah Film Critics Association	Best Actress	Blue Valentine	Nominated	
2011	Boston Society of Film Critics	Best Actress	My Week with Marilyn	Won	
2011	Capri Hollywood International Film Festival Awards	Ensemble Cast Award	My Week with Marilyn	Won	
2011	Chicago Film Critics Association	Best Actress	My Week with Marilyn	Won	
2011	Dallas–Fort Worth Film Critics Association	Best Actress	My Week with Marilyn	Won	
2011	Detroit Film Critics Society	Best Actress	My Week with Marilyn	Won	
2011	Florida Film Critics Circle	Best Actress	My Week with Marilyn	Won	
2011	Las Vegas Film Critics Society	Best Actress	My Week with Marilyn	Won	
2011	Oklahoma Film Critics Circle	Best Actress	My Week with Marilyn	Won	
2011	Palm Springs International Film Festival	Desert Palm Achievement Award	My Week with Marilyn	Won	
2011	Toronto Film Critics Association	Best Actress	My Week with Marilyn	Won	
2011	Washington D.C. Area Film Critics Association	Best Actress	My Week with Marilyn	Won	
2011	New York Film Critics Circle	Best Actress	My Week with Marilyn	Runner-up	
2011	St. Louis Gateway Film Critics Association	Best Actress	My Week with Marilyn	Runner-up	
2011	Alliance of Women Film Journalists	Best Actress	My Week with Marilyn	Nominated	
2011	Awards Circuit Community Awards	Best Actress	My Week with Marilyn	Nominated	
2011	Central Ohio Film Critics Association	Best Actress	My Week with Marilyn	Nominated	
2011	Críticos de Cinema Online Portugueses Awards	Best Actress	My Week with Marilyn	Nominated	
2011	Empire Award	Best Actress	My Week with Marilyn	Nominated	
2011	Golden Schmoes Award	Best Actress	My Week with Marilyn	Nominated	
2011	Houston Film Critics Society	Best Actress	My Week with Marilyn	Nominated	
2011	Iowa Film Critics Award	Best Actress	My Week with Marilyn	Nominated	
2011	Italian Online Movie Awards	Best Actress	My Week with Marilyn	Nominated	
2011	London Film Critics' Circle	Actress of the Year	My Week with Marilyn	Nominated	
2011	Online Film Critics Society	Best Actress	My Week with Marilyn	Nominated	
2011	Phoenix Film Critics Society	Best Actress	My Week with Marilyn	Nominated	
2011	Rembrandt Award	Best International Actress	My Week with Marilyn	Nominated	
2011	San Diego Film Critics Society	Best Actress	My Week with Marilyn	Nominated	
2011	St. Louis Gateway Film Critics Association	Best Actress	My Week with Marilyn	Nominated	
2011	Utah Film Critics Association	Best Actress	My Week with Marilyn	Nominated	
2011	Vancouver Film Critics Circle	Best Actress	My Week with Marilyn	Nominated	
2012	San Diego Film Critics Society	Best Actress	Take This Waltz	Won	
2012	Vancouver Film Critics Circle	Best Actress in a Canadian Film	Take This Waltz	Won	
2012	Village Voice Film Poll	Best Actress	Take This Waltz	10th place	
2012	Detroit Film Critics Society	Best Actress	Take This Waltz	Nominated	
2016	Drama League Award	Distinguished Performance	Blackbird	Nominated	
2016	Outer Critics Circle Award	Outstanding Actress in a Play	Blackbird	Nominated	
2016	Awards Circuit Community	Best Supporting Actress	Manchester by the Sea	Won	
2016	Boston Online Film Critics Association	Best Supporting Actress	Manchester by the Sea	Won	
2016	Chicago Film Critics Association	Best Supporting Actress	Manchester by the Sea	Won	
2016	Florida Film Critics Circle	Best Supporting Actress	Manchester by the Sea	Won	
2016	National Society of Film Critics	Best Supporting Actress	Manchester by the Sea	Won	
2016	San Diego Film Critics Society	Best Supporting Actress	Manchester by the Sea	Won	
2016	Santa Barbara International Film Festival	Cinema Vanguard Award	Manchester by the Sea	Won	
2016	Toronto Film Critics Association	Best Supporting Actress	Manchester by the Sea	Won	
2016	Vancouver Film Critics Circle	Best Supporting Actress	Manchester by the Sea	Won	
2016	Boston Society of Film Critics	Best Supporting Actress	Manchester by the Sea	Runner-up	
2016	St. Louis Gateway Film Critics Association	Best Supporting Actress	Manchester by the Sea	Runner-up	
2016	Alliance of Women Film Journalists	Best Supporting Actress	Manchester by the Sea	Nominated	
2016	Austin Film Critics Association	Best Supporting Actress	Manchester by the Sea	Nominated	
2016	Awards Circuit Community	Best Cast Ensemble	Manchester by the Sea	Nominated	
2016	Blogos de Oro Award	Best Actress	Manchester by the Sea	Nominated	
2016	Central Ohio Film Critics Association	Best Supporting Actress	Manchester by the Sea	Nominated	
2016	Chicago Independent Film Critics Circle	Best Supporting Actress	Manchester by the Sea	Nominated	
2016	Chlotrudis Award	Best Actress	Manchester by the Sea	Nominated	
2016	Dallas–Fort Worth Film Critics Association	Best Supporting Actress	Manchester by the Sea	Nominated	
2016	Denver Film Critics Society	Best Supporting Actress	Manchester by the Sea	Nominated	
2016	Detroit Film Critics Society	Best Supporting Actress	Manchester by the Sea	Nominated	
2016	Georgia Film Critics Association	Best Supporting Actress	Manchester by the Sea	Nominated	
2016	Houston Film Critics Society	Best Supporting Actress	Manchester by the Sea	Nominated	
2016	San Francisco Film Critics Circle	Best Supporting Actress	Manchester by the Sea	Nominated	
2016	Washington D.C. Area Film Critics Association	Best Supporting Actress	Manchester by the Sea	Nominated	
2016	New York Film Critics Circle	Best Supporting Actress	Manchester by the Sea / Certain Women	Won	
2017	Central Ohio Film Critics Association	Actor of the Year	Manchester by the Sea / Certain Women	Nominated	
2022	Chicago Film Critics Association	Best Supporting Actress	The Fabelmans	Nominated	
2022	Dallas–Fort Worth Film Critics Association	Best Actress	The Fabelmans	Nominated	
2022	Florida Film Critics Circle	Best Actress	The Fabelmans	Nominated	
2022	Washington D.C. Area Film Critics Association	Best Actress	The Fabelmans	Nominated	
2022	St. Louis Gateway Film Critics Association	Best Actress	The Fabelmans	Nominated	
2023	Palm Springs International Film Festival	Chairman's Vanguard Award	The Fabelmans	Won	
2023	San Diego Film Critics Society	Best Actress	The Fabelmans	Nominated	
2023	National Society of Film Critics	Best Actress	The Fabelmans	3rd place	
2023	Georgia Film Critics Association	Best Actress	The Fabelmans	Nominated	
2023	Hollywood Critics Association	Best Actress	The Fabelmans	Nominated	
