= San Francisco Film Critics Circle Awards 2010 =

Annual US film awards ceremony

9th SFFCC Awards

December 13, 2010

Best Picture:
The Social Network

The 9th San Francisco Film Critics Circle Awards, honoring the best in film for 2010, were given on 13 December 2010.

== Winners ==
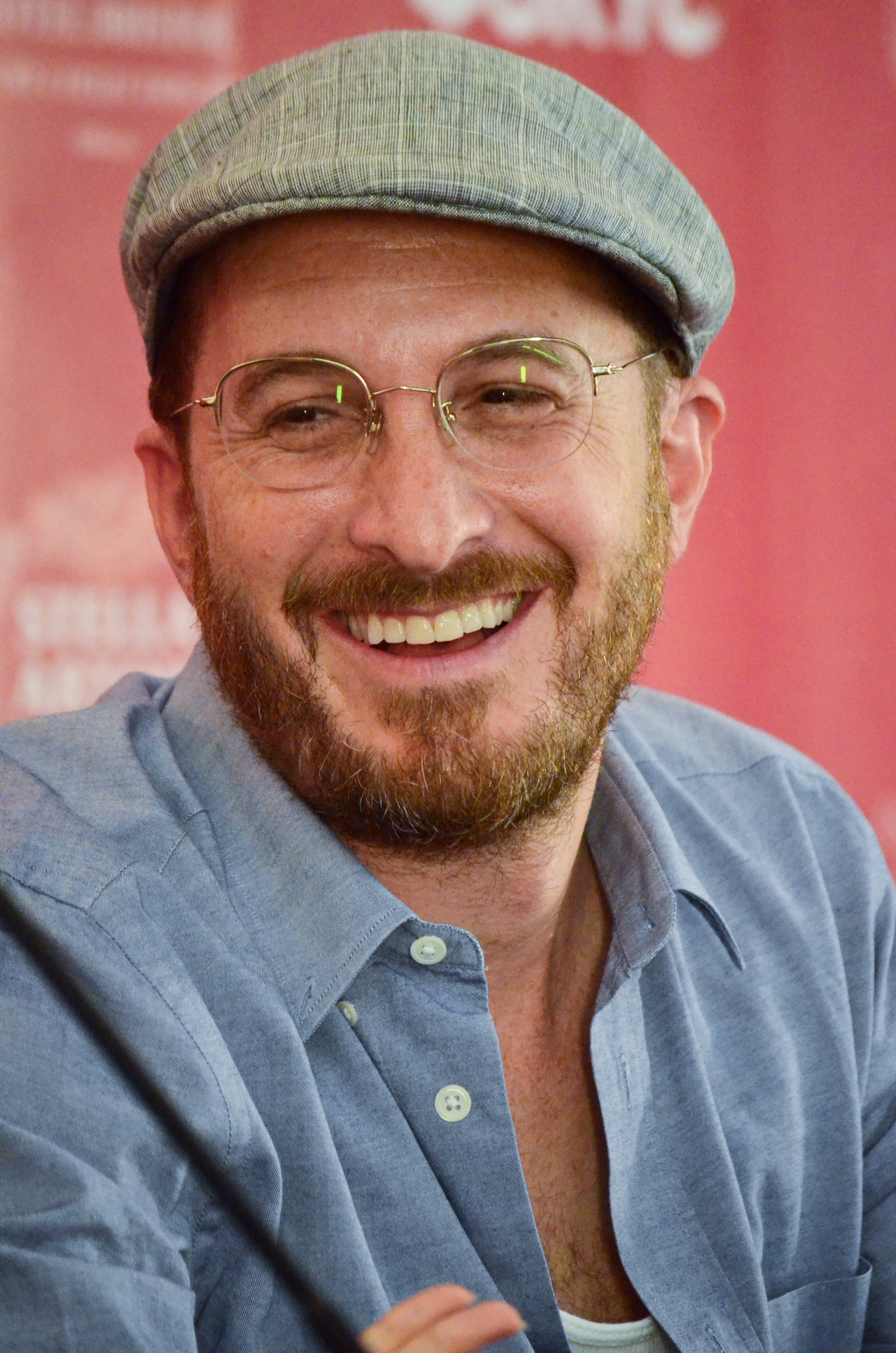
Darren Aronofsky, Best Director co-winner

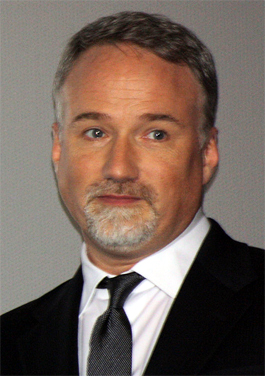
David Fincher, Best Director co-winner

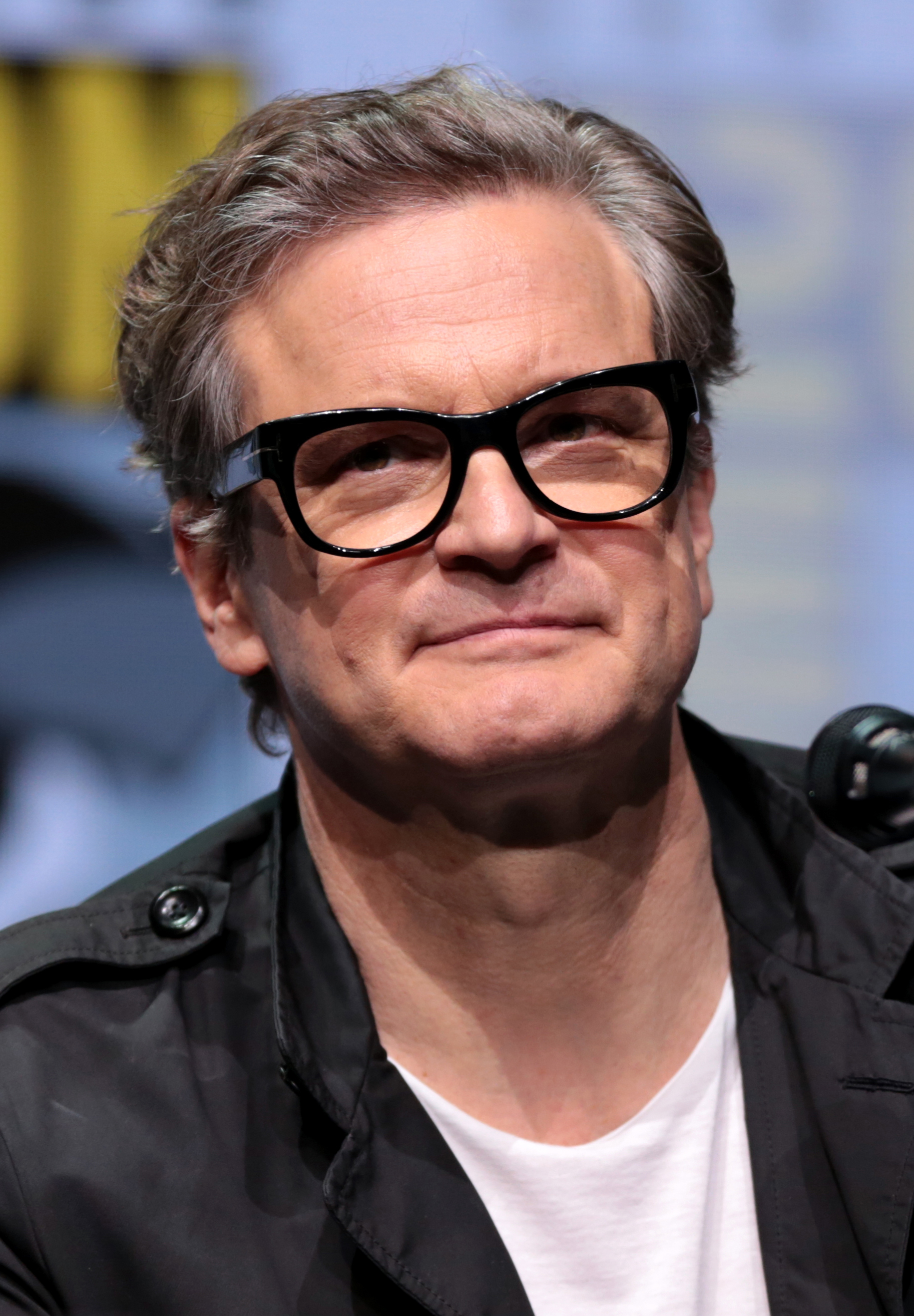
Colin Firth, Best Actor winner

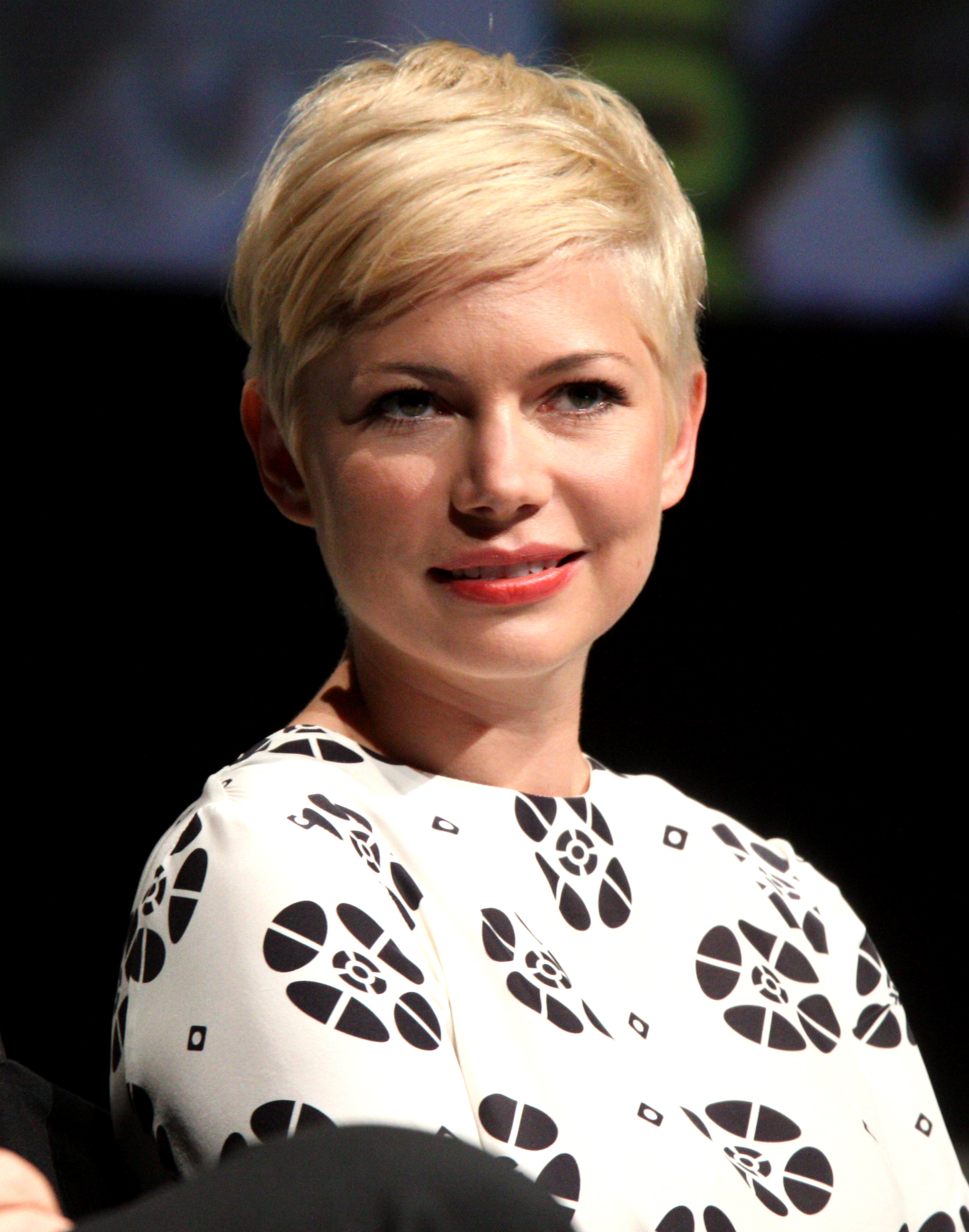
Michelle Williams, Best Actress winner

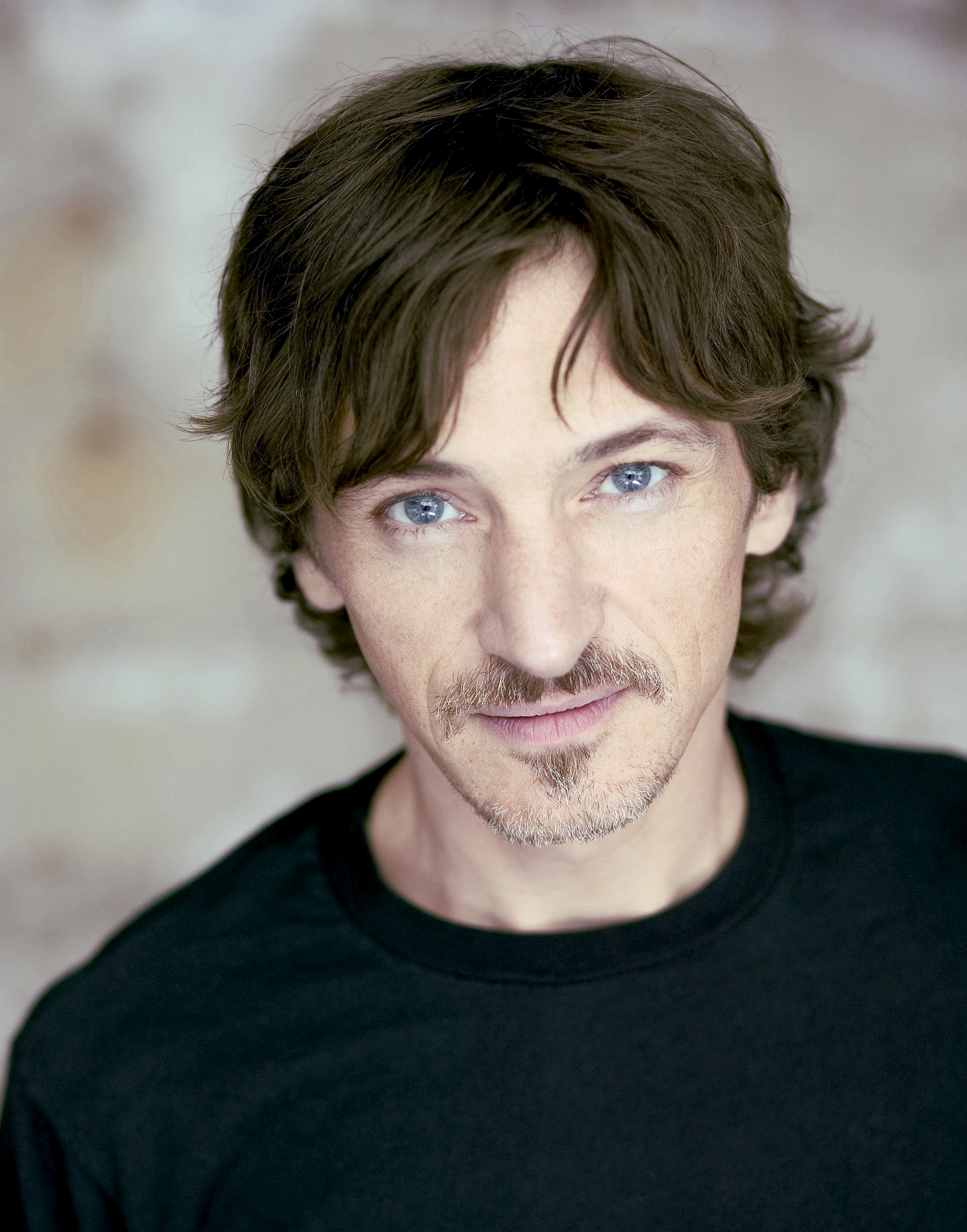
John Hawkes, Best Supporting Actor winner

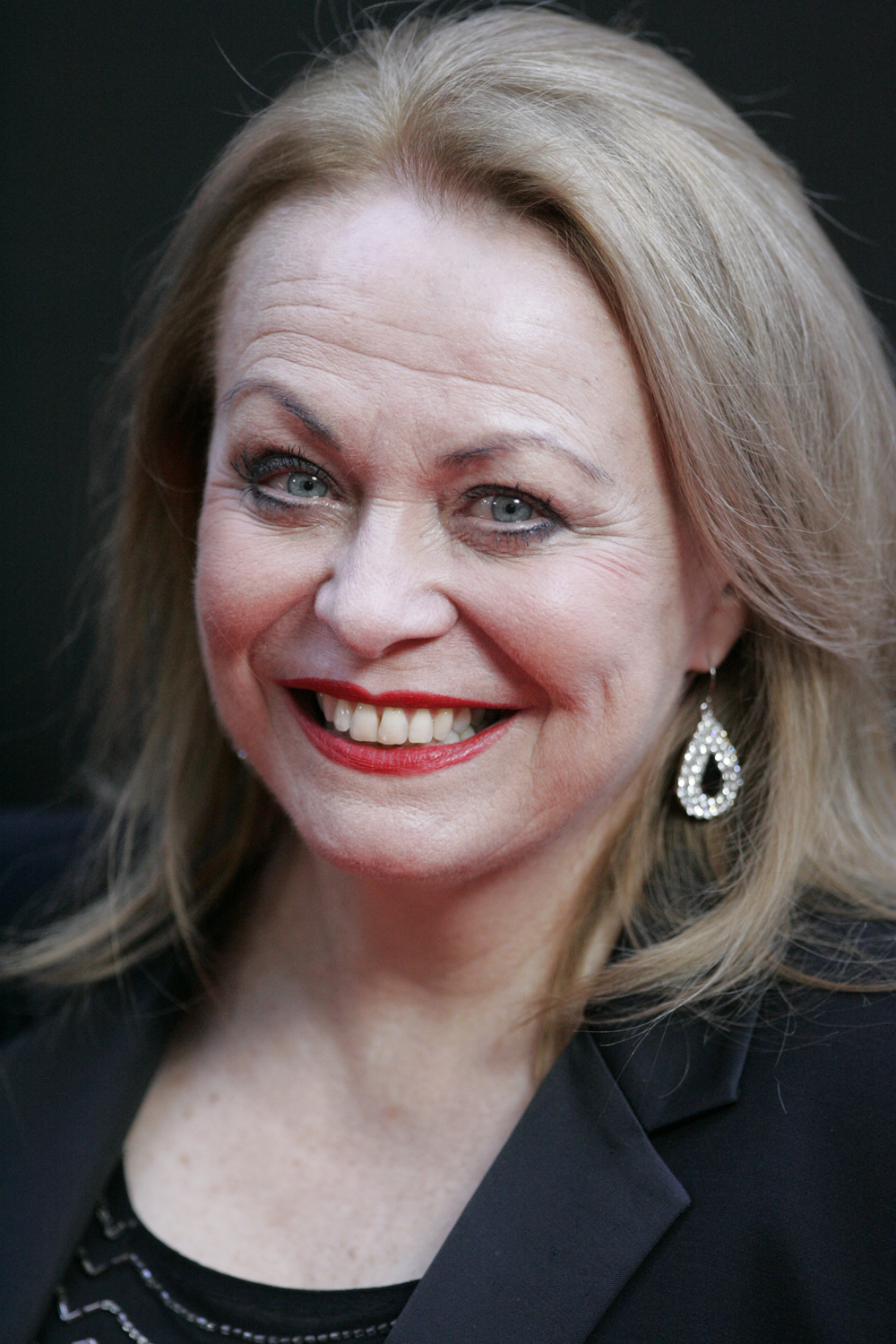
Jacki Weaver, Best Supporting Actress winner

- Best Picture:
  - The Social Network
- Best Director (TIE):
  - Darren Aronofsky – Black Swan
  - David Fincher – The Social Network
- Best Original Screenplay:
  - The King's Speech – David Seidler
- Best Adapted Screenplay:
  - The Social Network – Aaron Sorkin
- Best Actor:
  - Colin Firth – The King's Speech
- Best Actress:
  - Michelle Williams – Blue Valentine
- Best Supporting Actor:
  - John Hawkes – Winter's Bone
- Best Supporting Actress:
  - Jacki Weaver – Animal Kingdom
- Best Animated Feature:
  - Toy Story 3
- Best Foreign Language Film:
  - Mother (Madeo) • South Korea
- Best Documentary:
  - The Tillman Story
- Best Cinematography:
  - Black Swan – Matthew Libatique
- Marlon Riggs Award (for courage & vision in the Bay Area film community):
  - Elliot Lavine (in recognition of his two decades of film programming, his revival of rare archival and independent titles, and his role in the renewed popularity of film noir and pre-Production Code features)
