= Blue Valentine (film) =

2010 American romantic drama film by Derek Cianfrance

- Theatrical release poster
- Directed by: Derek Cianfrance
- Written by: Derek Cianfrance; Joey Curtis; Cami Delavigne
- Produced by: Lynette Howell; Alex Orlovsky; Jamie Patricof
- Starring: Ryan Gosling; Michelle Williams
- Cinematography: Andrij Parekh
- Edited by: Jim Helton; Ron Patane
- Music by: Grizzly Bear
- Production companies: Hunting Lane Films; Silverwood Films
- Distributed by: The Weinstein Company
- Release dates: January 24, 2010 (Sundance); May 18, 2010 (Cannes); December 29, 2010 (United States)
- Running time: 112 minutes
- Country: United States
- Language: English
- Budget: $1 million
- Box office: $16.6 million

Blue Valentine is a 2010 American romantic drama film directed by Derek Cianfrance and co-written by Cianfrance, Joey Curtis, and Cami Delavigne. Starring Ryan Gosling and Michelle Williams, the film follows the dysfunctional relationship between Dean (Gosling) and Cindy (Williams) as they struggle to raise their daughter, juxtaposing the beginnings of their romance with the eventual decline of their marriage several years later.

Blue Valentine premiered at the Sundance Film Festival on January 24, 2010, where it was nominated for the Grand Jury Prize, and was screened in the Un Certain Regard section at the Cannes Film Festival on May 18, 2010. The film was theatrically released in the United States on December 29, 2010, to widespread acclaim, with particular praise for Gosling's and Williams' performances. It was also a box office success, grossing $16.6 million against its $1 million production budget.

The film received three nominations at the 15th Satellite Awards, Best Motion Picture – Drama, Best Actor in a Motion Picture – Drama for Gosling, and Best Actress in a Motion Picture – Drama for Williams. At the 68th Golden Globe Awards, Gosling was nominated for Best Actor in a Motion Picture – Drama and Williams was nominated for Best Actress in a Motion Picture – Drama. Williams received a nomination for the Academy Award for Best Actress at the 83rd Academy Awards and the Independent Spirit Award for Best Female Lead at the 26th Independent Spirit Awards.

== Plot ==
Five-year-old Frankie wakes up her dad Dean. She cannot find their family dog, Megan, and together they look for her outside the Pennsylvania family home, with Dean reassuring Frankie. The gate to Megan's area outside appears to have been left open, implying the dog may have escaped. Dean and Frankie wake up Dean's wife, Cindy, who appears exhausted and annoyed. She reminds the two that Frankie has to get ready for school and cannot be late. While Cindy gets Frankie dressed, gives her breakfast, and gets herself ready for her job, Dean focuses on making Frankie laugh and rebuffs the instant oatmeal breakfast Cindy made for her.

Later that day, Cindy is shown as a nurse at a clinic where her boss, Dr. Feinberg, had just offered her to join him at his new clinic in another city, and inquires if she's discussed moving with her family. Appearing exhausted, she says she hasn't. Meanwhile, Dean is shown to be painting house interiors for work, later driving around while drinking a beer. While driving to an event at Frankie's school, Cindy finds Megan dead by the roadside. She arrives late to the event. Dean is already there; when she tells Dean what she found, he blames her for leaving the gate open while she silently breaks down in tears. At home, Dean buries Megan and breaks down and Cindy comforts him. Later, despite Cindy's reluctance because she is scheduled as "on-call" for her job the next day, Dean insists on a getaway at a motel two hours away to "get drunk and make love". They drop-off Frankie with Cindy's dad. Dean does not enter the house; when Cindy asks why, he states he cannot smoke near Cindy's father's oxygen tank. While driving to the motel, Cindy stops by a liquor store and has an awkward encounter with an ex-boyfriend, Bobby, which causes her and Dean to argue when she returns to the car.

Flashbacks reveal that Dean was a hopeless romantic high school dropout, working for a moving company in Brooklyn. Cindy was once an aspiring doctor studying pre-med while living with her parents and caring for her grandmother in Pennsylvania. Her parents have a volatile marriage, with her dad verbally abusing her mother. She is dating Bobby, a fellow student, and one day they have sex during which he ejaculates inside her without her consent. He later brings flowers to her at her parents' house but gets angry when she doesn't accept his apology, causing Cindy to shut him out.

Upon arriving at the motel, Dean tries to seduce Cindy in the shower and afterwards but she rebuffs him. Dean and Cindy proceed to drink alcohol. Overwhelmed by his advances and frustrated with his lack of ambition, she questions Dean while they are drunk which leads to another explosive outburst. Dean continues his advances and Cindy gives in, but is disappointed when Dean asks if she wants to have another child with him. Their argument becomes explosive again and she locks the door between them, leaving him outside the bedroom. Early in the morning, while Dean is still sleeping, Cindy is called in for work. She takes the car and leaves a note for Dean. At the clinic, Dr. Feinberg recommends that Cindy move into an apartment near the new clinic instead of moving her family, off-handedly suggesting that they could keep each other company if she is lonely.

More flashbacks reveal that while Dean is delivering furniture to a nursing home in Pennsylvania, he first sees Cindy, who is visiting her grandmother. Initially pushy with his advances, he gives her his work number but she never calls. Dean contrives a way to meet her again on a bus and they begin dating. After discovering their relationship, a jealous Bobby and two of his friends violently assault Dean while he is at work. Cindy finds out she is pregnant and tells Dean she is not sure who the father is, and that it is not likely to be his child. Dean repeatedly questions her on what she is going to do. She ends up opting for an abortion but, overwhelmed, changes her mind during the procedure, while Dean waits for her in the clinic. Dean comforts and reassures her that they can raise the child together. Cindy and Dean soon get married at a Justice of the Peace.

At the motel, Dean finds the note upon waking and, annoyed, is forced to take a bus back home. He shows up drunk at Cindy's job and forces his way in while yelling at her, as the clinic receptionist attempts to intervene. They have a heated argument. Dr. Feinberg hears the commotion, and when he also attempts to intervene, Dean punches him. Dr. Feinberg then fires Cindy, threatens to call the cops on Dean, and kicks them both out. While leaving, Cindy demands a divorce, causing Dean to throw away his wedding ring, but then attempts to look for it, with her helping him. Back at her parents' house, Dean tearfully pleads with Cindy to give the marriage another chance for Frankie. Cindy says she doesn't want Frankie to grow up with parents who despise each other like she did, and that she cannot cope with his behaviour. After Dean reminds Cindy of their wedding vows, they hug, but she pulls away and asks for some space. Dean leaves the house while Frankie runs after him and begs him to stay. He tells her to return to Cindy and then continues walking away. Frankie cries in Cindy's arms.

== Cast ==
- Ryan Gosling as Dean Pereira
- Michelle Williams as Cynthia "Cindy" Heller Pereira
- John Doman as Jerry Heller
- Mike Vogel as Bobby Ontario
- Ben Shenkman as Dr. Feinberg
- Jen Jones as Gramma
- Maryann Plunkett as Glenda
- Faith Wladyka as Frankie Pereira

== Production ==
Williams was 21 when she received the script in 2002 and Gosling committed to the production four years later, but filming did not begin until 2009, when Williams was 28 (as was Gosling), owing to Cianfrance's inability to find financing. The director was also unable to film the "young" and "older" scenes several years apart as he had hoped, again due to lack of money. Before Gosling's casting, Channing Tatum was offered the role of Dean, but turned it down, a decision he later regretted. The film was to be shot in California but production was moved to Brooklyn and Honesdale, Pennsylvania. Because her partner Heath Ledger died the previous year, Williams wanted to stay close to her Brooklyn home to take care of their daughter, Matilda. Accordingly, the director chose Honesdale due to its proximity to Brooklyn. Filming began on 12 May 2009.

I took a compass and (...) literally put one point of the compass on her house, and I drew a circle, an hour diameter around her house, and it just touched Scranton, Pennsylvania. So the next day I drove to Scranton (...) and we said, 'We're shooting here'.

— Derek Cianfrance

Gosling and Williams improvised dialogue; the scene in which their characters wander through New York together was unscripted, for example; the actors—who had both appeared in The United States of Leland (2003) but had not shared scenes—got to know each other during its filming. Before filming the marriage dissolution between the main characters, Gosling and Williams prepared by renting a home, bringing their own clothing and belongings, buying groceries with a budget based on their characters' incomes, filming home movies and taking a family portrait at a local Sears with the actress who played their daughter, and staging out arguments. Cianfrance visited the actors and assisted them in building tension while remaining in character: "One night he told Gosling to go into Williams' bedroom and try to make love to her. Gosling, soundly rejected, ended up sleeping on the couch."

The film was shot in Super 16mm and Red One. The former was used for the pre-marriage scenes and the latter was used for the post-marriage scenes. Andrij Parekh used only one professional light in the filming of the outside scenes, otherwise using only practical lights for the inside scenes.

Cianfrance said that he had given up his entire director's fee to help fund the film: "I mean, it came down to we were exactly my fee short. They paid me and I just paid it back. So I still have to pay taxes on it, you know. So I actually had to pay to make the movie."

=== Music ===
Gosling wrote and performed some songs by himself. The band Grizzly Bear composed the score of the film. A soundtrack for the film was released by Lakeshore Records.

"You and Me", one of the film's feature songs, which is presented as the couple's personal song, was originally recorded as a demo by a group called Penny & The Quarters for the obscure Prix Label of Columbus, Ohio, in the early 1970s. It was re-released on a compilation album by The Numero Group in 2007 without the members of the group being identified.

== Release ==
The film premiered in competition at the 26th Sundance Film Festival. The film was screened in the Un Certain Regard section at the 2010 Cannes Film Festival and premiered at the Toronto International Film Festival on September 15, 2010. In Australia, the film was released on December 26, 2010, through Palace Films. In the United States, it was distributed by The Weinstein Company as a limited release on December 29, 2010.

=== Rating ===
On October 8, 2010, Blue Valentine was given an NC-17 rating by the MPAA for American cinemas. This was due to a scene depicting cunnilingus. Gosling accused the MPAA of sexism and misogyny. "There's plenty of oral sex scenes in a lot of movies, where it's a man receiving it from a woman – and they're R-rated. Ours is reversed and somehow it's perceived as pornographic", he stated. The Weinstein Company appealed the decision and aimed for an R without any trims to the film, believing the prior decision would significantly harm the film's potential box office take in the United States. The appeal was successful on December 8, 2010, and the film received an R rating.

The film was given an uncut 15 certificate from the British Board of Film Classification.

=== Home media ===
The film was released on DVD and Blu-ray on May 10, 2011. Special features include an audio commentary with director Derek Cianfrance, a making-of documentary, deleted scenes, and home movies. The film has grossed $5,336,207 through US video sales.

== Reception ==
=== Critical response ===
Blue Valentine received critical acclaim. Rotten Tomatoes reports that 87% of 211 surveyed critics gave the film a positive review; the average rating is 7.80/10. The website's critical consensus states: "This emotionally gripping examination of a marriage on the rocks isn't always easy to watch, but Michelle Williams and Ryan Gosling give performances of unusual depth and power." On Metacritic, the film has an average score of 81 out of 100 based on 42 reviews, meaning "universal acclaim".

Roger Ebert of the Chicago Sun-Times gave the film three and a half out of four stars, and wrote: "Dean seems stuck. He seems to stay fixed at the initial stage. Can you see the difference between (1) 'He loves me as much as he always did', and (2) 'He loves me exactly like he always did'? ...

=== Top ten lists ===
Blue Valentine was listed on many critics' top ten lists of 2010.

- 1st – Nathan Rabin, The A.V. Club
- 1st – Mick LaSalle, San Francisco Chronicle
- 1st – Joe Neumaier, New York Daily News
- 2nd – Drew McWeeny, HitFix
- 3rd – Claudia Puig, USA Today
- 4th – Andrew O'Hehir, Salon.com
- 4th – Peter Hartlaub, San Francisco Chronicle
- 4th – Steve Persall, Tampa Bay Times
- 6th – Chuck Wilson, LA Weekly
- 6th – Mike Scott, The Times-Picayune/The New Orleans Advocate
- 7th – Owen Gleiberman, Entertainment Weekly
- 7th – Clint O'Conner, The Plain Dealer
- 8th – Rene Rodriguez, Miami Herald
- Top 10 (listed alphabetically) – Dana Stevens, Slate
- Top 10 (listed alphabetically) – Joe Williams, St. Louis Post-Dispatch

=== Accolades ===
In 2006, the script won the Chrysler Film Project, a competition that awards cash to an outstanding new feature film director overseen by Independent Feature Project.

List of awards and nominations
Association	Year	Category	Recipient(s)	Result	Ref.
Academy Awards	2010	Best Actress	Michelle Williams	Nominated	
Casting Society of America	2010	Outstanding Casting - Low Budget Feature – Drama/Comedy	Cindy Tolan, Richard Hicks (LA Casting Consultant), David Rubin (LA Casting Consultant)	Nominated	
Chicago Film Critics Association Awards	2010	Best Actor	Ryan Gosling	Nominated	
Chicago Film Critics Association Awards	2010	Best Actress	Michelle Williams	Nominated	
Chicago Film Critics Association Awards	2010	Most Promising Filmmaker	Derek Cianfrance	Won	
Golden Globe Awards	2010	Best Actor – Motion Picture Drama	Ryan Gosling	Nominated	
Golden Globe Awards	2010	Best Actress – Motion Picture Drama	Michelle Williams	Nominated	
Gotham Independent Film Awards	2010	Best Film		Nominated	
Independent Spirit Awards	2010	Best Actress	Michelle Williams	Nominated	
London Film Critics Circle Awards	2010	Best Actor	Ryan Gosling	Nominated	
Online Film Critics Society Awards	2010	Best Actor	Ryan Gosling	Nominated	
San Diego Film Critics Society Awards	2010	Best Actress	Michelle Williams	Nominated	
San Francisco Film Critics Circle Awards	2010	Best Actress	Michelle Williams	Won	
Satellite Awards	2010	Best Film		Nominated	
Satellite Awards	2010	Best Actor	Ryan Gosling	Nominated	
Satellite Awards	2010	Best Actress	Michelle Williams	Nominated	
