= Lassie (1994 film) =

1994 film by Daniel Petrie

- Theatrical release poster
- Directed by: Daniel Petrie
- Written by: Eric Knight; Matthew Jacobs; Gary Ross; Elizabeth Anderson
- Produced by: Lorne Michaels
- Starring: Thomas Guiry; Helen Slater; Jon Tenney; Frederic Forrest; Richard Farnsworth
- Cinematography: Kenneth MacMillan
- Edited by: Steve Mirkovich
- Music by: Basil Poledouris
- Production company: Broadway Video
- Distributed by: Paramount Pictures
- Release date: July 22, 1994
- Running time: 94 minutes
- Country: United States
- Language: English
- Box office: $10 million

Lassie, or Lassie: Best Friends are Forever, is a 1994 American adventure family film directed by Daniel Petrie, starring Tom Guiry, Helen Slater, Jon Tenney, Frederic Forrest, Richard Farnsworth, and Michelle Williams, and featuring the fictional collie Lassie.

Lassie was released by Paramount Pictures on July 22, 1994. The film received positive reviews from critics and grossed $10 million.

== Plot ==
The Turner family moves from Baltimore, Maryland, to the small town of Franklin Falls in Tazewell County, Virginia, hoping to start a new life. The move creates problems for everyone, especially 13-year-old Matt, who feels lost and alone in his new surroundings, and still has not come to terms with his father Steve's remarriage to Laura after his mother's death. But with the help of a stray Collie dog named Lassie that the family takes in, Matt learns to adjust to his surroundings and his family's situation. After Lassie saves Matt's life from an aggressive gray wolf one night, the two form a bond.

However, as his father's planned job falls through, Matt, with help from his grandfather, Len Collins, helps convince the family to start a sheep farm, which had been his mother's dream. While the Turners get to work, a ruthless neighbor and wealthy sheep farmer, Sam Garland, will stop at nothing to prevent them from succeeding, because it means that they will be occupying some grazing land that he's used in the past. In addition, Sam has two sons, Josh and Jim who attend school with Matt. Both boys dislike Matt, but Josh's hatred mainly stems from jealousy because a fellow student, April Porter, whom Josh likes, is more interested in Matt.

Eventually Sam, with the help of his sons and henchmen, steals the Turners’ new herd of sheep, and kidnaps Lassie. However, she manages to escape, and she and Matt get their sheep back. However Josh and Jim catch up to them, and in the ensuing scuffle Josh finds himself struggling in a raging river, heading for massive rapids and a waterfall. Matt manages to rescue him, but is unable to save himself. Lassie then rescues Matt, but ends up going over the waterfall herself, to Matt's horror. Sam, after learning that Matt had saved Josh's life, apologizes to the Turners for his actions and for the loss of Lassie. The Turners hold a memorial for Lassie at a nearby tree where Matt's mother had carved her initials years before, and Matt carves Lassie's name above his mother's initials. However, Lassie manages to survive the waterfall, and although injured, she returns home shortly afterwards and is reunited with Matt at his school.

== Cast ==
- Howard as Lassie
- Thomas Guiry as Matthew Turner, Lassie's new owner
- Helen Slater as Laura Turner, Matthew's stepmother
- Jon Tenney as Steve Turner, Matthew's widowed father
- Frederic Forrest as Sam Garland, the neighbor of the Turners
- Richard Farnsworth as Len Collins, Matthew's maternal grandfather
- Brittany Boyd as Jennifer Turner, Matthew's younger sister
- Michelle Williams as April Porter, Matthew's love interest
- Charlie Hofheimer as Jim Garland, Sam's first son
- Clayton Barclay Jones as Josh Garland, Sam's second son
- Jody Smith Strickler as Mildred Garland, Sam's wife
- Joe Inscoe as Pete Jarman
- Yvonne Brisendine as Mrs. Jarman
- Margaret Peery as Mrs. Parker
- David Bridgewater as Customer
- Earnest Poole Jr. as Highway Patrolman #1
- Jeffrey H. Gray as Highway Patrolman #2
- Robert B. Brittain as Grommet Fireman
- Rick Warner as Timid Neighbor
- Kelly L. Edwards as Smoking Girl
- Jordan Young as Smoking Boy
- Katie Massa as College Student

== Production ==
In June 1993, it was announced Lorne Michaels would be producing a new Lassie film through his production company Broadway Video Matthew Jacobs was first announced as writer for the film while Richard Pearce was announced as director. In August of that year, it was reported Gary Ross was providing additional rewrites on the script. Later that same month, it was reported Daniel Petrie after Pearce departed the project due to Paramount Pictures forcing a rushed production schedule on the film.

== Reception ==
Lassie was released to positive reviews.

Peter Rainer of the Los Angeles Times, stated that "one of the drawbacks of the film’s syrupy approach—at least from a family-entertainment point of view—is that you keep waiting for danger and bad guys to liven things up. And, sure enough, the presence of Frederic Forrest as Sam Garland, the biggest and baddest sheep farmer in the state, turns out to be a boon. Perpetually scowling and sunglass-clad, Sam is a rude dude; he looks over his flock of sheep and sees only lamb chops on the hoof. His two young sons (Charlie Hofheimer and Clayton Barclay Jones) are like a pair of range-riding homunculi. You keep expecting the Garlands to get seriously nutty and take over the picture—maybe try to mate Lassie with a lamb, or spike the ol’ swimmin’ hole, or force-feed Matt's kindly granddad (Richard Farnsworth) Puppy Chow. The producer of 'Lassie,' after all, is Lorne Michaels, executive producer of 'Saturday Night Live.' But even the Garlands are ultimately redeemed by the love of a dog. Their bark is worse than their bite. (On the other hand, Lassie's bite is worse than her bark. Go figure.)"

Janet Maslin of The New York Times called Lassie "a stubbornly sweet, picturesque children's film" which "is inadvertently revealing about the people for whom it was ostensibly made. The mood is nostalgic but knowing; after all, no dog story with a soundtrack featuring the Beatles, Bob Dylan and the Allman Brothers can be considered precisely quaint. This film (from the producers of 'Coneheads') even presumes a degree of viewer cynicism about Lassie lore. Early in the story, a little girl named Jennifer Turner (Brittany Boyd) watches "Lassie" on television while her older, hipper brother Matt (Thomas Guiry) sneers. Matt doesn't believe in Santa Claus, and he doesn't think a 50's canine rerun can beat MTV." Maslin added:

"Lassie," directed in prettily innocuous fashion by Daniel Petrie, is too intent on a vague feel-good spirit to provide real conflict. The film's villains, a rich sheep-ranching family headed by Sam Garland (Frederic Forrest), are more obnoxious than evil. Chewing tobacco, toting guns and disparaging animals (sheep are "just wool and good eatin'") are their principal sins. For today's viewers, maybe that's supposed to be wickedness enough. Lassie, a live-action, non-animatronic, eighth-generation descendant of the original star, is exactly what might be expected: a dog who appears to be responding to the orders of an off-screen trainer. With a more limited range of stunts and expressions than past canine actors have had, this Lassie depends on the camera, the adoring actors and the swelling soundtrack to turn her into a love object. Of course, she gets some help from our memories.

Lisa Schwarzbaum of Entertainment Weekly gave the film an A− grade and said that the film was "a remarkably clean, bracing production that does a difficult thing exceptionally well, depicting believably modern young people in a believably old-fashioned plot."

As of January 2026, the film holds a "fresh" rating of 88% on Rotten Tomatoes, based on 17 reviews.

=== Box office ===
The movie debuted at No. 9 at the US box office.
