= Snoop.ro =

Romanian investigative media

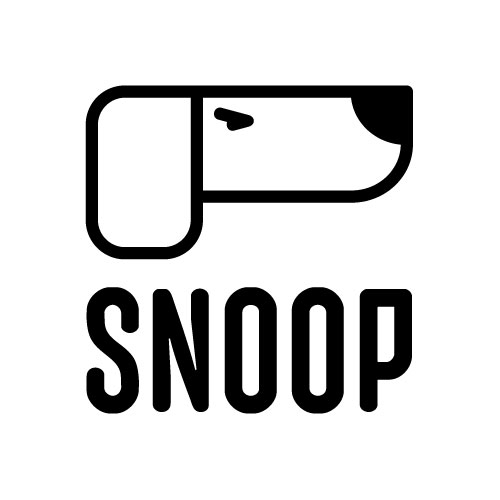
- Type: Investigative media
- Format: Website
- Publisher: Dan Duca
- Editor-in-chief: Iulia Roșu, Răzvan Luțac
- Staff writers: Cătălin Tolontan, Mirela Neag, Cristian Andrei, Ioana Moldoveanu, Alexandra Nistoroiu, Cristina Radu, Medeea Stan, Adela Cioruță, Victor Ilie, Luiza Vasiliu
- Founded: 2024
- Language: Romanian; English
- Headquarters: Bucharest
- Country: Romania
- Website: www.snoop.ro

Snoop.ro, also known as Snoop, is an investigative media based in Bucharest, Romania.

== Foundation ==
Snoop.ro was founded in 2024 by former Gazeta Sporturilor and Libertatea reporters who left after their coordinator Cătălin Tolontan and the deputy editor-in-chief Iulia Roșu were dismissed at the end of 2023. Ioana Moldoveanu joined from RISE Project.

== Background ==
Part of the Snoop investigative team published in Gazeta Sporturilor the investigation that led to the 2016 diluted disinfectants crisis in Romania, the resignation of the Health minister Patriciu Achimaș-Cadariu and the Hexi Pharma criminal file. The case was presented in the Collective film, the first Romanian movie nominated for an Academy Award.

Two former Romanian ministers were also convicted following two Gazeta Sporturilor investigations led by Cătălin Tolontan, one of the Snoop co-founders. In February 2015, Monica Iacob Ridzi, former head of the Ministry of Youth and Sport, received a 5-year prison sentence for abuse of office in relation to the 2009 Youth Day.

In April 2022, Elena Udrea, former head of the Ministry of Regional Development and Tourism, was convicted to 6 years in prison after the Gala Bute file, started after a Gazeta Sporturilor investigation led by Cătălin Tolontan and Mirela Neag.

In 2019, a Libertatea investigation regarding the fake surgeon Matteo Politi, published by Tolontan, Neag, Răzvan Luțac and Alexandra Nistoroiu, all journalists of Snoop, gained international attention, being cited by The New York Times or ANSA. Politi was eventually arrested and convicted in 2023.

Cătălin Tolontan (2015) and Cristian Andrei (2022), two of the current Snoop team members, won the Ion Rațiu Journalism award, the latter for his articles regarding the funding mechanisms of Romanian media outlets fuelled by the budget of the largest parties in Romania.

== Notable Investigations ==
=== Alfred Bulai ===
In July 2024, Ioana Moldoveanu published a story about the influential sociologist and political analyst Alfred Bulai, a professor and head of the Department of Sociology at the National University of Political Studies and Public Administration (SNSPA) in Bucharest.

Snoop wrote that Bulai requested female students to undress in front of him during private meetings in his hotel room, under the pretext of providing academic feedback. Bulai was dismissed after a few days, being arrested in September 2024.

French newspaper Le Monde wrote that, after the Snoop investigation, the metoo movement was relaunched in Romania. Prime-minister Marcel Ciolacu announced that the victime of sexual harassment would be able to file anonymous complaints.

=== Nicolae Ciucă billboards ===
In August 2024, Cristian Andrei published a story regarding the allocation of substantial public funds in promoting presidential candidate Nicolae Ciucă's book.

Between May and August 2024, the National Liberal Party spent approximately €2 million from state subsidies to advertise Ciucă's book on 400 street billboards nationwide.

The use of public funds for promoting a personal project has sparked public debate. In response, George Simion, president of the Alliance for the Unity of Romanians (AUR), filed a criminal complaint against PNL for allegedly misusing state subsidies.

=== PNL funding Călin Georgescu's TikTok campaign ===
Snoop reported on December 20, 2024, that according to confidential sources from Romania's National Agency for Fiscal Administration (ANAF), it was Romania's own National Liberal Party that financed one of the social media campaigns of Călin Georgescu, the far-right, pro-Russian presidential candidate.

The story was cited worldwide by media outlets like Politico, The New York Times or TF1.

== See also ==
- Communications media in Romania
