= Cătălin Tolontan =

Romanian journalist (born 1968)

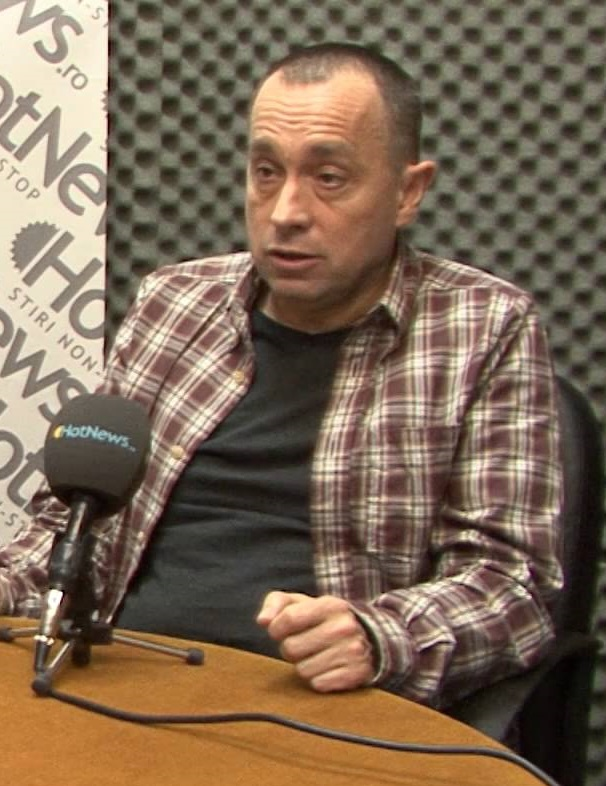
- Tolontan in 2014
- Born: November 16, 1968 (age 57); Bucharest, Socialist Republic of Romania
- Education: Bucharest Academy of Economic Studies
- Occupation: Journalist
- Years active: 1990–present
- Employer(s): Hotnews.ro, Snoop.ro

Cătălin Tolontan (born 16 November 1968) is a Romanian sports journalist and editor known for his investigative work for the sports newspaper Gazeta Sporturilor. His investigation into the deaths of victims of the 2015 Colectiv nightclub fire was featured in the 2019 documentary film Collective. He is now the editorial coordinator at Hotnews.ro and co-founder of the investigative website Snoop.ro.

== Early life ==
Tolontan was born in Bucharest, the son of a border guard. He said he was inspired to become a journalist after watching the 1976 film All the President's Men when he was a child. After two failed attempts to become a lawyer, Tolontan's first journalistic endeavour was when he wrote articles about football that were pasted on walls next to lifts where he worked at the Computer Science Research Institute.

== Journalistic career ==
Tolontan's first editorial experience was in 1990 when he edited the student newspaper of the Bucharest Academy of Economic Studies. After working as a sports reporter for various publications, in 1997 he succeeded his mentor Ovidiu Ioanițoaia as editor of the sports newspaper ProSport. In addition to sport, Tolontan also covered international stories, including being one of the first Romanian journalists to report from Afghanistan following the fall of the Taliban in 2001. In 2003, Tolontan became editor of Gazeta Sporturilor.

In 2018, after Gazeta Sporturilor was purchased by the Ringier group, Tolontan stepped down as editor, and was replaced by Cătălin Țepelin. Tolontan was the editorial coordinator of Ringier's Romanian newspapers, including Gazeta Sporturilor and Libertatea, the latter of which has been reconfigured as an investigative newspaper.

He currently acts as the editorial coordinator for Hotnews.ro and co-founder of the investigative outlet Snoop.ro.

=== Investigative work ===
==== 2009 Ministry of Youth and Sport embezzlement investigation ====
In 2009, Gazeta Sporturilor published its investigation into Monica Iacob Ridzi, a Democratic Liberal Party politician and head of the Ministry of Youth and Sport, accusing her of embezzlement. Ridzi subsequently resigned from her position, and in 2015 was sentenced to five years in prison for misusing public funds. As part of the investigation, Tolontan decided to publish photographs of Ridzi and Dan Voiculescu, the then-owner of Gazeta Sporturilor, leading to Voiculescu stating "for me, Cătălin Tolontan no longer exists", though Tolontan continued to edit the newspaper.

==== 2015 Ministry of Regional Development and Tourism corruption investigation ====
In 2015, Gazeta Sporturilor published its investigation into Elena Udrea, the then-Minister for Regional Development and Tourism, alleging that she had received bribes to fund a boxing event honouring Lucian Bute. This, along with additional corruption concerns levied against Udrea, led to her receiving a six-year prison sentence in 2018, though she subsequently fled to Costa Rica seeking asylum.

==== 2015 Colectiv nightclub fire corruption investigation ====
In October 2015, a fire broke out at the Colectiv nightclub in Bucharest, killing 64 people. While 26 people died during the fire itself, the majority of victims died in the days and weeks following the fire after contracting infections in hospital. In November 2015, Tolontan received a tip from an anaesthesiologist about the high numbers of victims dying of hospital-borne infections. He led a five-month investigation which found that the disinfective supplied to state hospitals by Hexi Pharma was not effective due to it being secretly diluted, with falsified records obscuring this information. The investigation led to the resignation of Patriciu Achimaș-Cadariu, the Minister of Health, as well as the death of the owner of Hexi Farma, in a car accident which many considered to be a suicide. Tolontan, alongside other journalists from Gazeta Sporturilor, reported receiving threats against themselves and their families as a result of their investigation.

== Recognition ==
Tolontan's investigation into the Colectiv nightclub fire and the 2016 diluted disinfectants crisis were featured in the 2019 documentary film Collective, directed by Alexander Nanau. Collective was nominated for Best Documentary Feature and Best International Feature Film at the 93rd Academy Awards.
