= Boston Society of Film Critics Award for Best Documentary Film =

Annual US film award

The Boston Society of Film Critics Award for Best Documentary Film is one of the annual film awards given by the Boston Society of Film Critics.

== Winners ==
=== 1980s ===
Year	Winner	Director(s)
1980	Charleen or How Long Has This Been Going On?	Ross McElwee
1981	Diaries	
1982	The Atomic Cafe	Jayne Loader and Kevin Rafferty
1983	Say Amen, Somebody	George T. Nierenberg
1984	The Times of Harvey Milk	Rob Epstein
1985	Shoah	Claude Lanzmann
1986	Mother Teresa	Ann Petrie and Jeanette Petrie
1987	Marlene	Maximilian Schell
1988	The Thin Blue Line	Errol Morris
1989	Let's Get Lost	Bruce Weber

=== 1990s ===
Year	Winner	Director(s)
1990	No information	
1991	Paris Is Burning	Jennie Livingston
1992	No information	
1993	Visions of Light	Arnold Glassman and Todd McCarthy
1994	Hoop Dreams	Steve James
1995	Crumb	Terry Zwigoff
1996	Anne Frank Remembered	Jon Blair
1997	Fast, Cheap & Out of Control	Errol Morris
1998	The Big One	Michael Moore
1999	Hands on a Hard Body: The Documentary	S.R. Bindler

=== 2000s ===
Year	Winner	Director(s)
2000	The Eyes of Tammy Faye	Fenton Bailey and Randy Barbato
2001	The Gleaners and I (Les Glaneurs et la glaneuse)	Agnès Varda
2002	The Kid Stays in the Picture	Nanette Burstein and Brett Morgen
2003	Capturing the Friedmans	Andrew Jarecki
2004	Control Room	Jehane Noujaim
2005	Murderball	Henry Alex Rubin and Dana Adam Shapiro
2006	Deliver Us from Evil	Amy Berg
2006	Shut Up & Sing	Barbara Kopple and Cecilia Peck
2007	Crazy Love	Dan Klores and Fisher Stevens
2008	Man on Wire	James Marsh
2009	The Cove	Louie Psihoyos

=== 2010s ===
Year	Winner	Director(s)
2010	Marwencol	Jeff Malmberg
2011	Project Nim	James Marsh
2012	How to Survive a Plague	David France
2013	The Act of Killing	Joshua Oppenheimer
2014	Citizenfour	Laura Poitras
2015	Amy	Asif Kapadia
2016	O.J.: Made in America	Ezra Edelman
2017	Dawson City: Frozen Time	Bill Morrison
2018	Won't You Be My Neighbor?	Morgan Neville
2019	Honeyland	Tamara Kotevska and Ljubomir Stefanov

=== 2020s ===
Year	Winner	Director(s)
2020	Collective	Alexander Nanau
2021	Summer of Soul	Questlove
2022	All the Beauty and the Bloodshed	Laura Poitras
2023	Geographies of Solitude	Jacquelyn Mills
2024	No Other Land	Yuval Abraham, Basel Adra, Hamdan Ballal and Rachel Szor
2025	Afternoons of Solitude	Albert Serra

== Multiple winners ==
- James Marsh - 2
- Errol Morris - 2
- Laura Poitras - 2

== See also ==
- Academy Award for Best Documentary Feature
