= The Atomic Cafe =

1982 documentary film

- Theatrical release poster
- Directed by: Kevin Rafferty; Jayne Loader; Pierce Rafferty
- Written by: Kevin Rafferty; Jayne Loader; Pierce Rafferty
- Produced by: Kevin Rafferty; Jayne Loader; Pierce Rafferty
- Edited by: Kevin Rafferty; Jayne Loader
- Music by: Consultant: Charles Wolfe
- Production company: The Archives Project
- Distributed by: Libra Films
- Release date: March 17, 1982 (New York City)
- Running time: 86 minutes
- Country: United States
- Language: English
- Budget: $300,000
- Box office: $1 million

The Atomic Cafe is a 1982 American documentary film directed by Kevin Rafferty, Jayne Loader and Pierce Rafferty. It is a compilation of clips from newsreels, military training films, and other footage produced in the United States early in the Cold War on the subject of nuclear warfare. Without any narration, the footage is edited and presented in a manner to demonstrate how misinformation and propaganda was used by the U.S. government and popular culture to ease fears about nuclear weapons among the American public.

In 2016, the film was selected for preservation in the United States National Film Registry by the Library of Congress as being "culturally, historically, or aesthetically significant."

== Synopsis ==
The film covers the beginnings of the era of nuclear warfare, created from a broad range of archival material from the 1940s, 1950s and early 1960s including newsreel clips, television news footage, U.S. government-produced films (including military training films), advertisements, television and radio programs. News footage reflected the prevailing understanding of the media and public. The film covers both the impact of the atomic bomb on popular culture and daily life, as well as documents the military's increasing fascination with carrying out more and more dangerous tests. The film opens with footage of the Trinity Test and concludes with a montage of stock footage simulating a nuclear attack on the United States.

Though the topic of atomic holocaust is a grave matter, much of the humor derives from the modern audience's reaction to old training films, such as the Duck and Cover film shown in schools. Another sequence involves footage of US Army training maneuvers in which soldiers are instructed to walk into a mushroom cloud as part of an exercise to study how efficiently the armed forces could kill the survivors of a nuclear bomb strike if Soviet Soldiers ever made it to US soil; prior to the beginning of the exercise, the soldiers are informed, "Viewed from a safe distance, the atomic bomb is one of the most beautiful sights ever seen by man."

=== People shown ===
The following people are shown in excerpts from speeches, interviews and news reports, along with several unnamed actors, civilians, members of the armed forces and narrators: Lloyd Bentsen, William H. P. Blandy, Owen Brewster, Frank Gallop, Lyndon Johnson, Maurice Joyce, Nikita Khrushchev, Brien McMahon, Seymour Melman, George Molan, Richard Nixon, Robert E. Stripling, Val Peterson, George Portell, Bill Burrud, George Putnam, Ronald Reagan, Dwight D. Eisenhower, Joseph Stalin, Douglas MacArthur, Ethel Rosenberg, Julius Rosenberg, Mario Salvadori, Lewis Strauss, Paul Tibbets, Kermit Beahan, Harry S. Truman, and James E. Van Zandt.

== Historical context ==
The Atomic Cafe, referred to as a "compilation verite" with no "voice of God narration" or any recently shot footage, was released at the height of nostalgia and cynicism in America. By 1982, Americans lost much of their faith in their government following the Vietnam War and the Watergate scandal the previous decade, alongside the seemingly never-ending arms race with the Soviet Union. The Atomic Cafe reflects and reinforces this idea as it exposes how the atomic bomb's dangers were downplayed and how the government used films to shape public opinion. Loader, who grew up in 50s-60s Fort Worth, Texas living across the street to E.O. "Soapy" Gillam, better known as the "bomb shelter king of North Texas", while also remembering one of her friends used her family's bunker as a clubhouse/secret party spot, felt compelled to revisiting the era that formed her childhood.

The Atomic Cafe was also released during the Reagan administration's civil defense revival. Barry Posen and Stephen Van Evera explain this revival in their article "Defense Policy and the Reagan Administration: Departure from Containment" published in International Security. They argue that in 1981–82 the Reagan administration was moving from an essentially defensive grand strategy of containment to a more offensive strategy. Due to the greater demands of its more offensive strategy "the Reagan Administration ... proposed the biggest military buildup since the Korean War." Of key relevance to The Atomic Cafe, the Reagan move toward offense included the adoption of a more aggressive nuclear strategy that required a large U.S. nuclear buildup. Containment only required that U.S. strategic nuclear forces be capable of one mission: inflicting unacceptable damage on the Soviet Union even after absorbing an all-out Soviet surprise attack. To this "assured destruction" mission the Reagan administration added a second "counterforce" mission, which required the capacity to launch a nuclear first strike against Soviet strategic nuclear forces that would leave the Soviets unable to inflict unacceptable damage on the U.S. in retaliation. The U.S. had always invested in counterforce but the Reagan administration put even greater emphasis on it. The counterforce mission was far more demanding than the assured destruction mission, and required a vast expansion of U.S. nuclear forces to fulfill. Civil defense was a component of a counterforce strategy, as it reduced Soviet retaliatory capacity, hence civil defense was a candidate for more spending under Reagan's counterforce nuclear strategy. Posen and Van Evera argue that this counterforce strategy was a warrant for an open-ended U.S. nuclear buildup.

Bob Mielke, in "Rhetoric and Ideology in the Nuclear Test Documentary" (Film Quarterly) discusses the release of The Atomic Cafe: "This satire feature was released at the height of the nuclear freeze movement (which was in turn responding to the Reagan administration's surreal handling of the arms race.)"

In "Atomic Café" (Film Quarterly), Fred Glass points out that the technical and cultural background needed to create the film was not available in 1955. The film's themes, critical of government propaganda and the nuclear arms race, would have been seen as unpatriotic during the McCarthy era. And getting the necessary permits and funding to make Atomic Café can be quite difficult.

Patricia Aufderheide, in Documentary Film: A Very Short Introduction touches on the significance of The Atomic Cafe as a window into the past of government propaganda and disinformation during the years following the advent of the atomic bomb.

Propaganda, also known as disinformation, public diplomacy, and strategic communication, continues to be an important tool for governments. But stand-alone documentary is no longer an important part of public relations campaigns aimed at the general public.

It has also been known as a postmodernist film.

== Production ==
The Atomic Cafe was produced over a five-year period through the collaborative efforts of three directors: Jayne Loader and brothers Kevin and Pierce Rafferty. For this film, the Rafferty brothers and Loader formed a production company called The Archives Project. The filmmakers opted not to use narration. Instead, they deployed carefully constructed sequences of film clips to make their points. Jayne Loader has referred to The Atomic Cafe as "compilation verite": a compilation film with no "Voice of God" narration and no new footage added by the filmmakers. The soundtrack utilizes atomic-themed songs from the Cold War era to underscore the themes of the film.

The film cost $300,000 to make. The group did receive some financial support from outside sources, including the Film Fund, a New York City based non-profit. Grants comprised a nominal amount of the team's budget, and the film was largely funded by the filmmakers themselves. Jayne Loader stated in an interview, "Had we relied on grants, we would have starved." Pierce Rafferty helped to support the team and the film financially by working as a consultant and researcher on several other documentary films including the Oscar-nominated El Salvador: Another Vietnam, the Oscar-nominated With Babies and Banners, and The Life and Times of Rosie the Riveter (which also was inducted into the National Film Registry). The Rafferty brothers had also received an inheritance that they used to support the team during the five years it took to make the film. About 75% of the film is made up of government materials that were in the public domain. Though they could use those public domain materials for free, they had to make copies of the films at their own expense. This along with the newsreel and commercial stock footage that comprises the other 25% of the film (along with the music royalties) represents the bulk of the trio's expenditures.

== Release ==
The film was released on March 17, 1982, in New York, New York. In August 1982, a tie-in companion book of the same name, written by Kevin Rafferty, Jayne Loader and Pierce Rafferty was released by Bantam Books. A 4K digital restoration of the film, created by IndieCollect, premiered at SXSW in 2018.

=== Home media ===
The 20th Anniversary Edition of the film was released in DVD format in Region 1 on March 26, 2002, by Docudrama. A 4K restored version was released on Blu-ray on December 4, 2018, by Kino Lorber.

In 1995, Jayne Loader's Public Shelter, an educational CD-ROM and website – with clips from The Atomic Cafe, plus additional material from declassified films, audio, photographs, and text files that archive the history, technology, and culture of the Atomic Age – was released by EJL Productions, a company formed by Jayne Loader and her first husband, Eric Schwaab. Though it garnered positive national reviews and awards, the self-distributed Public Shelter CD-ROM sold only 500 copies and failed to find a national publisher. Loader and Schwaab divorced. The website folded in 1999.

== Reception and legacy ==
=== Critical response ===
When The Atomic Cafe was released, film critic Roger Ebert discussed the style and methods the filmmakers used, writing, "The makers of The Atomic Cafe sifted through thousands of feet of Army films, newsreels, government propaganda films and old television broadcasts to come up with the material in their film, which is presented without any narration, as a record of some of the ways in which the bomb entered American folklore. There are songs, speeches by politicians, and frightening documentary footage of guinea-pig American troops shielding themselves from an atomic blast and then exposing themselves to radiation neither they nor their officers understood." He also reviewed it with Gene Siskel who saw it more as a piece of Americana and a curiosity.

Critic Vincent Canby of the New York Times praised the film, calling the film "a devastating collage-film that examines official and unofficial United States attitudes toward the atomic age" and a film that "deserves national attention." Canby was so taken by The Atomic Cafe that he mentioned it in a subsequent article – comparing it, favorably, to the 1981 blockbuster Porky's.

Critic Glenn Erickson discussed the editorial message of the film's producers:

The makers of The Atomic Cafe clearly have a message to get across, and to achieve that goal they use the inherent absurdity of their source material in creative ways. But they're careful to make sure they leave them essentially untransformed. When we see Nixon and J. Edgar Hoover posing with a strip of microfilm, we know we're watching a newsreel. The content isn't cheated. Except in wrapup montages, narration from one source isn't used over another. When raw footage is available, candid moments are seen of speechmakers (including President Truman) when they don't know the cameras are rolling. Caught laughing incongruously before a solemn report on an atom threat, Truman comes off as callously flip ...

On Rotten Tomatoes the film has an approval rating of 93% based on reviews from 29 critics.

Deirdre Boyle, an Associate Professor and Academic Coordinator of the Graduate Certificate in Documentary Media Studies at The New School and an author of Subject to Change: Guerrilla Television Revisited, claimed that "By compiling propaganda or fictions denying 'nuclear-truth', The Atomic Cafe reveals the American public's lack of resistance to the fear generated by the government propaganda films and the misinformation they generated. Whether Americans of the time lacked the ability to resist or reject this misinformation about the atomic bomb is a debatable truth."

The Oxford Handbook of Science Fiction said it was, in quotes, a "mockumentary" from its editing and called it, "The most powerful satire of the official treatments of the atomic age".

=== Influences ===
In 2016, The Atomic Cafe was one of the 25 films selected for preservation in the annual United States' National Film Registry of the Library of Congress for being deemed "culturally, historically, or aesthetically significant". The press release for the Registry stated that "The influential film compilation 'Atomic Cafe' provocatively documents the post-World War II threat of nuclear war as depicted in a wide assortment of archival footage from the period ..."

Controversial documentary filmmaker Michael Moore was inspired by the film that he tweeted: "This is the movie that told me that a documentary about a deadly serious subject could be very funny. Then I asked the people who made it to teach me how to do it. They did. That movie became my first – 'Roger & Me'."

=== Accolades ===
Wins

- Boston Society of Film Critics: BSFC Award, Best Documentary; 1983.

Nomination

- British Academy Film Awards: Flaherty Documentary Award, Kevin Rafferty, Jayne Loader and Pierce Rafferty; 1983.

== Soundtrack ==
Atomic Cafe: Radioactive Rock 'n Roll, Blues, Country & Gospel

Soundtrack album
- Released: 1982
- Genres: Soundtrack, rock and roll, blues, country, gospel
- Length: 53:22
- Label: Rounder Records
- Producers: Charles Wolfe, The Archives Project (Jayne Loader, Kevin Rafferty and Pierce Rafferty)

Professional ratings
Review scores
Source	Rating
AllMusic	4.5/5 stars

Atomic Cafe: Radioactive Rock 'n Roll, Blues, Country & Gospel is the soundtrack to the 1982 film The Atomic Cafe. A vinyl LP record was released in 1982 by Rounder Records. Some of the credits for the record include: co-produced by Charles Wolfe, The Archives Project (Jayne Loader, Kevin Rafferty and Pierce Rafferty), album cover artwork by Dennis Pohl, cover design by Mel Green, and booklet text by Charles Wolfe.

=== Track listing ===
Side One
No.	Title	Author(s)	Date of recording	Length	
1	"Atom and Evil"	Golden Gate Quartet	November 1946	3:25	
2	Audio clip	Major Thomas Ferebee, Enola Gay bombardier	August 15, 1945	0:29	3:32
2	"When the Atom Bomb Fell"	Karl Davis and Harty Taylor	December 4, 1945	3:03	3:32
3	Audio clip	President Harry S. Truman	August 9, 1945	0:29	3:42
3	Audio clip	Captain Kermit Beahan, The Great Artiste bombardier	August 15, 1945	0:12	3:42
3	"Win the War Blues"	Sonny Boy Williamson I (Note: Blind John Davis played piano, Ted Summitt played guitar, and Armand "Jump" Jackson played drums.)	December 14, 1944	3:01	3:42
4	Audio clip	David E. Lilienthal, the first Chairman of the United States Atomic Energy Commission	October 28, 1946	0:22	3:14
4	"Atomic Power"	Buchanan Brothers	c. June 1946	2:52	3:14
5	Audio clip	Winston Churchill	March 31, 1949	0:25	3:51
5	Audio clip (Note: This audio clip is in the soundtrack, but not officially listed.)	News reporter	September 23, 1949	0:12	3:51
5	"Jesus Hits Like an Atom Bomb"	Lowell Blanchard and The Valley Trio (Note: Red Rector may have played the mandolin solo.)	c. April 1950	3:14	3:51
6	Audio clip	Rep. James E. Van Zandt (Republican), Penn.	May 8, 1953	0:47	3:40
6	"When They Drop the Atomic Bomb"	Jackie Doll and his Pickled Peppers	c. March 1951	2:53	3:40
7	"Atomic Sermon"	Billy Hughes and the Rhythm Buckaroos	c. 1953	3:05	
8	"Old Man Atom"	Sons of the Pioneers	c. 1947	3:43	
			Total length:	28:12	

Side Two
No.	Title	Author(s)	Date of recording	Length
1	"Uranium"	The Commodores (Note: Not to be confused with the soul music group Commodores.)	c. 1957	2:28
2	"50 Megatons"	Sonny Russell	c. 1956	2:26
3	"Atom Bomb Baby"	The Five Stars (Note: Ronnie Russell was the main singer, Jim Bruhn played the instrumentation.)	c. 1957	2:28
4	"Satellite Baby"	Skip Stanley	November 1957	2:55
5	"Sputniks and Mutniks"	Ray Anderson and the Homefolks	c. 1958	2:25
6	"Atomic Cocktail"	Slim Gaillard Quartette (Note: Zutty Singleton played the drums, Dodo Marmarosa played the piano, Tiny Brown played bass, and Gaillard played the guitar. Brown and Gaillard did the vocals.)	December 15, 1945	2:52
7	"Atomic Love"	Little Caesar with The Red Callender Sextette	c. 1957	3:22
8	"Atomic Telephone"	Spirit of Memphis Quartet (Note: Robert Reed, tenor, and Earl Malone, bass, sung. Jet Bledsoe and Sila Steele are lead singers.)	c. June 1951	3:04
9	"Red's Dream"	Louisiana Red (Note: Carl Lynch played bass, Panama Francis played the drums.)	1962	3:10
			Total length:	25:10

Featured in the film but not the soundtrack were "13 Women" by Bill Haley and His Comets, Glenn Miller's version of "Flying Home", a couple of themes from Miklos Rozsa, Arthur Fiedler's take on Franz Liszt's Hungarian Rhapsody No. 2, Charles Mackerras's interpretation of "The Old Castle" from Pictures at an Exhibition and Floyd Tillman's original 1948 version of "This Cold War with You" that was heard during the credits.

== See also ==
- Atomic Age
- Bruce Conner – experimental collage filmmaker that inspired the filmmakers similar in content
- Emile de Antonio – documentary filmmaker (which also inspired the co-directors) known for Point of Order, a 1964 study on Joseph McCarthy and the Army–McCarthy hearings
- Culture during the Cold War
- Duck and cover
- Fallout – the video game series featuring Atomic Age aesthetics
- How to Photograph an Atomic Bomb
- List of films about nuclear issues
- Nuclear weapons in popular culture
- Dr. Strangelove – the 1964 Stanley Kubrick classic to which critics compared The Atomic Cafe.
- Reefer Madness – the 1936 cult classic to which critics also compared it.
- United States in the 1950s
