= Collective (2019 film) =

2019 documentary film by Alexander Nanau

- Theatrical release poster
- Romanian: Colectiv
- Directed by: Alexander Nanau
- Written by: Alexander Nanau; Antoaneta Opriș
- Produced by: Alexander Nanau; Bianca Oana; Bernard Michaux; Hanka Kastelicová
- Cinematography: Alexander Nanau
- Edited by: Alexander Nanau; George Cragg; Dana Bunescu
- Music by: Kyan Bayani
- Production companies: Alexander Nanau Production; Samsa Film Luxembourg; HBO Europe; Mitteldeutscher Rundfunk; Radio Télévision Suisse; Radiotelevisione svizzera; YES Docu
- Distributed by: Bad Unicorn; HBO Europe; Magnolia Pictures; Dogwoof
- Release dates: September 4, 2019 (Venice); February 28, 2020 (Romania)
- Running time: 109 minutes
- Countries: Romania; Luxembourg; Germany
- Language: Romanian
- Box office: $147,875

Collective (Romanian: Colectiv, also known as Collective: Unravelling a Scandal) is a 2019 documentary film directed, written, produced, shot, and edited by Alexander Nanau. It centers on the 2016 public health scandal in Romania following the Colectiv nightclub fire. The film follows dual stories of investigative journalists at the Romanian newspaper Gazeta Sporturilor uncovering public healthcare corruption and maladministration, and the government's response to the crisis at the Ministry of Health.

The film had its world premiere at the Venice Film Festival on 4 September 2019, and was released in Romania on 28 February 2020, and on 20 November 2020 in other countries, including the UK and US. It received acclaim from critics, as well as many accolades, including from the European Film Awards and the National Society of Film Critics. At the 93rd Academy Awards, Collective was nominated in both the Best Documentary Feature and Best International Feature Film categories, becoming the first Romanian film to be nominated for an Academy Award.

== Plot ==
On October 30, 2015, in Bucharest, Romania, the metal band Goodbye to Gravity performs a concert at a club called Colectiv. Pyrotechnics cause a fire to break out that quickly engulfs the club, resulting in the immediate deaths of 27 people and the injury of 180 more. Over the following months, an additional 37 victims die, partially due to the lack of proper healthcare at public hospitals.

Journalists from Gazeta Sporturilor (The Sports Gazette) begin investigating the mismanagement of healthcare by public hospitals after sources inform them that the disinfectants used are diluted. Testing confirms this, and the journalists subsequently publish a hard-hitting story about the supplier, Hexi Pharma, and how it falsified documentation for the supplied disinfectants. The story also reveals that the government failed to properly verify the supplier and its products. The Minister of Health, Patriciu Achimaș-Cadariu, orders an investigation. When Cătălin Tolontan, a journalist from Gazeta, goes on TV to discuss the investigation, the Minister of Health dismisses the journalist's insistence for facts and evidence, stating that governmental testing shows the disinfectant solutions are 95 percent effective.

The journalists push further and find a source that confirms the intelligence service has known for years that bacterial infections were killing people, but did nothing. Gazeta publishes the story, and mass protests continue over the corruption and lack of proper healthcare protection. Consequently, the Minister of Health resigns, and a criminal investigation begins against the CEO of Hexi Pharma, Dan Condrea. The government announces at a press conference that they have tested the Hexi Pharma products and found the solutions were all diluted. Tolontan asks about the 95 percent effectiveness previously claimed by the Ministry of Health, and the Ministry responds by refusing to comment on their previous claim. Shortly after, Condrea is killed in a car crash.

Later, Gazeta obtains a video of a patient in a hospital with maggots festering in their wound. Their source, a frustrated doctor, explains that patient deaths resulting from diluted disinfectants or inadequate blood transfusion services continue unabated, even after the Social Democratic governmental ousting in late 2015. Vlad Voiculescu, the new Minister of Health, meets with the doctor, and she details how hospital management avoided the problems and did nothing while patients were dying. She also discusses how hospitals treat patients inhumanely, as well as how bribes are arranged between hospital managers and doctors.

Voiculescu concludes that there isn't a single unit throughout the public hospitals that isn't affected by profound administrative corruption. Learning that he cannot fire the corrupt hospital managers currently in place, many of whom bribed their way into their positions, he demands the introduction of extremely strict regulations for any new hospital managers. He begins to realize that the whole system is rotten, and that eradicating corruption would entail "firing everyone." When he withdraws funding from a lung transplant unit, deeming it dangerous, he becomes the target of a press campaign led by Mayor of Bucharest Gabriela Firea, who accuses him of wasting taxpayer money on transporting patients to Vienna, even though the unit in Bucharest is supposedly fully accredited to perform the same operation. A professor privately admits to Voiculescu that the unit should not have been accredited and only was due to political pressure, but begs Voiculescu not to speak about this in public to avoid a scandal that could ruin the reputation of the institute.

Election day arrives, and the Social Democrats sweep the election, obtaining the most votes. At Gazeta, Tolontan's colleague reveals she had an off-the-record conversation with someone who warns the journalists about their and their families' safety. Later on, the public hospital appoints a manager who is unqualified and legally unable to manage a hospital.

== Release ==
The film premiered out of competition at the 76th Venice Film Festival on 4 September 2019. It was also screened at the 2019 Toronto International Film Festival, and in the Spotlight section of the 2020 Sundance Film Festival.

Collective was released in Romania on 28 February 2020 by Bad Unicorn. On 20 November, it was released in the U.S. by Magnolia Pictures and Participant, and in the U.K. by Dogwoof.

== Reception ==
=== Critical response ===
On the review aggregator website Rotten Tomatoes, 99% of 134 critics' reviews of the film are positive, with an average rating of 9/10; the site's "critics consensus" reads: "Collective presents a darkly effective overview of the cycle of political corruption and public cynicism that takes hold when government abrogates its responsibility to the people." Metacritic assigned the film a weighted average score of 95 out of 100 based on reviews from 24 critics, indicating "universal acclaim".

Writing for the Los Angeles Times, Justin Chang called the film "a gripping, despairing exposé of institutional injustice". Jay Weissberg of Variety called it "a documentary for our times, deserving of widespread exposure". Manohla Dargis of The New York Times wrote that the film "sketches out an honest, affecting, somewhat old-fashioned utopian example of what it takes to make the world better, or at least a little less awful."

=== Accolades ===
At the 33rd European Film Awards, Collective won Best European Documentary, becoming the first ever Romanian film to achieve that feat. It also won Best Documentary at the 41st Boston Society of Film Critics Awards. Starting off the new year on a strong foot, the film won the prestigious Best Foreign Language Film Award from the National Society of Film Critics on 9 January 2021. On 26 January 2021, the National Board of Review selected the film as one of the top 5 foreign language films of the year. On 9 March 2021, the film was nominated for Best Documentary at the 74th BAFTA Film Awards. Furthermore, on 15 March 2021, Collective received nominations in two categories at the 93rd Academy Awards: Best Documentary Feature and Best International Feature Film; it is only the second film to be nominated for both awards, following North Macedonia's Honeyland the previous year, and is the first Romanian film to be nominated for an Academy Award in any category, let alone two. The film also won the prestigious Peabody Award.

Award	Date of ceremony	Category	Result	Ref
European Film Awards	12 December 2020	Best Documentary	Won	
Boston Society of Film Critics Awards	13 December 2020	Best Documentary Film	Won	
Los Angeles Film Critics Association Awards	20 December 2020	Best Documentary Film	Runner-up	
Chicago Film Critics Association Awards	21 December 2020	Best Foreign Language Film	Nominated	
Chicago Film Critics Association Awards	21 December 2020	Best Documentary	Nominated	
National Society of Film Critics	9 January 2021	Best Foreign Language Film	Won	
St. Louis Film Critics Association Awards 2020	18 January 2021	Best Documentary Feature	Won	
St. Louis Film Critics Association Awards 2020	18 January 2021	Best Foreign Language Film	Nominated	
Houston Film Critics Society	18 January 2021	Best Documentary Feature	Nominated	
San Francisco Bay Area Film Critics Circle	18 January 2021	Best Documentary Film	Won	
San Francisco Bay Area Film Critics Circle	18 January 2021	Best Foreign Language Film	Nominated	
Online Film Critics Society	25 January 2021	Best Documentary Film	Nominated	
Online Film Critics Society	25 January 2021	Best Foreign Language Film	Nominated	
National Board of Review	26 January 2021	Best Foreign Language Film	Nominated	
London Film Critics Circle	7 February 2021	Documentary of the Year	Won	
London Film Critics Circle	7 February 2021	Foreign Language Film of the Year	Nominated	
London Film Critics Circle	7 February 2021	Film of the Year	Nominated	
Toronto Film Critics Association	7 February 2021	Best Documentary Film	Won	
Washington D.C. Area Film Critics Association	8 February 2021	Best Documentary	Nominated	
Satellite Awards	15 February 2021	Best Documentary Film	Won	
Critics' Choice Awards	7 March 2021	Best Foreign Language Film	Nominated	
Austin Film Critics Association Awards	19 March 2021	Best Documentary	Nominated	
British Academy Film Awards	11 April 2021	Best Documentary	Nominated	
Independent Spirit Awards	22 April 2021	Best Documentary Feature	Nominated	
Academy Awards	25 April 2021	Best Documentary Feature	Nominated	
Academy Awards	25 April 2021	Best International Feature Film	Nominated	

== See also ==
- Romanian New Wave
- List of Romanian submissions for the Academy Award for Best International Feature Film
- List of submissions to the 93rd Academy Awards for Best International Feature Film
- Boston Society of Film Critics Award for Best Documentary Film
- European Film Award for Best Documentary
