= Kermit Beahan =

US Air Force officer

Kermit King Beahan
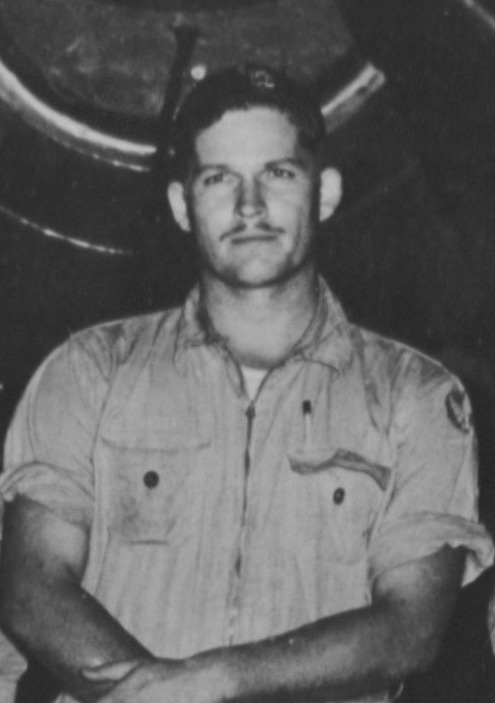
- Beahan in 1945
- Born: August 9, 1918; Joplin, Missouri, US
- Died: March 9, 1989 (aged 70); Clear Lake City, Texas, US
- Spouse: Tess Lavery
- Military career
- Allegiance: United States
- Branch: United States Air Force
- Service years: 1940–1964
- Rank: Lieutenant Colonel
- Nickname: the Great Artiste
- Unit: 509th Composite Group
- Awards: Distinguished Flying Cross with 1 Cluster; Air Medal with 7 clusters Purple Heart

Kermit King Beahan (August 9, 1918 – March 9, 1989) was a career officer in the United States Air Force and its predecessor United States Army Air Forces during World War II. He was the bombardier on the crew flying the Boeing B-29 Superfortress Bockscar on August 9, 1945 (his 27th birthday), that dropped the second atomic bomb on Nagasaki, Japan.

He also participated in the first atomic mission that bombed Hiroshima on August 6, 1945. Flying as part of the crew of The Great Artiste which was a reference to him, purportedly because he could "hit a pickle barrel with a bomb from 30,000 feet" or he was "good with the fairer sex," his aircraft acted as the blast instrumentation support aircraft for the mission.

Beahan attended Rice University on a football scholarship during the 1930s. He completed his B.S. degree in 1940. In July 1940, Beahan joined the Army Air Forces as an aviation cadet but washed out of pilot training, becoming a bombardier instead. He was assigned to the 97th Bombardment Group and took part in the first B-17 raids in Europe by Boeing B-17 Flying Fortresses. He flew 13 missions over Europe, 17 missions over North Africa, and five credited combat missions in the Pacific with the 509th Composite Group (including the Nagasaki sortie). He was shot down and crash-landed four times (twice in Europe and North Africa).

- September 7, 1942 - Airplane was damaged beyond repair by fighters and flak, barely managing to return to its home base with wounded and killed personnel aboard.
- October 2, 1942 - Airplane was severely damaged by flak and fighters, barely returning to friendly territory with severely wounded personnel aboard.
- Dec 18th, 1942 - Airplane was damaged by flak and continuous attack by fighters causing a crash landing near the front lines.
- Jan 29, 1942 - Airplane was damaged by flak and continuous attack by fighters wounding the pilot and co-pilot causing a crash landing in very rough terrain near the front lines.

He returned to the United States as a bombing instructor in Barksdale, Louisiana. In the summer of 1944, he was recruited by his former commander in England, Colonel Paul W. Tibbets to be part of the 509th Composite Group, which was formed to deliver the atomic bomb.

The mission to bomb Nagasaki was conducted on Beahan's 27th birthday. Admiral Frederick L. Ashworth, who participated on the mission as weaponeer, credited Beahan with saving the mission from failure by finding an opening in the clouds by which to complete the required visual bombing of the city. An estimated 35,000–40,000 people were killed outright by the bombing of Nagasaki.

Following the Japanese surrender, he returned to the United States as a crewman in the record-breaking 1945 Japan–Washington flight under Lieutenant General Barney M. Giles. He survived a crash of a B-25 at National Airport Aug 19, 1946. He remained in the Air Force until 1964, retiring as a lieutenant colonel. After his retirement, he worked as a technical writer for the engineering and construction firm Brown & Root through 1985.

In 1985, on the 40th anniversary of the Nagasaki bombing, Beahan said he would never apologize for the bombing, and that he had been thanked for his role by a group of 25 Japanese. He said the bombing was the "best way out of a hell of a mess." However in an interview with CBS News West 57th in 1988, he said "I would sincerely say I am sorry" when asked what he would say to a survivor of the bombing. Beahan hoped that he would forever remain the last man to have dropped an atomic bomb on people.

Beahan died of a heart attack in 1989. He was buried at the Houston National Cemetery. He was survived by his wife, the former Teresa Lavery of Belfast, Northern Ireland. Lavery had a previous marriage, from 1944–46, to Civil War historian Shelby Foote after having met when Foote's artillery unit was deployed to Northern Ireland. Foote had spent six years in the US military and was tasked with making preparations for the invasion of Japan but in spite of his desires, never saw combat. "Foote was devastated that World War II was over", and it was Beahan, the future husband of his ex-wife, who ended it.

== See also ==
- Thomas Ferebee
