= 1945 Japan–Washington flight =

Nonstop flight made by the USAAF after WW2

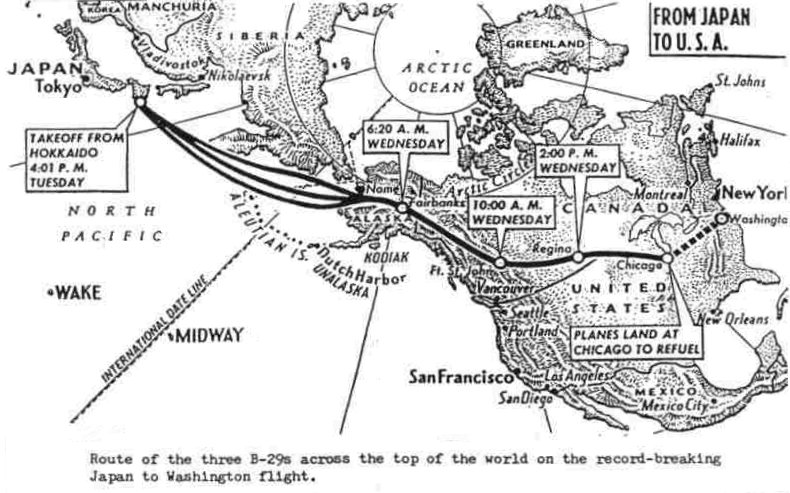
- An illustration of the flight path. The three bombers take parallel routes off the coast of Siberia, pass through Alaska, follow the Canadian west coast and then the U.S./Canada border before turning gradually towards Chicago. A dotted line marks the path from Chicago to Washington D.C.
- Date: September 18–19, 1945
- Location: Japan, United States
- Participants: Barney M. Giles; Emmett O'Donnell Jr. Curtis LeMay

The 1945 Japan–Washington flight was a record-breaking air voyage made by three modified Boeing B-29 Superfortresses on September 18–19, 1945, from the northern Japanese island of Hokkaidō nonstop to Chicago in the Midwestern United States, and then onward to Washington, D.C. The flight was made by three United States Army Air Forces (USAAF) generals and other airmen returning to the United States from their overseas duty after World War II. It set records for the heaviest load carried by an American aircraft (144,000 lb, 65,300 kg), the longest nonstop flight by the USAAF (5,840 mi, 9,400 km), and the first nonstop flight from Japan to the United States by a complete aircraft.

The airmen aimed to fly 6,500 miles (10,460 km) nonstop to Washington, D.C., but after they encountered unexpected headwinds over Alaska Territory and Canada, they concluded that two of the aircraft lacked enough fuel. Instead, all three B-29s landed in Chicago, refueled, and continued to Washington, where each crewman was awarded the Distinguished Flying Cross, including the three pilots: Generals Barney M. Giles, Emmett O'Donnell Jr. and Curtis LeMay.

The USAAF distance record was broken two months later, when another American aircrew flew a B-29 7,916 miles (12,740 km) from Guam to Washington, D.C., breaking the world distance record established by the Royal Air Force in 1938.

The Japan-to-Washington flight pioneered a route later used by airliners and demonstrated the reach of airpower during the nascent Cold War.

== Preparation ==
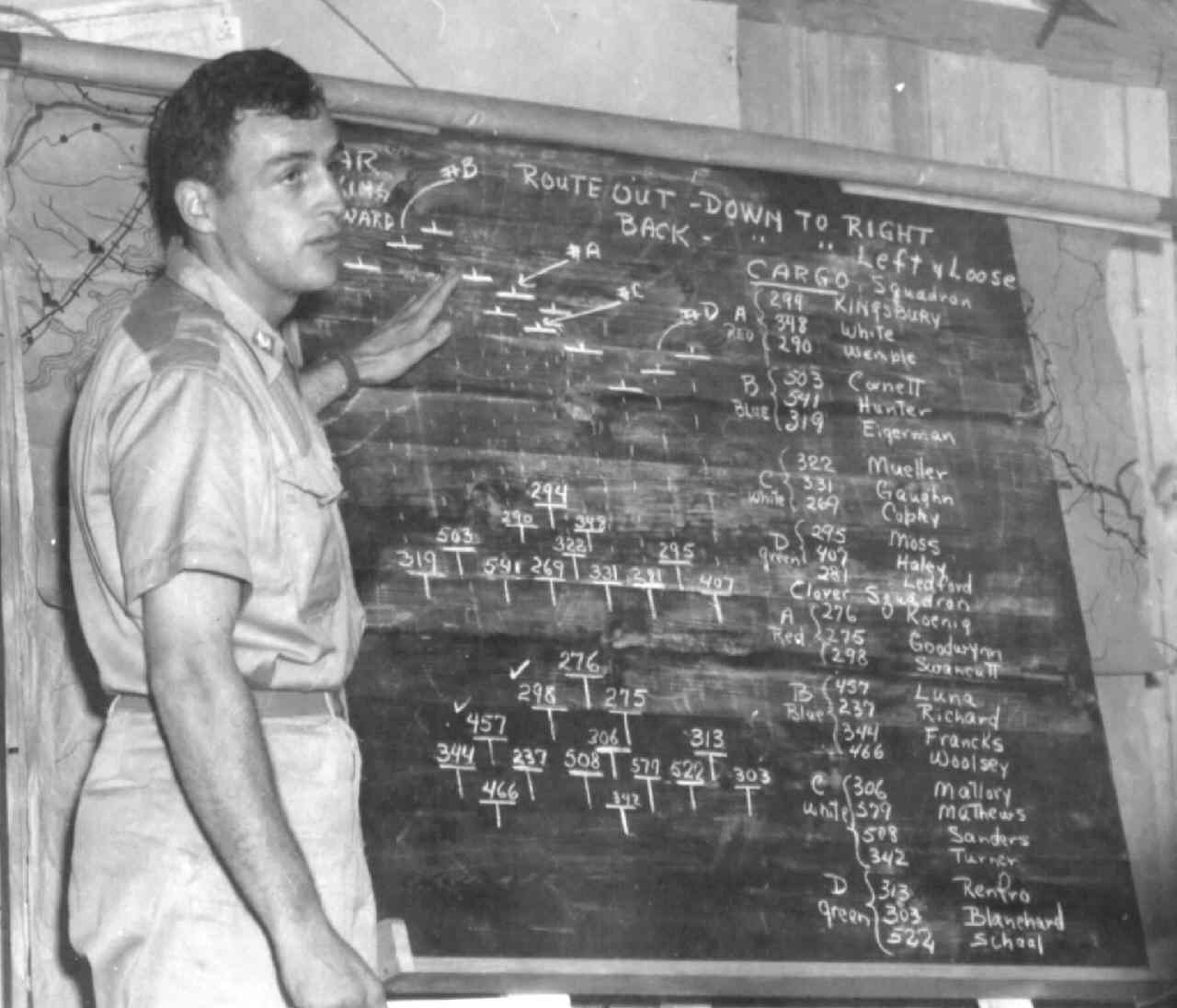
William "Butch" Blanchard pictured in China one year before the record-breaking flight.

Three B-29s based on Guam with spotless mission records and no mechanical difficulties, were selected for the mission. In a ten-day process that continued as a typhoon raged off Okinawa, the aircraft was stripped of unnecessary equipment such as armor and gun turrets, and the resulting empty spaces in the fuselage were faired over with smooth metal to minimize parasitic drag. Blister-type bubble windows were replaced with flat ones, painted group markings were removed, and the aluminum aircraft skin polished to a high luster, all in order to achieve the least possible drag. Twentieth Air Force markings were painted on each vertical rudder. The bomb bay in each aircraft was fitted with five 600-gallon (2,300 L) fuel tanks; added to the normal B-29 fuel tanks, this made a total of 10,000 gallons (38,000 L) of fuel capacity, as much as a railroad tank car. Filled with fuel and 12 men, each ship weighed 144,000 pounds (65,300 kg)—it would be the greatest overload attempted on a B-29 at that time. (B-29 tests under E.H. Rowley in June 1945 with Grand Slam bombs may have been run at similar loads, and the Martin PB2M was rated at 144,000 lb much earlier, as likely was the related JRM-1.)

When the aircraft were ready, they flew to Iwo Jima and stopped for the night. There they were loaded with as much fuel as they could hold. It was known that the intended air base in Hokkaidō did not have enough avgas to fill all three B-29s for the long-distance flight, meaning that at Hokkaidō they could only top off the fuel tanks to make up for the amount used to fly from Iwo Jima. On September 15, the three aircraft left Iwo Jima, flying north past Okinawa, where the typhoon had blown itself out. They continued to Hokkaidō where the approach involved some apprehension. The Japanese air base had been judged by Colonel William "Butch" Blanchard as suitable for B-29s, with a runway that was long enough and was near sea level for maximum lift in the densest possible air, but it was not known whether it could hold such heavily laden bombers without the concrete cracking. LeMay sent Douglas C-54 Skymasters filled with 55-gallon (210 L) drums of avgas to Sapporo—the crewmen would have to top off their tanks by hand. During an interview for the Your AAF fifth episode titled "blind landings" broadcast 20 September 1945, General Lemay was asked about the length of the airstrip. After telling the interviewer 8,200 feet, General Lemay was asked "Is that plenty of runway to get airborne with your load?", to which General Lemay replied "It's not plenty, but it's adequate." The Japanese air base that would serve as the launching point was called Mizutani at Chitose locally, and Sapporo Air Base by the Americans. Today it is the Japan Ground Self-Defense Force Camp Higashi-Chitose. It was built at the southern part of Japan's northern island Hokkaidō, near the city of Sapporo, as the base for long-range flights to attack the U.S.—one-way suicide trips made by four-engine bombers—a function that it never served. The three B-29s landed safely, and LeMay stepped from his aircraft to be greeted by approximately 30 Japanese soldiers and the base commander, who saluted for some time before realizing that LeMay had no intention of returning the salute. With that treatment setting the tone for U.S.–Japan relations in the area, the airmen made certain to wear side arms as they walked around downtown Sapporo on the evenings of September 16 and 17. LeMay later said that the 3,000 Japanese sailors manning the air base were "polite" and posed no threat.

== Aircraft and men ==
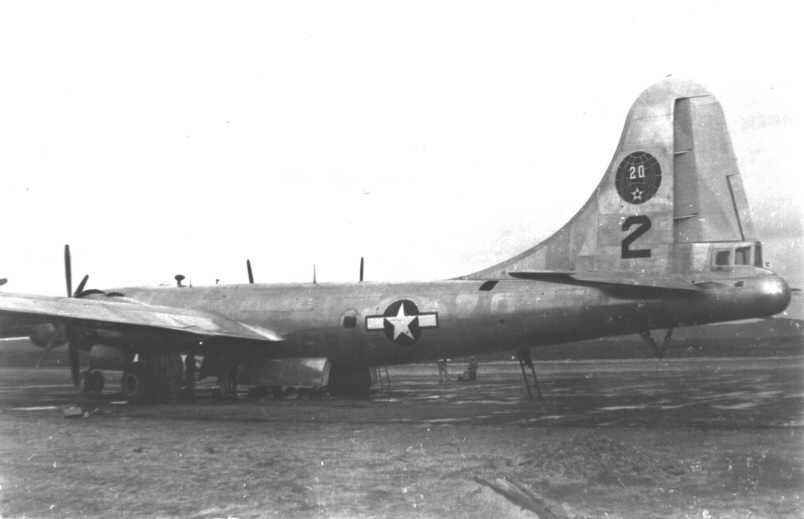
B-29 Number 2 at Sapporo Air Base. Gun turrets are absent, replaced by smooth fairings.

The commander of the first Superfortress was Lieutenant General Barney M. Giles, Deputy Commander of the United States Strategic Air Forces in the Pacific. His aircraft carried the only weather officer making the long-distance voyage. One of the crewmen was Captain Kermit Beahan, bombardier aboard Bockscar. Others included Lieutenant Bill Dolan, who served as one of the pilots.

The second aircraft's commander was Major General Curtis LeMay, Chief of Staff of the Strategic Air Forces. First Lieutenant J. Ivan Potts served as one of the pilots, as did Lieutenant Colonel William C. Kingsbury—the two had been a flight team in the 25th Bombardment Squadron (Very Heavy) of the 58th Bombardment Wing, Very Heavy, based on Tinian, and were good friends. Colonel William H. Blanchard, Chief of Staff of the Twentieth Air Force, joined the crew at Guam after personally inspecting Sapporo Air Base a few days earlier. Others on the crew from the 25th BS included Sergeant Jerome A. School, Sergeant Richard P. Fischer and Sergeant B. T. Freeman, the latter two removed at Guam when LeMay and Blanchard joined. Two men were from the 44th Bomber Squadron: First Lieutenant John C. Eiland and Staff Sergeant Frank Klas Jr. The remainder of the crew was Flight Engineer Captain William W. Townes (45th Bomber Squadron), First Lieutenant Stephen T. Jones (24th Bomber Squadron), Major John F. Wedding (468th Bomb Group) and Captain Theodore R. Finder (40th Bomb Group Headquarters). The crew chief was Master Sergeant Henry J. Rutowski.

Number 2 was construction number 44-70015, a B-29-75 built five months earlier in Wichita, Kansas, as part of the so-called Battle of Kansas—the push to produce great air fleets of B-29s. Number 2, dubbed Marianna Belle by its combat crew, made the cut because it did not consume more than the normal amount of fuel and oil in carrying out its missions, which were marked by top mechanical reliability.

Number 3 was commanded by Brigadier General Emmett O'Donnell Jr. who was ending his service as commander of the 73d Bombardment Wing, Very Heavy.

== Flight ==
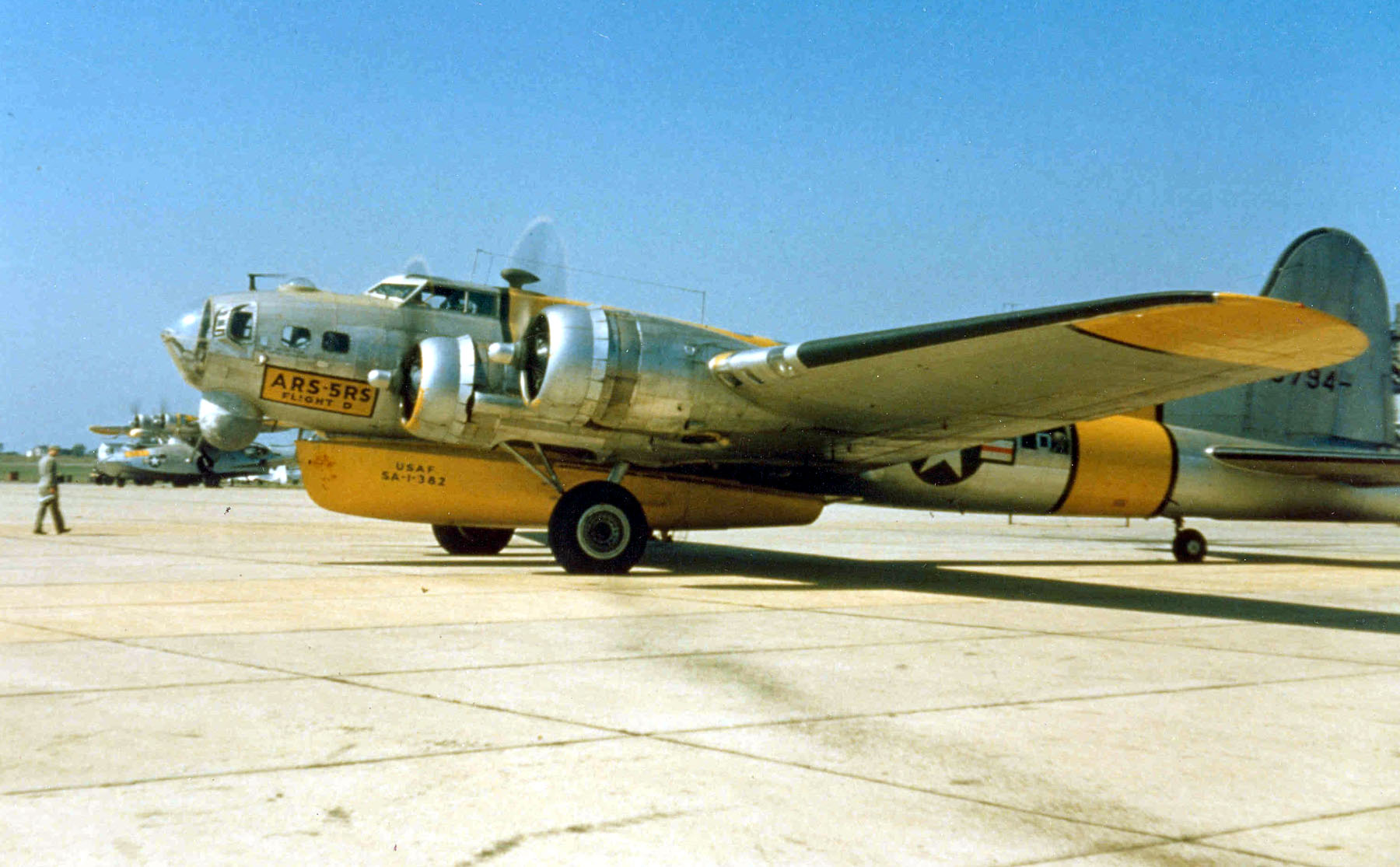
Dumbo rescue aircraft stood by on alert.

The airmen synthesized a "great circle" (shortest distance on the surface of a globe) flight plan that used the jet stream as a tailwind to help them get farther with less fuel, though the tailwind was not absolutely required. The plan was for each aircraft to make its own way over the Kamchatka Peninsula at the eastern edge of the Soviet Union, then over the Bering Sea to Nome, Alaska, and continue over Fairbanks, over the Canadian Rockies and much of Canada, over the Great Lakes, then on to Washington, D.C. near the Atlantic coast—a total of 6,762 miles (10,882 km) taking 26 hours in the air. This distance would not have broken the world's distance record then held by two Royal Air Force Vickers Wellesley aircraft that had flown from Ismaïlia, Egypt, to Darwin, Australia, in 1938, covering 7,162 miles (11,526 km), but it was considered a good public relations stunt, good for the USAAF and the generals' images.

On September 18, the airmen woke up very early to make final preparations. A weather observation aircraft took off an hour before the first B-29 to report the latest meteorological conditions along the path ahead. Dumbo and Super Dumbo aircraft (B-17s and B-29s rigged for air-sea rescue) stood by, on alert. With the airfield lit by truck headlamps, Number 1 commanded by Giles was first to take off, a little after 6:00 local time, as dawn began to glow in the east. Next, LeMay's ship took off at 6:15 am, 4:15 pm Eastern War Time in Washington, with Lieutenant Colonel Kingsbury at the throttles and First Lieutenant Potts at the controls. O'Donnell's Number 3 took off a few minutes later. The heavily loaded machines required every bit of the 8,200-foot (2,500 m) concrete runway to get airborne—and some of the gravel beyond—reaching 142 miles per hour (229 km/h) before lifting from the ground. All three bombers were expected to be in Washington by 5 pm the next day.

Two or three hours into the flight, the weather officer aboard Giles' Number 1 observed slight headwinds. Giles "threatened to throw him overboard unless he did something about it." Five hours out of Japan, the airmen in Number 2 were over Kamchatka when they were met by three Bell P-63 Kingcobra fighters wearing the red star insignia of the Soviet Air Force. The Soviet fighter pilots inspected the unarmed B-29 at close range and then performed aerobatic maneuvers for the Americans. The three dipped their wings in salute and left the Superfortress to continue its journey. After Kamchatka, LeMay and Blanchard replaced Kingsbury and Potts at the controls.

Over the Bering Sea, the three B-29s maintained radio contact with each other, communicating positions hourly as they navigated independently. Near the Arctic Circle, the magnetic compasses fluctuated wildly, and the fliers ignored them, relying instead on the radio compass. In Number 2, the radio compass stopped working as well, but it resumed working later in the flight.

Wearing fur-lined flight suits did not prevent the men from feeling the extreme cold of high altitude. Pilots rotated duty so that none would get too tired. Weather continued to be a great concern, and was frequently checked. The aircraft left the Bering Sea behind, encountering North America at Nome after about 13 hours of flight. From Nome to Fairbanks, the Northern Lights were clearly visible to the crews. Even though the B-29 pressurization systems were working, the outside air temperature of −25 °F (−32 °C) at an altitude of about 21,000 feet (6,400 m) was not counteracted by the heating systems "which seemed to have completely broken down."

=== Weather problems ===
At Fairbanks, the three B-29s encountered significant headwinds; more than the "slight" headwinds observed up to this time. They had expected tailwinds from the jet stream, yet could complete the distance without them, but headwinds meant that Washington might be too far. At 7 am Eastern War Time, aircraft Number 2 was over Northway, Alaska, and navigator Bill Townes determined that they were behind schedule. He said later, "When I reported that fact to General LeMay, he looked at me as if he thought it was my fault, so I retreated behind my bulkhead to check my figures." Later, the airmen learned that the typhoon near Okinawa the week before had greatly affected the jet stream.

Seventeen hours after lifting off at sunrise in Japan, the men began to see the sun rise again over the Yukon—it was a very short day for them, and none had been able to sleep for the excitement of the trip, the stimulant benzedrine, and the penetrating cold. Crossing into Canada, the headwinds grew stronger still, and a load of hard rime ice and clear ice was visible on the wings. Though the B-29s had been delivered to the war front complete with deicing equipment, such gear had been removed months before to reduce weight and therefore increase combat range and speed. The ice load picked up in the night would have to be endured until it melted off at lower altitudes.

Near Regina, Saskatchewan, the fliers made their first decision regarding early stops for fuel. One proposed solution was for Giles to land in Minneapolis, O'Donnell to land in Detroit, and LeMay (who had enough fuel) to continue as before to Washington. Giles radioed this plan to the War Department: "Have been bucking headwinds for past nine hours. Predicted plans for Fairbanks to States did not materialize. Giles and O'Donnell plan to land at Minneapolis and Detroit due to fuel. Plane Number Two, commanded by LeMay, believes he is able to get to Washington." However, soon after this, Giles determined that Chicago Municipal Airport was the only airport large enough to accommodate the B-29s; he directed O'Donnell to land there with him. LeMay sent word by radio to the War Department that he was heading for Washington. In New York, newspapers put this plan in headlines: "Two B-29s will land to refuel as third roars on to Capitol".

All three aircraft approached Chicago, and LeMay contacted the War Department again by radio. O'Donnell landed at 5:43 pm Eastern War Time, with Giles about 45 minutes behind. Just past Chicago LeMay was informed by the War Department that weather was "marginal" in Washington and that he was now ordered to refuel in Chicago. Giles landed at 6:30 and LeMay at 6:43 pm. LeMay's elapsed flight time was 27 hours and 28 minutes. The straight-line distance they had flown over the globe was about 5,840 miles (9,400 km).

While the aircraft were refueled, newspaper reporters asked questions of Giles and of Captain Kermit Beahan, who as bombardier aboard Bockscar, had visually targeted Nagasaki in order to drop the second atomic bomb. The other crewmen drank coffee and waited. When refueling was completed, they took off directly for Washington.

== Reception ==
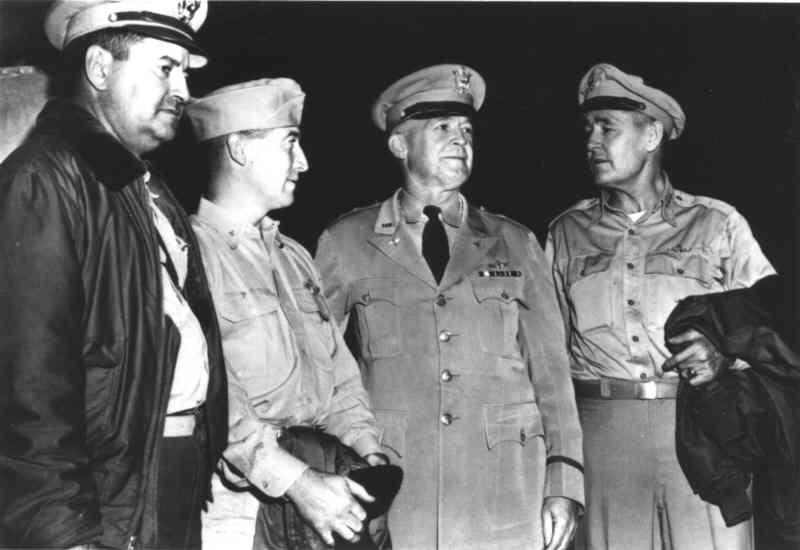
Greeted upon arrival in Washington: Curtis LeMay (far left), Emmett O'Donnell and Barney Giles (far right) pose with "Hap" Arnold (in tie).

From Chicago to Washington, D.C. the flight was uneventful. The "silvery sky giants, manned by their blue ribbon crews" flew over National Airport in formation at 9:30 pm and landed. The generals and crews stepped from their aircraft, LeMay waiting until he was smoking one of his signature cigars. Along with senior USAAF staff and reporters, wives and family were at the airport to greet the airmen, as well as a crowd of onlookers. Photographs were taken at the airport, then the airmen were whisked off to the Statler Hotel (which became the Capital Hilton). In the lobby, the weary, grimy and stubble-bearded men were besieged for autographs. Some of them stayed up later to hear supper-club singer Hildegarde in the grand showroom, others went to bed to catch up on sleep.

The next morning, a news conference was held in the grand showroom. Giles emphasized the importance of the route as an indication of the future, both for civil and military aircraft. He warned: "Now that we have proved that we can do it, we must now remember that any future enemy will also be able to do it". LeMay declared that he wanted a second chance to prove that the B-29 was capable of flying 6,500 miles nonstop. He said, "When we took off at Hokkaido we had a little headwind and expected it. However, all our information indicated that once we passed Fairbanks it would drop. We didn't need a tailwind. All we needed was a nice normal wind to arrive on schedule. The buffeting headwind averaged 70 mph" (110 km/h). After the reporters were finished, Giles presented all the airmen with the Distinguished Flying Cross. Giles told the men that each one could keep his personal military equipment as a memento of the flight, including parachutes. They were offered free rides home on military aircraft. Potts refused the parachute and the ride, telling Giles, "Thank you, general, I think I'll take the train!"

Other B-29 crewmen still in the Pacific Ocean theatre of World War II did not pay much attention to the record-breaking flight. Harry Changnon of the 40th Bomb Group on Tinian said "most of us in the 40th knew little about the trip in September 1945 as we were busy preparing to fly our 45 B-29s home in October". Two months later on November 19–20, Colonel Clarence S. Irvine and Lieutenant Colonel G. R. Stanley flew a long-distance testbed B-29 named Pacusan Dreamboat to a world's distance record of 7,916 miles (12,740 km) flying nonstop and unrefueled from Guam to Washington, D.C., taking 35 hours and 5 minutes. Their aircraft's gross weight was greater, at 155,000 pounds (70,000 kg).

== See also ==
- Flight distance record
