= Vlad Voiculescu =

Romanian politician

Vlad Voiculescu MEP
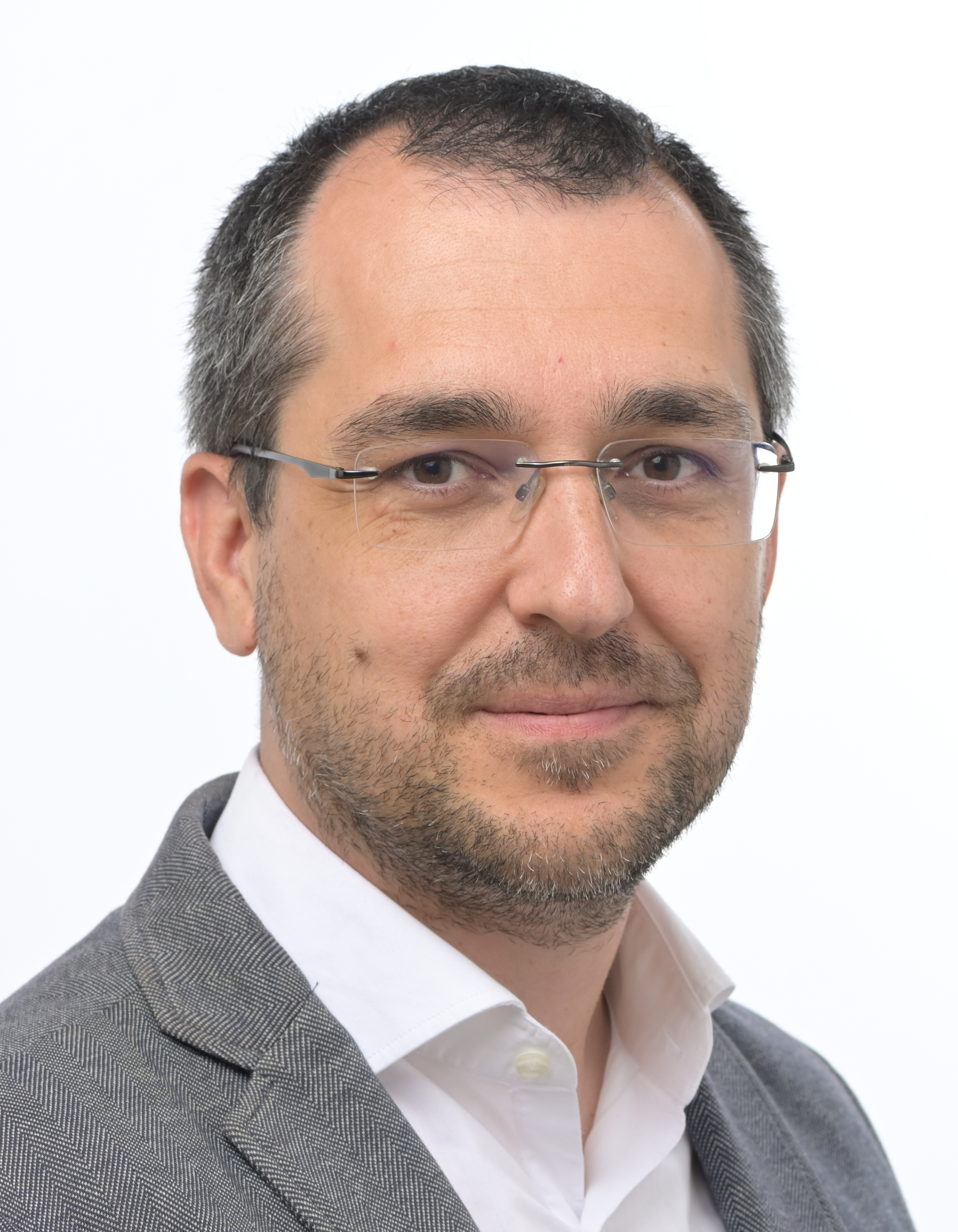
- Voiculescu in 2024

Minister of Health
- In office 23 December 2020 – 14 April 2021
- Prime Minister: Florin Cîțu
- Preceded by: Nelu Tătaru
- Succeeded by: Florin Cîțu (acting)
- In office 20 May 2016 – 4 January 2017
- Prime Minister: Dacian Cioloș
- Preceded by: Patriciu Achimaș-Cadariu
- Succeeded by: Florian-Dorel Bodog

Personal details
- Born: 6 September 1983 (age 42) Brănești, Dâmbovița County, Romania
- Party: PLUS (2018–2021); USR (2021–present)

Vlad Vasile Voiculescu (Romanian pronunciation: [vlad vaˈsile vojkuˈlesku]; born 6 September 1983) is a Romanian politician and former Romanian Minister of Health in the Cîțu Cabinet (affiliated with the Freedom, Unity and Solidarity Party, PLUS) whose term lasted from 23 December 2020 until he was revoked on 14 April 2021 by PNL Prime Minister Florin Cîțu. He formerly served in the same position in the Cioloș Cabinet between May 2016 and January 2017.

== Life and career ==
He was born in Brănești, Dâmbovița County. Voiculescu is known as one of the founders of Magicamp, along with the journalist Melania Medeleanu. Magicamp is a non-profit organisation that offers supportive therapies and financial aid to children diagnosed with cancer and their families. The donations consisted of materials whose value is over 3 million euros.

Voiculescu started the "Rețeaua Citostaticelor" (Cytostatics Network), an unofficial mechanism of supplying medications for patients diagnosed with cancer in Romania through parallel proceedings with official methods that are bureaucratic. Those organizations have been the subject of the Rețeaua (Network) documentary, by Claudiu Mitcu.

=== Politics ===
In 2018, Voiculescu co-founded the Mișcarea România Împreună ("Romania Together Movement") organization, a political movement founded by the ex-premier Dacian Cioloș. Vlad Voiculescu announced his candidacy in the subsequent 2020 elections for the city hall of Bucharest.

In December 2018, he became a member of the Freedom, Unity and Solidarity Party (PLUS). On 1 August 2019 he was designated by PLUS as a candidate for the Bucharest City Hall. On 28 February 2020 he withdrew his candidacy.

In December 2020, he was nominated to be part of the Cîțu Government as the Minister of Health. However, after a meeting between the Prime Minister of Romania Florin Cîțu and the Deputy Prime Minister of Romania Dan Barna, Voiculescu was removed from his position as Health Minister in 14 April 2021 due to all the scandals surrounding his mandate. Andreea Moldovan, the main Secretary of State of the Health Ministry, who often advised Voiculescu on measures was also removed. Voiculescu was shortly thereafter replaced by Florin Cîțu, the then-incumbent PM, as interim Health Minister.

== In popular culture ==
Voiculescu and his handling of the 2016 diluted disinfectants scandal are one of the main focuses of the 2019 documentary Collective.
