= Brănești, Dâmbovița =

Brănești
- Commune
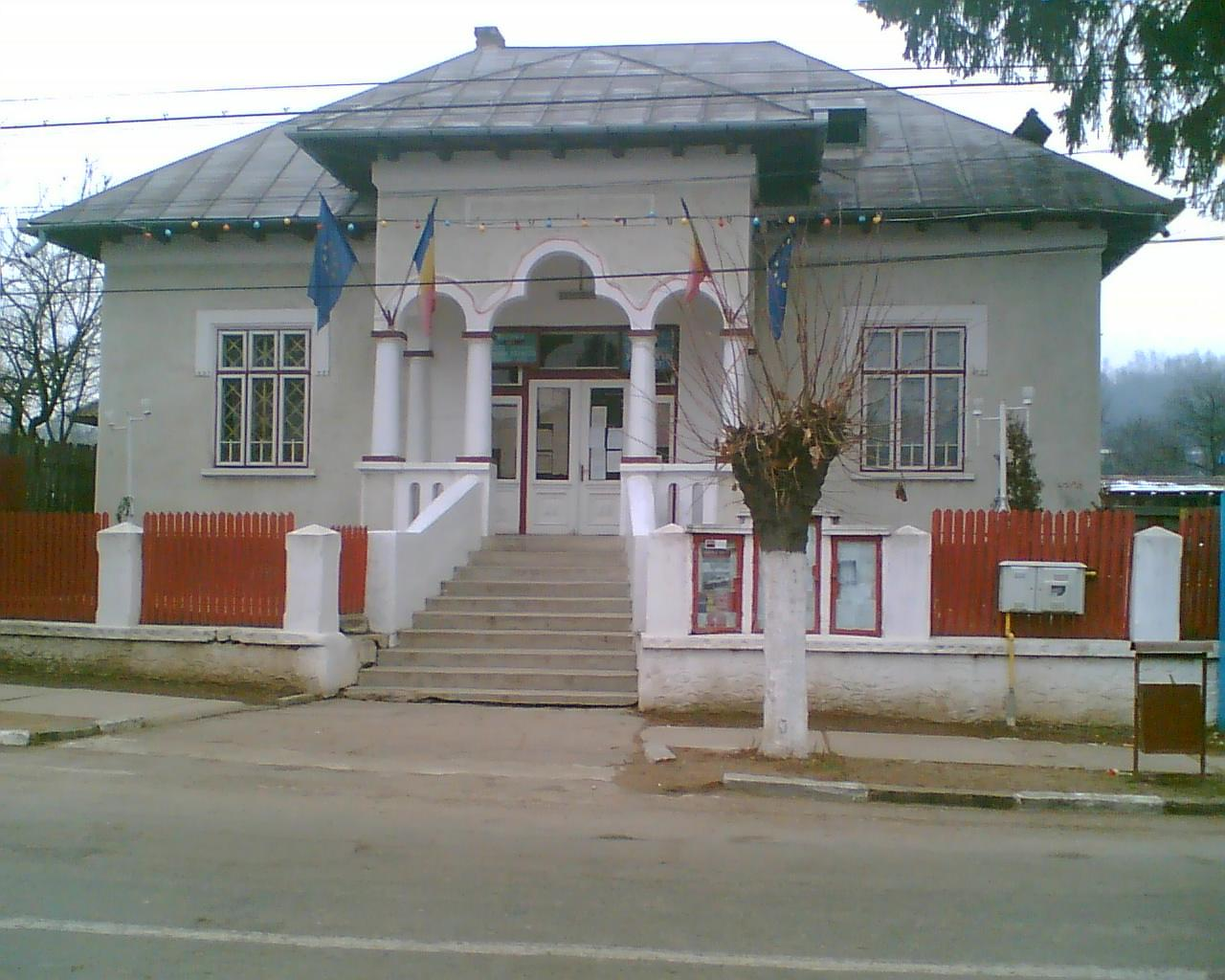
- Town hall

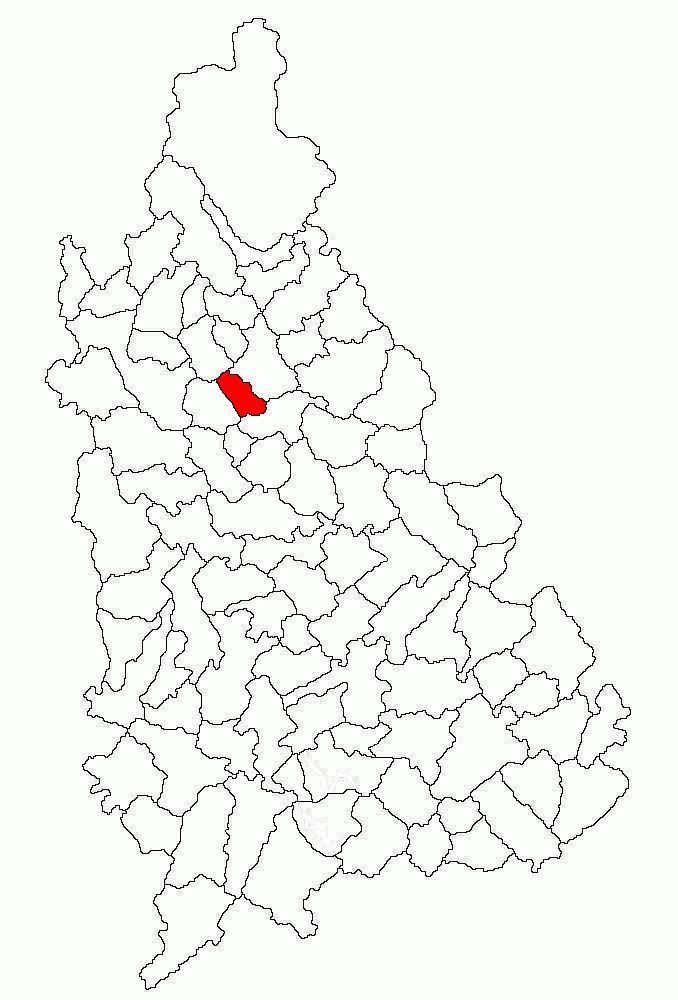
- Location in Dâmbovița County

- Location in Romania
- Coordinates: 45°2′30″N 25°25′10″E
- Country: Romania
- County: Dâmbovița

Government
  - Mayor (2020–2024): Daniel Neamțu (USR)
- Area: 17.95 km^{2} (6.93 sq mi)
- Elevation: 361 m (1,184 ft)
- Population (2021-12-01): 3,811
  - Density: 212.3/km^{2} (549.9/sq mi)
- Time zone: UTC+02:00 (EET)
  - Summer (DST): UTC+03:00 (EEST)
- Postal code: 137055
- Area code: +(40) 245
- Vehicle reg.: DB
- Website: branestidambovita.ro

Brănești is a commune in Dâmbovița County, Muntenia, southern Romania. It is composed of two villages, Brănești and Priboiu.

Historical population
Year	Pop.	±%
2002	4,286	—
2011	4,097	−4.4%
2021	3,811	−7.0%
Source: Census data

== Natives ==
- Vlad Voiculescu (born 1983), politician
