= Barney M. Giles =

United States Air Force general

Barney McKinney Giles
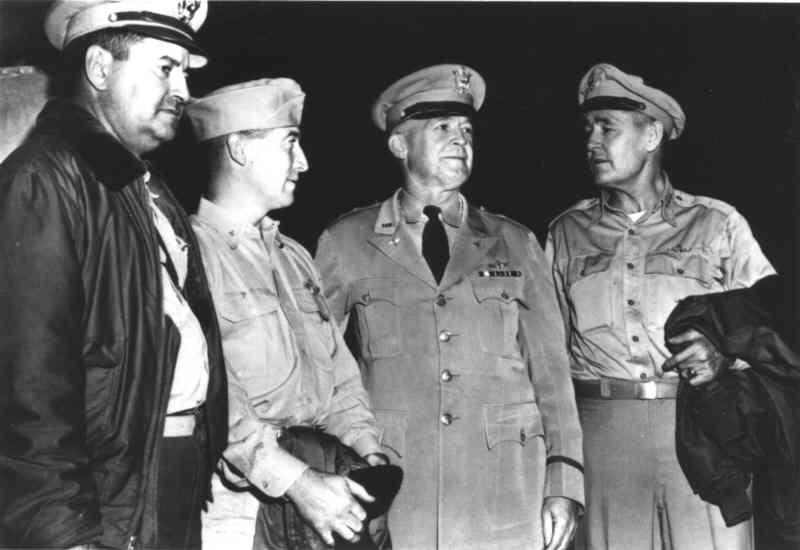
- Barney Giles (far right) with fellow air generals Curtis LeMay, Emmett O'Donnell and "Hap" Arnold (in tie)
- Born: September 13, 1892; Mineola, Texas, U.S.
- Died: May 6, 1984 (aged 91); San Antonio, Texas, U.S.
- Burial place: Fort Sam Houston National Cemetery
- Military career
- Allegiance: United States
- Branch: United States Army Air Service; US Army Air Corps; US Army Air Forces
- Service years: 1917–1946
- Rank: Lieutenant general
- Commands: Fourth Air Force; Twentieth Air Force
- Conflicts: World War I World War II
- Awards: Distinguished Service Medal (2); Distinguished Flying Cross; Air Medal (3); Navy Distinguished Service Medal; Knight Commander of the Order of the British Empire (UK); Order of the Cloud and Banner (ROC); Mexican Medal of Military Merit

Barney McKinney Giles (September 13, 1892 – May 6, 1984) was an American military officer who helped develop strategic bombing theory and practice. Giles stepped outside established bomber doctrine during World War II to develop long-range capabilities for fighter aircraft in use by the United States Army Air Forces. Giles served as commanding general of the Fourth Air Force then as commander of the Twentieth Air Force in the Pacific Ocean Areas. In 1945 Giles was appointed honorary Knight Commander of the Order of the British Empire by King George VI of the United Kingdom.

== Early career ==
Barney McKinney Giles was born on a farm near Mineola, Texas in 1892 to Richard Portlock Giles and Louisa (Read) Giles. He and his identical twin, Benjamin Franklin Giles, both attended East Texas Normal College and taught school for three years. Both twins studied law at the University of Texas at Austin until World War I began in Europe. Benjamin Giles went to Canada to see about joining the Royal Flying Corps, and then America became directly involved, allowing both brothers to join the United States Army Air Service, Benjamin as an officer candidate becoming second lieutenant in April 1917 and Barney as a flying cadet in August 1917. Giles attained the rank of second lieutenant in April 1918 and flew with the 168th Aero Squadron in France for a year. Giles resigned his commission in September 1919, Benjamin in October.

The twins returned to duty one year later: Benjamin in March 1920 and Barney in October 1920. Giles served as assistant engineering officer, first at the Aviation Repair Depot in Dallas, Texas, and eight months later at San Antonio Air Intermediate Depot. Giles became first lieutenant in April 1921, and remained at San Antonio until July 1924 when he transferred to Kelly Field as engineer and operations officer. Giles served as assistant chief at the Maintenance Branch in Fairfield, Ohio, from July 1925 until April 1927 and then as chief of the Maintenance Engineering Branch, Field Service Station at Wright Field from May 1927 until April 1928.

Lieutenant Giles spent the next year as assistant engineering officer and instructor in the Flying Department at March Field in California and in July 1929 became the post engineering officer at the same field. He served as chief engineering officer at Rockwell Air Depot in San Diego from October 1930 until July 1934, becoming captain in January 1932. Giles attended the Air Corps Tactical School at Maxwell Field in Alabama with his twin brother; The two Giles men graduated in June 1935 and both advanced to the rank of major. Other officers in the graduating class included strategic bombing advocates Haywood S. Hansell, Muir S. Fairchild, Vernon M. Guymon, Laurence S. Kuter, Lawson H. M. Sanderson and Hoyt S. Vandenberg.

Major Barney Giles commanded the 20th Bomb Squadron at Langley Field in Virginia for a year and moved up to operations officer of the 2d Bomb Group there in July 1936. He flew the first YB-17 Flying Fortress service test bomber to Langley on March 4, 1937. He was awarded the Distinguished Flying Cross for leading the rescue of seven men stranded on an ice floe near Cape Cod Bay. After graduation from the Command and General Staff School at Fort Leavenworth, Kansas in June 1938, he went to Washington, D.C. as chief of the Inspection Division in the Office of the Chief of Air Corps.

== World War II ==
Giles was promoted to lieutenant colonel in February 1941, to colonel in January 1942, and to brigadier general in March. In July, General Giles went to Hamilton Field just north of San Francisco where he organized and commanded the 4th Air Service Area Command. Giles received his second star in September 1942. He was named director of military requirements and assistant chief of air staff for operations in March 1943 and chief of Air Staff in July. Giles was appointed lieutenant general in May 1943 and in July was named deputy commander of the Army Air Forces. In this role, he often served as acting head of Army Air Forces because of General Arnold's prolonged illness. Giles actively promoted the development of long-range capabilities for fighter aircraft such as P-38 Lightnings, P-47 Thunderbolts and P-51 Mustangs. He went to the China-Burma-India Theater in mid-July and held a conference with commanders to arrive at some agreement on the allocation of tonnage over The Hump.

Giles was named commanding general of the Army Air Forces in the Pacific Ocean Area in April 1945 and was in charge of planning the final B-29 Superfortress air attacks against Japan, including plans for dropping the atomic bombs. At the death of President Franklin D. Roosevelt, Giles and other top military leaders briefed Harry S. Truman in the Oval Office the first morning of his presidency. In May, Giles went to Guam to join Major General Curtis LeMay in planning the strategy of bombing industrial and petroleum targets in Japan. Giles stated to the press that Japan's 148,000 square miles (383,000 km^{2}) would receive more bombs than Germany's 215,000 square miles (557,000 km^{2}). In June, Giles backed Admiral Charles A. Lockwood's plan to hold airman-submariner conferences with the goal of improving air-sea rescue operations. Giles was appointed deputy commander of United States Strategic Air Forces in the Pacific under General Carl Andrew Spaatz on July 5, 1945. Giles witnessed Japan's surrender aboard the battleship Missouri. In September 1945, Giles, LeMay and Brigadier General Emmett O'Donnell Jr. piloted three B-29s in a record-breaking non-stop flight from Japan over Alaska and Canada to Chicago, a flight of 5,839 mi (9,397 km), then on to Washington D.C. At that date it was the longest non-stop Army Air Forces flight, it was the first non-stop flight from Japan to the U.S., and the bomb bay filled with fuel was the heaviest load ever lifted by a B-29. In October, Giles became commanding general of the U.S. Strategic Air Forces in the Pacific; he held this position until his retirement on June 30, 1946.

Giles's twin brother Benjamin also served at high level in the Army Air Forces and retired from the military in September 1946 at the rank of major general.

== Honors ==
General Giles' awards and decorations include the Distinguished Service Medal with oak leaf cluster; Distinguished Flying Cross; Air Medal with two oak leaf clusters, and the Navy Distinguished Service Medal. He was appointed honorary Knight Commander of the Order of the British Empire in 1945. Giles earned a doctorate degree in aeronautical engineering from Pennsylvania Military College. Further awards include the Mexican Medal of Military Merit, the Honoris Causa from the Kingdom of Yugoslavia, and the Order of the Cloud and Banner presented by President Chiang Kai-shek of China.

== Civilian life ==
After retirement from the military, Giles served as vice president of Air Associates, Inc. in New York for three years. Subsequently, he worked for ten years with Swiss American Aviation Corporation, later known as Learjet, helping to develop the automatic pilot and other instrumentation. Giles was a member of the Order of Daedalians.

Giles married Hollyce Thomas (1896–1968) in San Antonio, Texas on April 18, 1922; the 46-year marriage produced no children. After her death in 1968, he married Laura Edwards in 1969. Giles's twin brother Benjamin died in 1974. Laura Edwards Giles died in the early 1970s, and Barney Giles married Katherine Elizabeth Gregg, on October 11, 1975. Giles died of complications of pneumonia on May 6, 1984, in San Antonio, and was buried with full military honors.
