= Jayne Loader =

American director and writer

Jayne Loader (born 1951) is an American director and writer best known for the 1982 Cold War documentary The Atomic Cafe.

== Early life ==
She was born in 1951 in Weatherford, Texas. She graduated from Reed College (B.A., 1973) and the University of Michigan (M.A., 1976).

== The Atomic Cafe ==
She co-directed The Atomic Cafe (1982) with Pierce Rafferty and Kevin Rafferty and has guested on many television shows, including Late Night With David Letterman. She is the author of Between Pictures (1986, ISBN 0-312-91345-1), a novel, Wild America (1989, ISBN 0-8021-1106-8), a collection of short stories, and articles on film and culture.

== Later years ==
In 1995, she created the CD-ROM and Website Public Shelter, which premiered in January 1996 at the New Media Center of the Sundance Film Festival and received two New Media INVISION Awards at Comdex.

From 1995 to 1997, she wrote WWWench, one of the first blogs and traveled the world as a New Media evangelist. In 1988, she debuted as a fictional character in Timothy Leary's What Does WoMan Want? In 1999, she married the astronomer Robert Kirshner. From 2001 to 2007, Loader and Kirshner were the Masters of Quincy House, one of Harvard's twelve undergraduate houses, where they lived with their bull terriers, Astra and Albert. During her tenure at Quincy, Loader renovated the Masters' Residence and Gym; helped to redesign the Dining Hall; gave many parties (assisted by the Quincy House Elves); and launched the controversial Masters' Nights speakers series. While serving on the Steering Group of the Resource Efficiency Program, Loader created the popular Valentine's Day Cosmetics Drive (2003–present), which survives her under the aegis of the Harvard Office for Sustainability.

She lives in Friendship, Maine and Pasadena, California.
