= HotNews =

Romanian news site

- Website type: News site
- Founder: Ioan Margarit
- Website: www.hotnews.ro
- Commercial: Yes

HotNews is one of the oldest and biggest Romanian news sites focused mainly on general topics, finance, politics, and current affairs. The website constantly publishes news, interviews, video documentaries, and opinion pieces.

== History ==
The website was founded in October 1999 by a group of financial journalists under the name RevistaPresei.ro and contained articles from outside sources put together as a press review. It was rebranded as HotNews.ro in 2005.

As of February 2019, the site has around 250,000–300,000 unique users daily, more than 3 million monthly unique visitors, and around 30 million monthly page views, according to stats measured by the Romanian BRAT/SATI.

Located in Bucharest, the company employed more than 30 journalists in 2018. Its advertising sales for 2007 stood between €600,000 and €700,000.

== See also ==
- Communications media in Romania
