= Libertatea =

Romanian broadsheet newspaper

- Type: Daily newspaper
- Format: General news
- Owner: Ringier
- Founded: 22 December 1989
- City: Bucharest
- Country: Romania
- Circulation: 192,467 (as of 2009)
- Website: www.libertatea.ro

Libertatea (Romanian pronunciation: [liberˈtate̯a]; "Freedom") is a Romanian daily newspaper and online news website covering current affairs, entertainment, sports and lifestyle. It was founded on 22 December 1989 (12:45 p.m.), by Octavian Andronic, as "the first independent newspaper of the Romanian Revolution of 1989".

== History and profile ==
The paper was started in 1989. The first edition was published at midday on 22 December 1989, being the first newspaper to announce that the communist ruler, President Nicolae Ceaușescu, had fled the capital in a helicopter. The former newspaper was named Informația Bucureștiului. Sorin Roșca Stănescu was a journalist at the former newspaper and worked with Octavian Andronic, the founder of the new newspaper Libertatea.

Nowadays, the first edition of Libertatea can be seen in museums, like Muzeul Presei Sever Bocu', from Jimbolia, Timiș County.

The current editor-in-chief, Dan Duca, joined Libertatea in March 2020 and was appointed editor-in-chief in August, the same year.

== Ringier takeover ==
In 1994, it was bought by Ringier and went through a lot of changes, which resulted in Libertatea eventually becoming the most printed and sold newspaper in the country, growing from Bucharest only into a national printed publication. It also became the first Romanian newspaper to be printed in color.

== Libertatea – tabloid ==
In 1999, most part of the newsroom leaves and starts another newspaper, Averea, Libertatea becomes a tabloid, following as a model the Swiss Ringier tabloid, Blick. The number of sold copies goes from some tens of thousands a day to more than 250,000.

In 2002, Libertatea was the most distributed newspaper in Romania, with a monthly average of 151,409 sold copies, per edition. Its competitors were Adevărul, with 129,389 sold copies, and Evenimentul Zilei, with 106,297.

The same year, Libertatea launches the Sunday edition.

A SNA study shows from July 2008 – July 2009, shows that Libertatea is still the number one newspaper in the country, with 1,425,000 readers. Its tabloid competitor, Cancan, is second, with 981,000 readers and the third is also a tabloid, Click, with 938,000 readers.

== Page 5 Girl ==
"Page 5 girl" (Fata de la Pagina 5) appeared when Libertatea relaunched as a tabloid and it soon became a brand on its own. Some national celebrities became famous due to being "Page 5" girls. Among them, the most known are Laura Cosoi, Andreea Mantea, Nicoleta Luciu and Roxana Ionescu.

In 2001, a night club, Pub 21, launched a cocktail with the name of "Fata de la Pagina 5".

After almost 20 years, in 2017, with a shift in editorial strategy, while rebranding as a popular newspaper, Libertatea cancels "Page 5 girl" section from its printed and online editions.

== From tabloid to general news ==
In 2014, Libertatea starts a rebranding process, by repositioning from tabloid to general news. The mix of content changes as well, shifting its accent from celebrities and content meant to shock and amaze, to general news, politics, features.

In 2016, BRAT (Biroul Român de Audit Transmedia), voted to move Libertatea from its "tabloid" category, to "General news", so the change became official.

Video also becomes an important part of the newsroom with a dedicated department.

== A new relaunch ==
In 2018, after Ringier Romania took over Gazeta Sporturilor in a joint venture with Sportal, Cătălin Tolontan became the editorial director of Libertatea. The newsroom goes through changes, new journalists become part of the team in a process that took place over two years.

Libertatea becomes well known for the investigative pieces, features and human stories published both in print and in the online edition.

== Circulation and format ==
Libertatea had a certified average daily circulation of 36,905 copies, in Q1 2020, with 11.732 subscriptions and 15.598 sold copies

The newspaper relaunched in April 2016, in general news format with a shift from tabloid journalism to more serious reporting, after a process which started in 2014. The decision was taken after a voting process in the directorial council of BRAT.

Libertatea is distributed Monday to Saturday, with daily content on its website. The Sunday edition was canceled starting April 2020. On Fridays, a free TV Guide is distributed with the printed edition. Also, both in print and online, readers can find, on Fridays, the weekly horoscope written by Urania.

== Online media ==
Libertatea publishes all news online, with free access both to current news and an archive of 670,000 stories. Libertatea.ro is ranked in the top 5 Romanian websites, as monthly number of unique users, according to BRAT.

Libertatea features a Monday to Friday online live news format, broadcast twice per day on "Adriana Nedelea, la fix". Uranissima, a video horoscope, by Urania, can be followed weekly on a dedicated playlist on the Libertatea YouTube channel.

Libertatea also hosts different opinion pieces and editorial comments daily in a dedicated section, Opinii.

== Awards ==
- "The most read newspaper" Radar de Media Awards (2011)
- Libertatea.ro "Best news online platform" – Radar de Media Awards (2015)
- Libertatea – "Best newsroom of 2019" – Premiile Superscrieri
- Libertatea – "Best investigative journalism of 2019", for the serial articles about fake doctors. Award offered by Superscrieri.
- Libertatea – FreeEX award (2019)

== Notable stories ==
1. At the beginning of 2019, Libertatea documents the oldest case of a missing child in Romania. The material, consisting of 2 parts [19], tells about Țiți, Cristescu Dumitru Laurențiu, a 4-year-old boy, who disappeared on 20 October 1973 in Bucharest, near a factory. Libertatea also talks about the robot portrait of an adult Ţiți, made by Florin Lăzău, the only Romanian policeman specialized in age progression.
2. "Ana de 1 Decembrie" is another case documented by Libertatea, about an 18-year-old young woman, named Ana Maria Tănasă, totally immobilized, with spastic tetraparesis, following an accident. Ana was trampled on the crosswalk by a car in Iași, in 2015, when she was paralyzed. When the article was published, prosecutors had not yet sent the perpetrator, Eugen Sandu, former head of the Iași Environmental Guard, to court. Three years after the accident, Libertatea journalists visit the only eyewitness of the accident, Iulian Dumitru, settled in England. The witness admits to the journalists that they are the first to come to visit him. On 28 December 2018, almost a month after the publication of the material from Libertatea, the prosecutors from Iași sent Eugen Sandu, the perpetrator of the accident, to court and suspended his right to drive the car.
3. In July 2018, Libertatea publishes an exclusive investigation about Cristi Borcea, former shareholder and executive president of the Dinamo Bucharest club. The material, consisting of two parts, talks about how Cristi got rich, during his detention in the Poarta Albă Penitentiary, following the sale of liquefied petroleum gas, LPG, to various state institutions, including the Penitentiary where he was imprisoned. Among the state clients are the General Directorate of Social Assistance and Child Protection Călărași, the Romanian Post and the National Railway Company "CFR" SA.
4. The story of the plastic skate rink, from Carol Park, in Bucharest, is investigated by Libertatea in December 2018. The article lists and analyzes the contracts of the company that won the auction for the installation of the rink, a contract worth 80,000 Euros. The newspaper states that the company, Star Pro Center INTL, is promoted using photos with ice rinks that are sold on the Chinese trade site Alibaba.
5. "Front Journal of Afghanistan" is a series of reports and videos published in February 2018, made by Dragoș Sasu and Ionuț Iordăchescu. The two Libertatea journalists broadcast, for 2 weeks, from the war zone in Afghanistan.
6. Libertatea published a material about false advertising in its own newspaper, in the press, on TV and on the Internet. The report refers to the advertisement of a recommended supplement in oncological diseases, which contains a banned substance in the United States. Following the report, the newspaper's customers who promoted such supplements withdrew. Libertatea won a FreeEx award for this piece.
7. On Monday 15 October 2018, Libertatea published the story of a 13-year-old girl from Onești who was sexually assaulted by her father. Then, continues a series of investigations and reports, which show that in Romania there are many cases in which pedophiles were found guilty and received sentences with suspension, or without execution.
8. On Tuesday 5 February 2019, Libertatea published the case of the fake doctor Matthew Mode, real name Matteo Politi, who operated in several private clinics in Romania for a year without having specialized studies. The news is taken over by the main television stations in Romania, but also by The New York Times, which, under the signature of Palko Karasz, presents in detail the case of Matteo Politi, citing Libertatea. For this series about fake doctors, Libertatea won an award for "Best investigative journalism of 2019".
