= Thomas Ferebee =

United States Air Force officer (1918–2000)

Thomas Wilson Ferebee
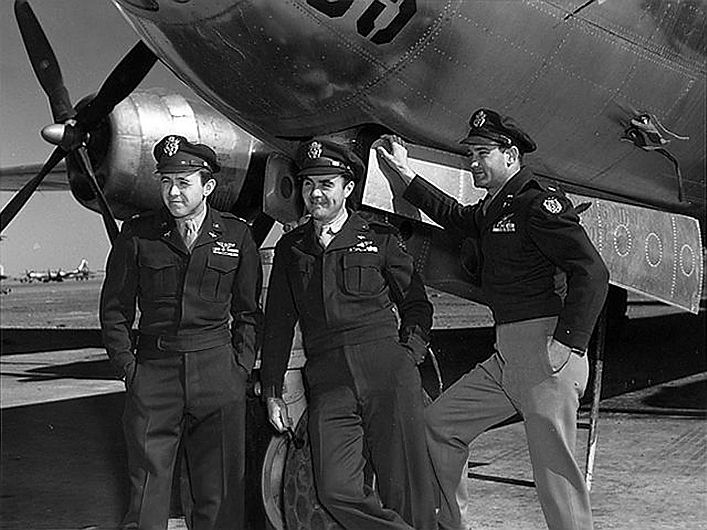
- Van Kirk, Tibbets, and Thomas Ferebee (right)
- Born: November 9, 1918; Mocksville, North Carolina, U.S.
- Died: March 16, 2000 (aged 81); Windermere, Florida, U.S.
- Military career
- Allegiance: United States
- Branch: United States Air Force
- Service years: 1942–1970
- Rank: Colonel
- Unit: 509th Composite Group
- Conflicts: World War II; Vietnam War
- Awards: Silver Star; Air Medal

Colonel Thomas Wilson Ferebee (November 9, 1918 – March 16, 2000) was a United States Air Force officer who served in World War II and the Vietnam War. He was the bombardier aboard the B-29 Superfortress, Enola Gay, which dropped the atomic bomb "Little Boy" on Hiroshima in 1945.

== Biography ==
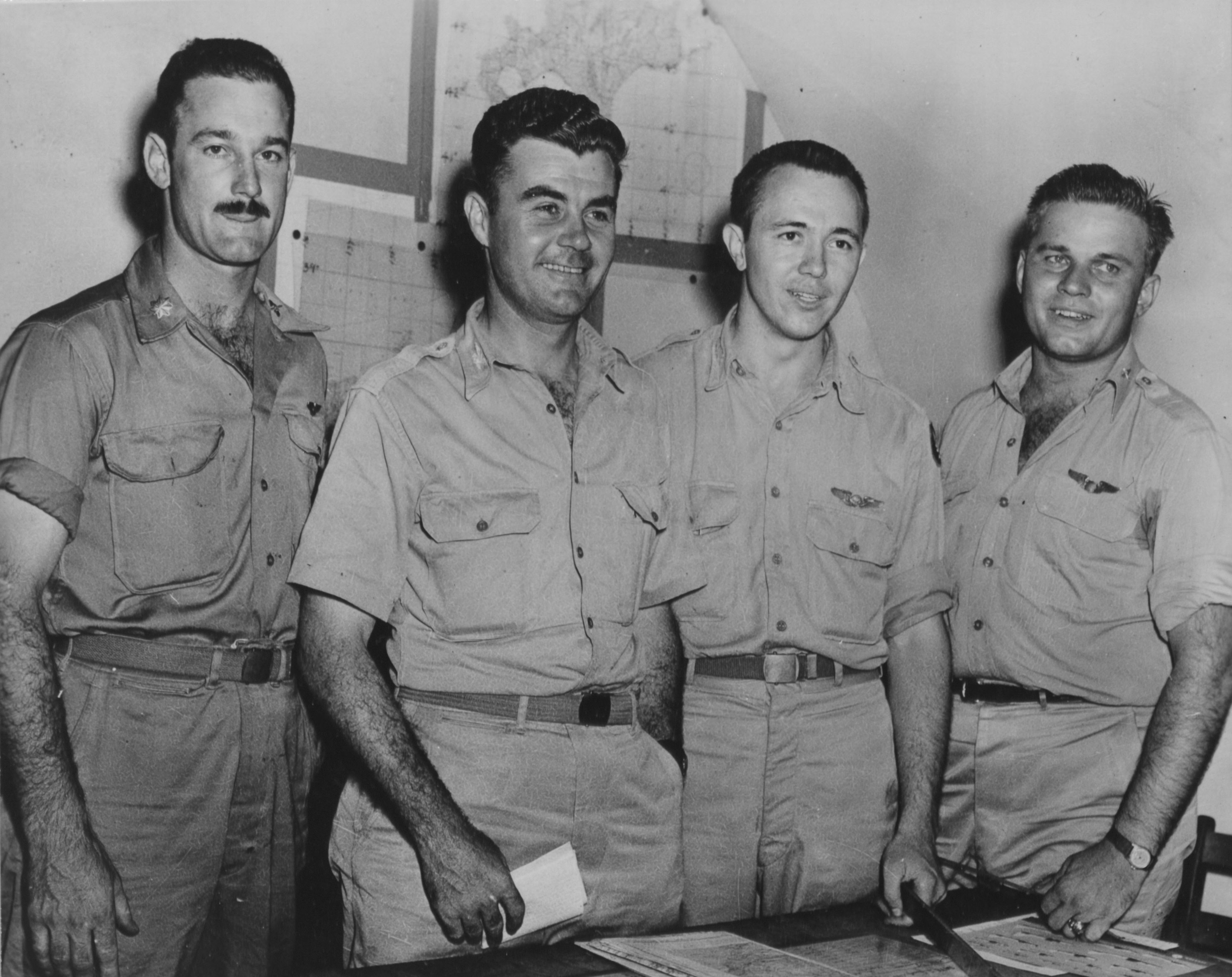
Left to right: Major Thomas W. Ferebee, Bombardier; Col. Paul W. Tibbets, Jr. Pilot; Capt. Theodore J. Van Kirk, Navigator; and Captain Robert Lewis.

Thomas Wilson Ferebee was born on a farm outside Mocksville, North Carolina, as the third of eleven children raised in a Methodist family. In 1935, at age 17, he attended Lees-McRae College in Banner Elk, NC. Talented in athletics since childhood, he earned awards in track, basketball, and football. After training for a small position with the Boston Red Sox and not making the team, he joined the Army. A knee injury kept him from service in the infantry but he was accepted into flight training. After two years of flight school, Ferebee was assigned as a bombardier in the European theater, completing more than 60 bombing missions. In the summer of 1944, he was recruited by Colonel Paul Tibbets to be part of the 509th Composite Group which was formed to drop the atomic bomb.

Like Tibbets, Ferebee remained in the military in the years after World War II as the U.S. Army Air Forces became the U.S. Air Force. Ferebee spent most of his USAF career in the Strategic Air Command, serving during the Cold War and in Vietnam. He retired from the U.S. Air Force in December 1970 at McCoy AFB, Florida, as a master navigator (bombardier) with the rank of colonel. He then worked as a real estate agent in and around Orlando, Florida. Like Tibbets, Ferebee never expressed regret for his role in the bombing, saying "it was a job that had to be done."

He died at his home in Windermere, Florida, at the age of 81. He was survived by his wife, Mary Ann Ferebee, who donated his collection of military documents and objects to the North Carolina Museum of History in Raleigh.

Following Thomas Ferebee's death, singer-songwriter Rod MacDonald wrote "The Man Who Dropped The Bomb On Hiroshima," a song directly quoting him from an interview MacDonald did for Newsweek's "Where Are They Now" feature in July 1970. The song, on his 2002 album Recognition, remembers Ferebee as referring to "the one big thing" he'd done, noting he'd visited Japan after the war and, after seeing "planes all tooled for suicide attacks, I left there thinking we'd made that war end sooner." He adds, "Someday when I meet my maker, I'll know then if my one big thing was right."

== See also ==
- Atomic bombings of Hiroshima and Nagasaki
- Robert A. Lewis
- Kermit Beahan
- Kyūjō incident
- Surrender of Japan

== Bibliography ==
- Fletcher Knebel and Charles W. Bailey II (1960), No High Ground, New York: Harper and Row, ISBN 0-313-24221-6.
- Gordon Thomas and Max Morgan Witts (1977), Enola Gay, 1978 reprint, New York: Pocket Books, ISBN 0-671-81499-0.
