= Emmett O'Donnell Jr. =

United States Air Force general (1906–1971)

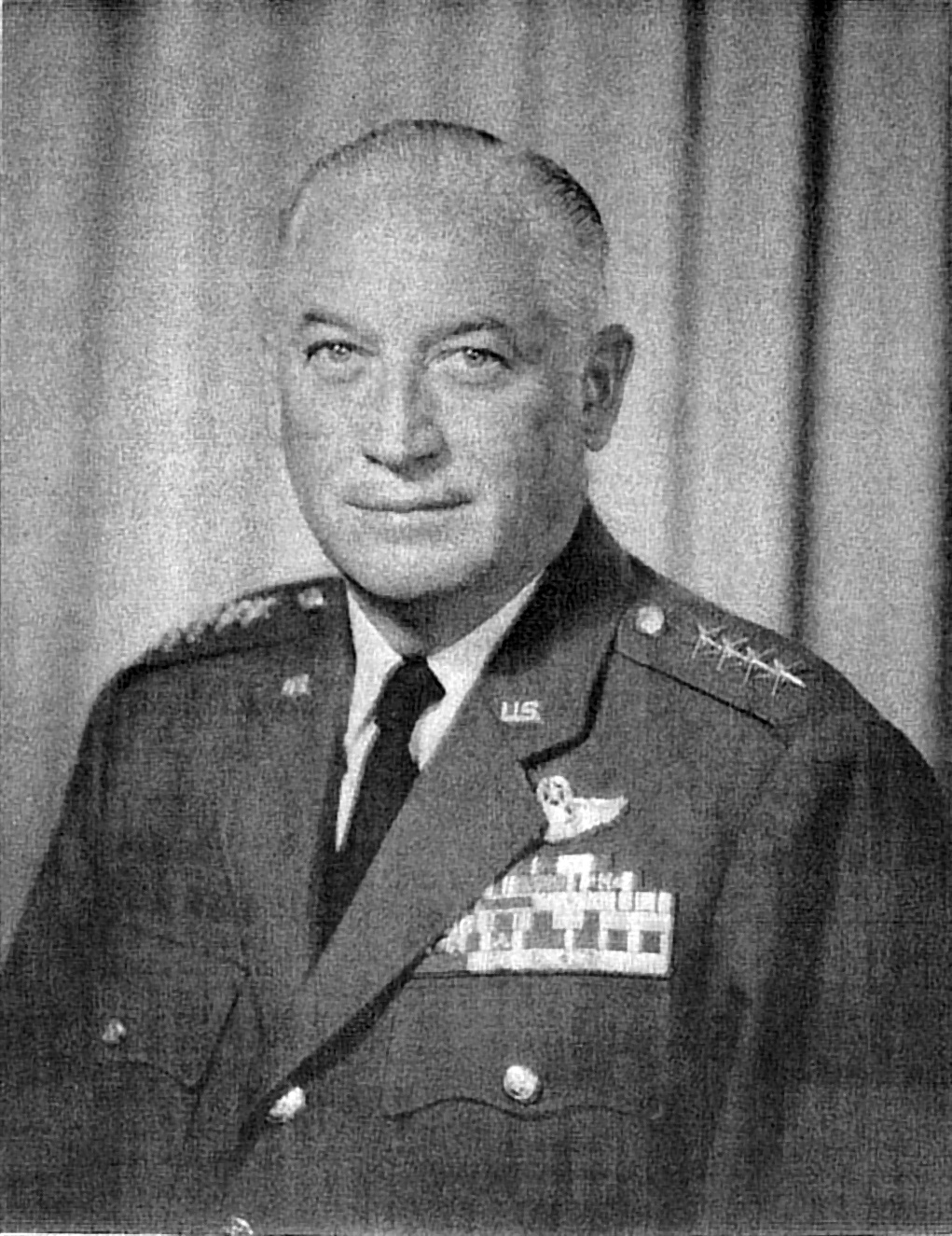
- General Emmett "Rosie" O'Donnell Jr. in a 1962 portrait
- Born: September 15, 1906; Brooklyn, New York, US
- Died: December 26, 1971 (aged 65); McLean, Virginia, US
- Military career
- Allegiance: United States
- Branch: United States Air Force
- Service years: 1928–1963
- Rank: General
- Nickname: Rosie
- Commands: Pacific Air Forces; 15th Air Force
- Conflicts: World War II; Korean War
- Awards: Distinguished Service Cross; Silver Star; Legion of Merit; Distinguished Flying Cross (4); Air Medal (2)

General Emmett E. "Rosie" O'Donnell Jr. (September 15, 1906 – December 26, 1971) was a United States Air Force four-star general who served as Commander in Chief, Pacific Air Forces (CINCPACAF) from 1959 to 1963. He also led the first B-29 Superfortress attack against Tokyo during World War II.

== Biography ==
=== Early career ===
At West Point in 1928

O'Donnell was born in Brooklyn, New York, in 1906. He graduated from Manual Training High School in 1924 where he was a member of Omega Gamma Delta fraternity and from the United States Military Academy four years later. Excelling on the academy's football team, he played substitute halfback for All-Americans Harry Wilson and Chris "Red" Cagle at West Point. O'Donnell was also a member of the academy's lacrosse team. He graduated from the academy in 1928.

Appointed a second lieutenant of Infantry, he received flying training at Brooks Field and Kelly Field, Texas, earning his wings by March 1930. His initial flying assignment in the Air Corps was a six and one half year tour with the 1st Pursuit Group at Selfridge Field, Michigan. During this time O'Donnell also served as an airmail pilot with the Army Air Corps mail operations at Cleveland, Ohio, in the spring of 1934.

O'Donnell became a captain April 20, 1935. In December, 1936, Captain O'Donnell was assigned to the 18th Reconnaissance Group at Mitchel Field, New York, until 1940. While with this organization, he attended the Air Corps Tactical School at Maxwell Field, Alabama, graduating in August 1939. He was also assistant football coach at West Point from 1934 to 1938. Transferred to Hawaii in February 1940, he was assigned as a squadron commander of the 11th Bombardment Group.

O'Donnell became a major in January 1941. As Japanese designs in Southeast Asia became apparent in the fall of 1941, the Army Air Forces sent air reinforcements to General Douglas MacArthur. Major O'Donnell and his 14th Bombardment Squadron set out from Hickam Field to the Philippines via Midway, Wake, New Guinea and Australia September 5. A week later all nine of the B-17s landed at Clark Field, Manila. This was the first mass flight of land planes to cross the western Pacific from Hawaii to the Philippines.

=== World War II ===
After Pearl Harbor, O'Donnell's group fought in the air and later with the Infantry until they were forced to withdraw to Bataan and then to Mindanao. Major O'Donnell and some of his group later moved to Java. Before the war in the Pacific was two days old, O'Donnell had earned the Distinguished Flying Cross. He left Clark Field during an enemy attack and flew to Vigan where he attacked a heavy cruiser and its destroyer escort. Due to faulty bomb releases he made five runs over the target, evading anti-aircraft fire and enemy fighters.

From January 1942, when he arrived in Java, until the beginning of March, when the Japanese conquered the island, he served as operations officer of the Far East Air Force. He then evacuated to India, where he became assistant chief of staff for operations of the newly organized Tenth Air Force. O'Donnell became a lieutenant colonel in January 1942 and a colonel the following March.

He returned home in 1943 as chief of General Arnold's Advisory Council, a post he retained until he was appointed commanding general of the 73d Bomb Wing at Smoky Hill Army Airfield in Salina, Kansas a year later. O'Donnell became a brigadier general in February 1944. He trained the B-29 Superfortress Wing for six months at Smoky Hill and then led it to Saipan. The B-29s began the campaign against the Japanese homeland on November 24, 1944, when O'Donnell led 111 B-29s against industrial targets in Tokyo. Only 88 of the planes were able to bomb, and results were poor, partly because of bad weather. This was the first attack on Tokyo since the Doolittle Raid in April 1942.

=== Post-war ===
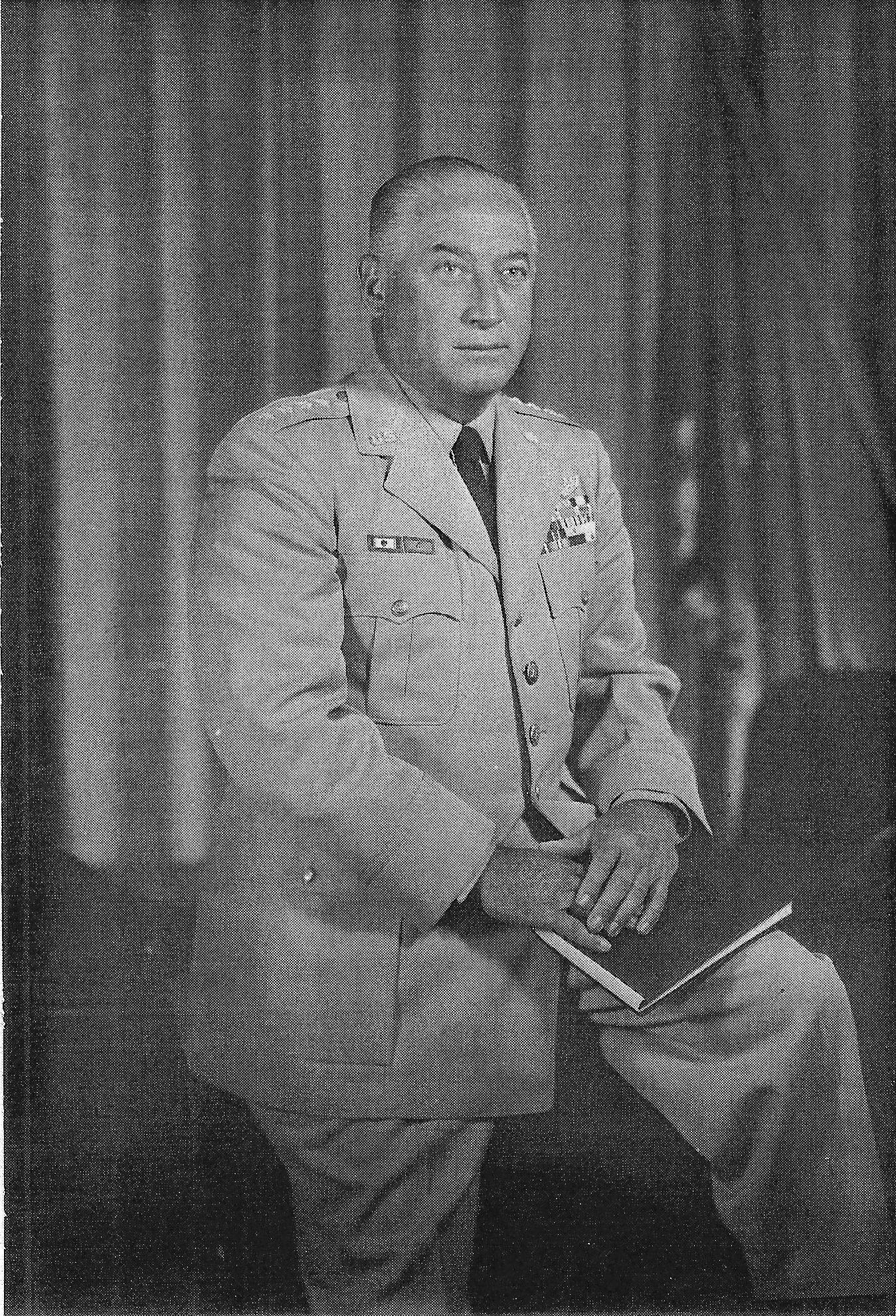
1959 portrait

In September 1945, O'Donnell piloted one of three specially modified B-29s on the first nonstop flight from Japan to the U.S., breaking several USAAF records, including takeoff weight and length of flight. The aircraft, all piloted by generals, used up too much fuel fighting unexpected headwinds, and they could not fly to Washington, D.C., the original goal. They decided to land at Chicago and refuel, then continue to Washington, where they all received Distinguished Flying Crosses.

After the war O'Donnell was assigned to the Air Technical Service Command (later Air Materiel Command) Headquarters at Wright Field where he served as deputy chief of the Engineering Division. He remained there until August 1946 when he was made director of information of the Army Air Force. O'Donnell was promoted to major general in February 1947.

In September 1947, after the U.S. Air Force headquarters was established, he was designated deputy director of public relations. In January 1948 he was appointed steering and coordinating member of the military representation on the Permanent Joint Board on Defense, Canada-United States; the Canada-United States Military Cooperation Committee; the Joint Mexico-United States Defense Commission; and the Joint Brazil-United States Defense Commission.

=== Korean War ===
O'Donnell became commanding general of the 15th Air Force at Colorado Springs, Colorado, in October 1948, and in November 1949 moved with that headquarters to March Air Force Base, California. Early in 1950, as a result of United Nations action against communist forces in Korea, General O'Donnell took a nucleus of his 15th Air Force staff for the Far East to Japan. Here he would organize and command the Far East Bomber Command with headquarters in Japan. His first B-29 units to arrive in Japan carried out a maximum bombing effort in Korea 36 hours after the first B-29 had arrived in Japan.

As North Korean troops moved steadily down Korea, outnumbered American troops retreated south. General Walton Walker decided to build a perimeter defense to shelter Pusan, the key port. As the Eighth United States Army built up its defenses, Communist troops massed across the Naktong River for a thrust at Taegu, less than 100 miles north of Pusan. To lessen this threat, O'Donnell led 98 B-29s on a bombing mission near Waegwan. During this period of temporary duty he retained command of the 15th Air Force with its headquarters at March Air Force Base.

=== Retirement ===
O'Donnell returned to the United States in January 1951. O'Donnell was unanimously elected Commissioner of baseball on August 21, 1951, to succeed Happy Chandler. He never served in the position, however, as President Harry Truman refused to release him from active duty as the United States was engaged in the Korean War at the time. Two years later he was appointed deputy chief of personnel at Air Force headquarters in Washington and promoted to lieutenant general, remaining in this position until August 1959. That month he was appointed commander in chief, Pacific Air Forces, Hickam Air Force Base, Hawaii and promoted to full general. He retired from the Air Force on July 31, 1963. Two months later, President Kennedy awarded O'Donnell the Distinguished Service Medal for long and distinguished service to his country.

O'Donnell became president of the USO in 1964. He died from cardiac arrest at his home in McLean, Virginia on December 26, 1971. O'Donnell was interred at the United States Air Force Academy Cemetery on December 30, 1971.

== Distinguished Service Cross citation ==

O'Donnell Jr., Emmett.
Major General, U.S Air Force
Bomber Command, Far East Air Forces
Date of Action: 13 July 1950 to 16 September 1950

Citation:

The President of the United States of America, under the provisions of the Act of Congress approved July 9, 1918, takes pleasure in presenting the Distinguished Service Cross (Air Force) to Major General Emmett O'Donnell Jr., United States Air Force, for extraordinary heroism in connection with military operations against an armed enemy of the United Nations while serving as Commanding General, Bomber Command, Far East Air Forces (Provisional), in action against enemy forces in the Republic of Korea from 13 July to 16 September 1950, during three important combat missions over enemy targets. On 13 July 1950, General O'Donnell led and directed the strike of fifty-two aircraft which dropped four hundred and forty-nine tons of explosives on railroad yards and shop installations at Wonsan, resulting in the complete destruction of railroad repair facilities in that area. On 16 August 1950, he led and directed ninety-eight aircraft in a maximum effort strike during which eight hundred and forty-six tons of explosives were dropped on reported enemy materiel and troop concentrations in the Waegwan area, breaking up enemy preparations for an attack in that sector. On 16 September 1950, General O'Donnell led and directed an eighty aircraft strike which dropped six hundred tons of bombs on targets in the Pyongyang area, causing extensive damage to oil refineries, warehouses, and a steam power plant. During these strikes, his aircraft was subject to attack by enemy aircraft and ground anti-aircraft fire, and he was in danger of death or capture by the enemy. His exemplary action in constantly risking his life while personally leading his flight, although in a position where such duty was not required of him, was a source of inspiration for other members of his command, reflecting great credit on himself and the military service.

== Awards and decorations ==
His awards include:

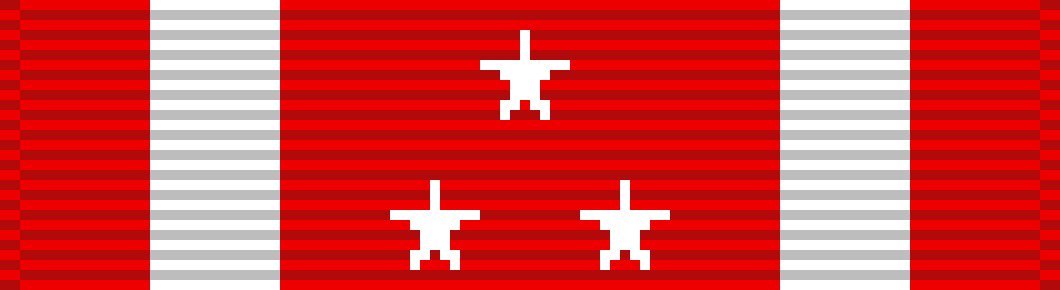

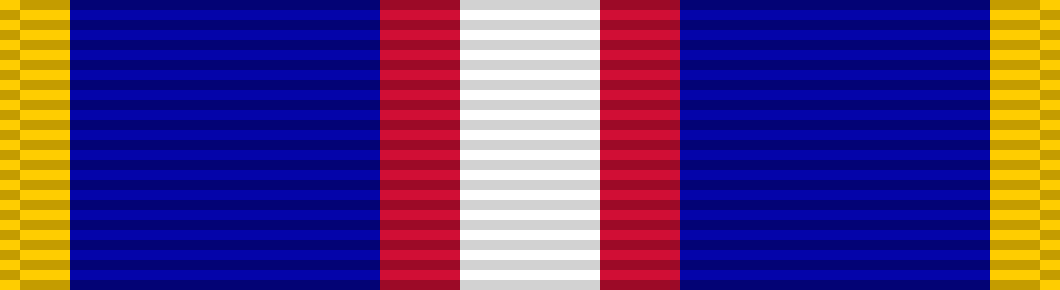

Badge	Command Pilot Badge		
	Distinguished Service Cross		Air Force Distinguished Service Medal
1st row	Army Distinguished Service Medal	Silver Star	Legion of Merit
2nd row	Distinguished Flying Cross with 3 Oak leaf clusters	Air Medal with 1 Oak leaf cluster	Presidential Unit Citation with 1 Oak leaf cluster
3rd row	American Defense Service Medal with 'Foreign Service' clasp	American Campaign Medal	Asiatic-Pacific Campaign Medal with 6 Campaign stars
4th row	World War II Victory Medal	Army of Occupation Medal with 'Japan' clasp	National Defense Service Medal with 1 Service star
5th row	Korean Service Medal with 1 Campaign star	Air Force Longevity Service Ribbon with 9 Oak leaf clusters	Philippine Defense Medal
6th row	Philippine Liberation Medal	Philippine Independence Medal	Korean Presidential Unit Citation
7th row	United Nations Service Medal Korea	Korean War Service Medal	Inter-American Defense Board Medal

Foreign Awards

Order of the Bath Honorary Companion	Order of Military Merit Taeguk Medal with Silver Star
