= 2016 diluted disinfectants crisis in Romania =

Healthcare scandal in Romania

The diluted disinfectants crisis in Romania of 2016 characterized a critical time in the evolution of the national health system, arose as a result of researching nonconformities in relation to legal rules, parameters of products disinfectants purchased and used in medical institutions in Romania.

In the spring of 2016, the press revealed that the Romanian health system was widely using diluted disinfectants bought from Hexi Pharma, which had been involved in a similar scandal back in 2006.

== Background and preliminary ==
After some of the victims of Colectiv nightclub fire died in nosocomial infections, the subject came to the attention of the press. Although their incidence was reported to be low and declining, it was already known that those reports were false, and actual results were if anything artificially increased by unnecessary admissions of people who were suffering from diseases that require hospitalization.

However, for years, there were indications that some disinfectants used in hospitals did not meet the standards required. Thus, the activity report of the Directorate of Public Health Bucharest recorded having been notified by the Public Health Department of Arad that the latter had found a non-conforming product, Polyiodine Scrub, produced by Hexi Pharma. Thor, another product made by Hexi Pharma, had been tested in France in laboratories of a competitor, ANIOS, which found a different recipe to the one indicated. It also showed significant dilution had taken place; however the information was not made public at the time. The same disinfectant, Thor, had been identified since 2006 as responsible for infecting newborns in a maternity hospital in Argeș County. The result was a series of criminal complaints against the manufacturer: Farma University, which has since changed its name to Hexi Pharma.

== Reactions ==
On 6 May 2016, around five hundred people protested in Bucharest, amid a severe sub financing of the health system in a country where thousands of Romanian specialists emigrate annually, and bribery and informal payments are practices endemic in hospitals nationwide.

On 8 May 2016, amid the scandal, Health Minister Patriciu Achimaș-Cadariu resigned. Prime Minister Dacian Cioloș assumed the interim until the appointment of his successor, Vlad Voiculescu, on 20 May 2016.
