= New Zealand music festivals =

Overview

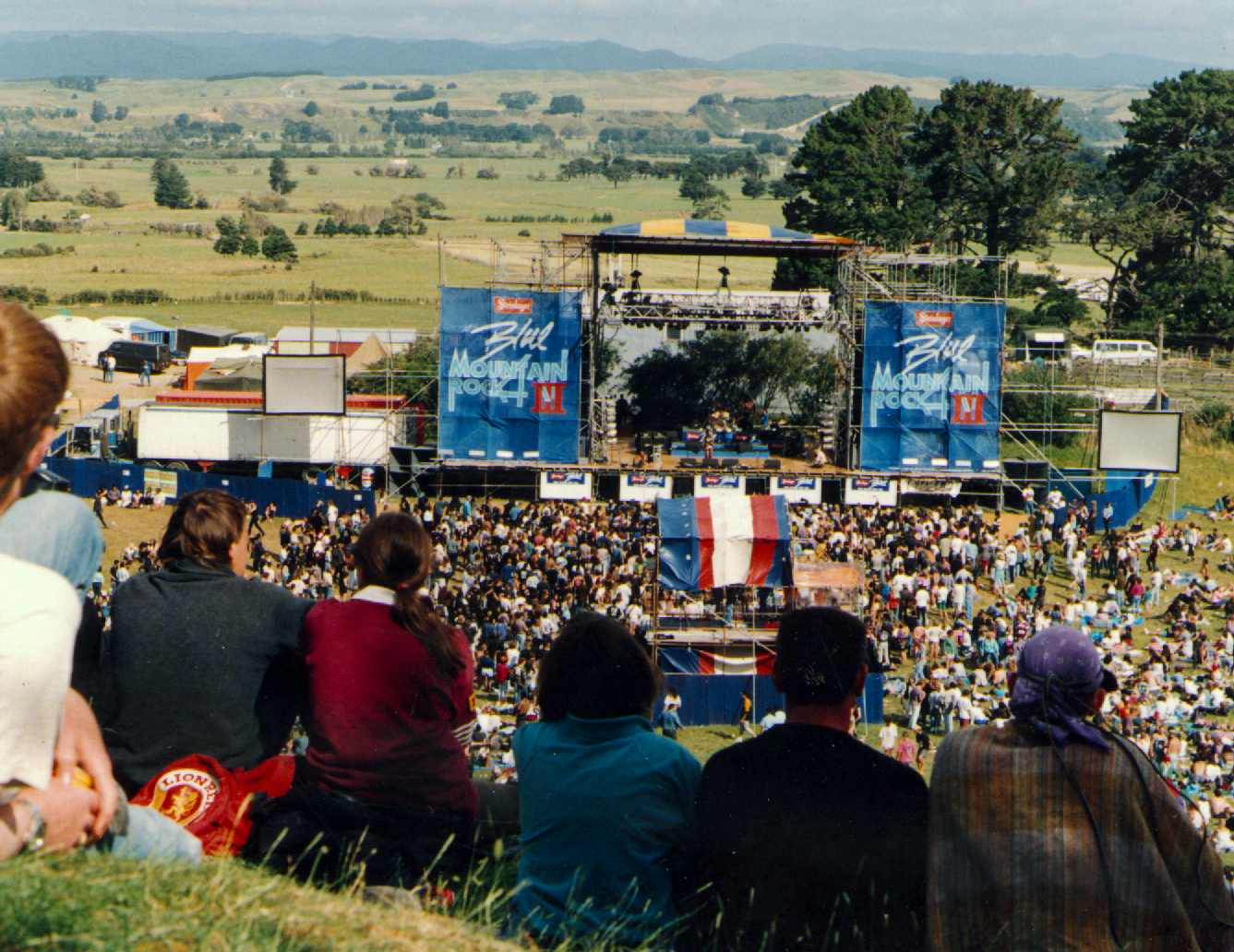
Mountain Rock with Kevin Borich on stage

Music festivals have a long and chequered history in New Zealand. The first large outdoor rock music festivals were Redwood 70 in 1970 and the Great Ngaruawahia Music Festival in 1973. The largest was the 1979 Nambassa festival, one of several Nambassa festivals held around that time, in Golden Valley, just north of Waihi.

"There are regular jazz, folk, ethnic and country music awards and festivals, some of which have been in existence for decades. Large music festivals, for example Sweetwaters Music Festivals, Nambassa and The Big Day Out have been staged periodically since the 1970s", says Te Ara: The Encyclopedia of New Zealand.

== Largest ==
Nambassa 1979 was the largest music event in New Zealand. "Nearly 60,000 came, making it, per capita, the world’s largest festival of its type." "Nambassa will be remembered for many things. It was the largest campsite, the biggest and brightest party, and the best attended and most successful musical and cultural event ever in New Zealand."

== Current recurring events ==
- ANZEM Festival – 2020–Present – Auckland
- Burning Horse Festival – Southland
- Auckland Folk Festival – 1973–present
- AUM New Year's Festival – Auckland
- Bay of Islands Jazz and Blues Festival – 1999 or earlier to present.
- Big Gay Out – 2000–present - Pt Chevalier, Auckland.
- Canterbury Folk Festival – 1975–present. Currently near Waipara, North Canterbury, over Easter
- Coro Summer Fest – 2015–present – small festival in Coromandel Town, held on the second or third weekend of January
- CubaDupa - 2015–present - Huge free street arts festival in Cuba Street, Wellington. 500 events in two days, last weekend of March each year
- Earth Beat Festival — 2015–present, Auckland, New Zealand
- Electric Avenue Festival – 2015–present – Hagley Park, Christchurch
- Festival One – 2005–present – Christian Music Festival
- Hamsterfest Folk Festival – 1970–present
- Highlife NYE Experience – Auckland
- Homegrown – 2008–present in Hamilton
- A Low Hum – 2006–2014 – Small music festival in Wellington each year over Waitangi Weekend. 50 bands over 3 or 4 days.
- Lobofest — annually since 2016 - held at Brighton, near Dunedin, each February
- Luminate Festival – Pikikirunga, Golden Bay, Nelson
- New Zealand International Jazz & Blues Festival – 1999–present, Christchurch
- Northern Bass – 2011–Present, Kaiwaka.
- One Love - 2015–present. Roots and Reggae festival held in Tauranga
- Outfield Music, Food & Festival — 2019–present, Hawke's Bay, New Zealand
- Rhythm & Alps – 2011–present – in Cardrona Valley near Wānaka.
- Rhythm & Vines – 2003–present – vineyard near Gisborne.
- SoundSplash – Whaingaroa / Raglan and Timaru, New Zealand reggae festival.
- Splore – Tapapakanga Regional Park. Ten years festival.
- St Jerome's Laneway Festival – 2010–present – Auckland
- Swampfest – 2004–present – Palmerston North's Globe Theatre.
- Tora Bombora – Tora, South Wairarapa. 2019–present
- Twisted Frequency Festival - 2013–present, Golden Bay, New Zealand
- Waimate Folk Festival – formerly the Whitestone Folk Festival – small festival at Gunns Bush near Waimate in South Canterbury over Queen's Birthday Weekend
- Wellington Folk Festival (Wellyfest) – over Labour Weekend
- Whare Flat Folk Festival – 1975–present, near Whare Flat in the Silverstream Valley, a short distance from Dunedin, over New Year.
- World of Music, Arts and Dance (WOMAD) – New Plymouth
- Salud Festival - A bougie cocktail and music festival in Palmerston North

== Past recurring events ==
- Alpine Unity – 2001–2002, Southern Alps. Later rebranded as Alpine.
- Bay Dreams – 2016–2024. North was held in Mt Maunganui. South was started in Nelson, then moved to Queenstown.
- Big Day Out – 1994–1997, 1999–2012, 2014 – Mt Smart Stadium, Auckland.
- Brown Trout Festival – 1980, 1983 – on a farm east of Dannevirke
- BW Summer Festival – 2004–2015– Lead-up to Rhythm & Vines in Gisborne.
- Cardrona Folk Festival – 1977–2022 – small folk festival in the Cardrona Valley between Wanaka and Arrowtown over Labour Weekend.
- Coromandel Gold – Whitianga.
- Destination – 2001–2004, Cave Stream, Southern Alps.
- The Gathering – 1996–2002 – Canaan Downs, Takaka Hill, near Nelson (96/97, 97/98, 98/99, G2000) and Cobb Valley, Golden Bay, near Nelson (G1 and G2).
- G-TARanaki Guitar Festival – 2008–2010 – International guitar festival in New Plymouth, Taranaki.
- La De Da – 2010–2013 -held at Daisybank Farm, in Martinborough.
- Mountain Rock Music Festival – 1992–1996 – Farm near Pahiatua.
- Nambassa – 1976–1981 – Music and alternatives festivals in Golden Valley, north of Waihi and Waitawheta valley near Waikino.
- Parachute Music Festival – 1995–2014 – contemporary Christian music attracting around 30,000 people each year to Mystery Creek, Waikato.
- Parihaka International Peace Festival – Parihaka – Taranaki. 2006–2010. The farmland close to the three marae at Parihaka was turned into a festival site with camping for four days.
- Phat – Maitai Valley, near Nelson, and Inangahua. The 2007 event was called 'Phat07 Bass Camp'
- Queenstown Winter Festival – 1975–2023 – Queenstown
- Redwood music festivals – unknown – Farm/orchard at Redwood Park, West Auckland.
- Resolution – New Year's Eve dance party near Whitianga, Coromandel.
- Soundscape (New Zealand festival) – 2010–2014 – Hamilton CBD.
- Strawberry Fields Music Festivals – 1993–1995 – Farm near Queenstown; farm at Te Uku near Raglan.
- SummerDaze – Queenstown.
- Sweetwaters Music Festival – 1980–1984, 1999 – Farm near Ngāruawāhia; farm near Pukekawa. A Sweetwaters South festival was also staged in Christchurch in 1985.
- Te Wairua – January 1986–89 and Gathering 1989 and Gathering 1990 (not connected to the Canaan Downs Gatherings); New Age festivals held on a farm east of Ōwhango on the bank of the Whakapapa river. No mainstage, but a marquee and permanent building as HQ. Intensive, day-long Native American style sweat lodges were a feature of these festivals. Te Wairua is Māori for "The Spirit".
- Tui Farm Folk Festival – ?-2020/21 - Near Tapawera in the Nelson district over New Year.
- Visionz music festival, pakawau Billy King creek, Robinsons farm, Golden Bay 2000-2004

== Past events ==
- Concert for the Deaf – unknown – Sports (rugby) stadium in Hamilton.
- Full Circle New Year 31 December 2004 – 2 January 2005. Cobb Valley, Golden Bay.
- The Great Ngaruawahia Music Festival – 6–8 January 1973 – Farm at Ngāruawāhia, 19 kilometres north-west of Hamilton, on the Waikato River.
- Hinuera Music Festival – Farm at Hinuera, near Matamata.
- The Moos – 2001 – Check-Point Charlie – Farm (sheep station) near Rimutaka Forest park.
- Redwood 70 – 31 January–1 February 1970 – Redwood Park, Swanson, West Auckland
- Toots & Grooves – 25–27 January 2008 – Wellington's Ska festival over 2 days.
- Waikino music festival – January 1977 – Farm at Waitawheta near Waikino, between Waihi and Karangahake Gorge. Pre-event run by Nambassa.
- Zombies' Jamboree – c1987 acoustic music festival at Muhunoa, east of Ohau, Horowhenua

== Memorable events ==
- The Great Ngaruawahia Music Festival – Corben Simpson removed all his clothes on stage and was reported nationwide in the media, Black Sabbath burned a cross on the hill while getting the entire audience to light a match or lighter. "Todd (Hunter) ... gathered some friends and fellow performers for an appearance at the Great Ngaruawahia Music Festival. They wrote original songs for their set list, and someone pulled the name "Dragon" out of an I Ching book. Their performance at the Ngaruawahia Music Festival led to a better gig, a few weeks performing at the Occidental Hotel in Auckland."
- Sweetwaters Music Festival – On closing night with jam packed traffic, A man had a serious seizure, a doctor was called via helicopter, the police boat transferred the man across the Waipa river to a waiting ambulance, bound for Waikato hospital. On opening night a girl broke both ankles while riding the bonnet of a car into the farm.
- Hinuera – Mother Goose.
- Hinuera – Ragnarok The main stage stopped due to rain, a rapid system was put together in the Barn for Ragnarok, using Greg Peacocks Cerwin-Vega composite bins, previously used as cross stage side fill monitors, on the main stage.
- Rhythm & Vines – In 2014, a large riot broke out on New Year's Eve at Gisborne's BW campground. The campground traditionally played host to a majority of the Rhythm & Vines festival attendees. In the years leading up to 2014, a culture of excessive drinking and raucous behaviour, particularly on the final day of the festival, had been established at the campground. The campground's liberal B.Y.O. policy enabled festival attendees to load up on alcohol throughout New Year's Eve, prior to boarding buses to the nearby R&V festival where B.Y.O. was not permitted. Unlike previous years, the 2014 BW campground did not allow campers to enter sections of the campground aside from that in which they were tenting. This enforced segregation of campers was disliked by many attendees, and early in the afternoon, as excitement began to build for the night ahead, a coordinated effort was made by a minority of campers to attempt to tear down the deer fencing which divided the campground. Security was quickly overwhelmed, and the successful flattening of the first fence sparked general dissent and disorderly behaviour throughout the entire campground. Over the next few hours chaos ensued, as tents and gazebos were systematically flattened and set on fire by punters. Several large bonfires were fuelled by tents and camping equipment. The event resulted in 63 arrests, 83 reported injuries, and seven hospital admissions. As attendees began boarding the buses to the nearby site of the RnV festival, the violence died away leaving a ruined campground. Tighter security at the site of the R&V festival meant that the overflow of disorder between BW campground and the main event was minimal. 2014 was the final year that BW hosted Rhythm and Vines attendees en masse. Partly as a result of this event, summer music festivals with B.Y.O. alcohol licenses have become almost unheard of in New Zealand.

== Gallery ==
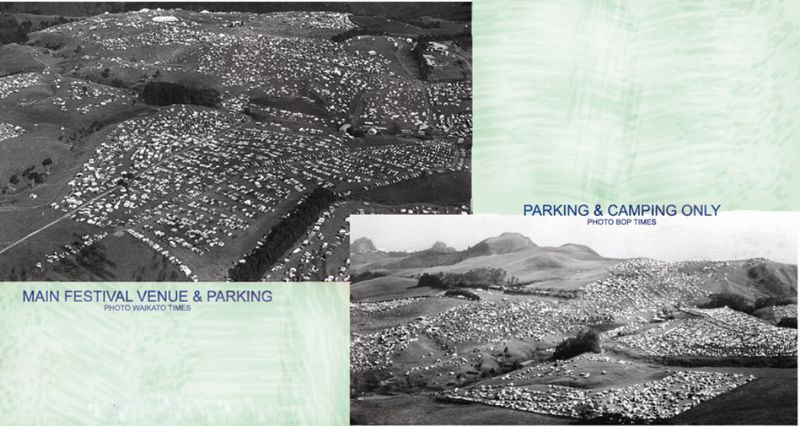
Nambassa 1979 aerial

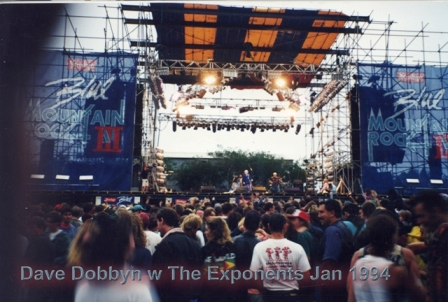
Dave Dobbyn

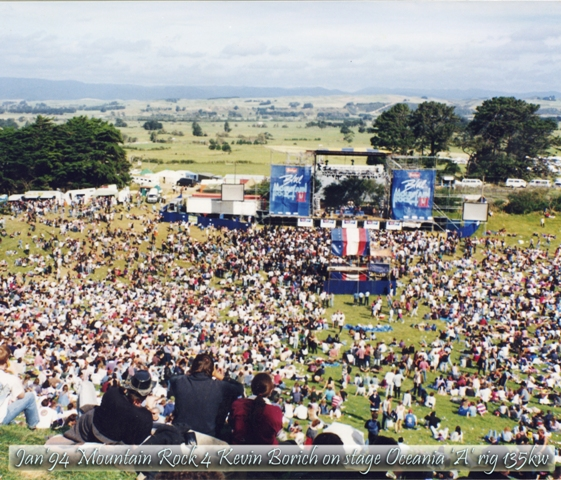
Mountain Rock 3

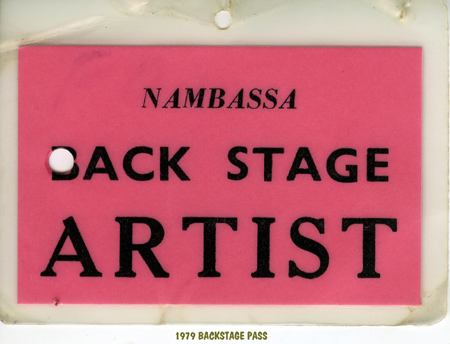
Back stage pass

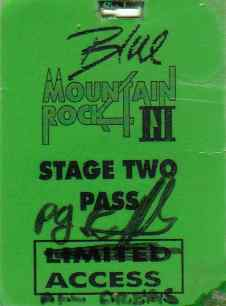
AAA pass for Mountain Rock hand-signed by promoter

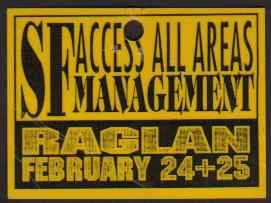
Strawberry Fields AAA (access all areas) pass

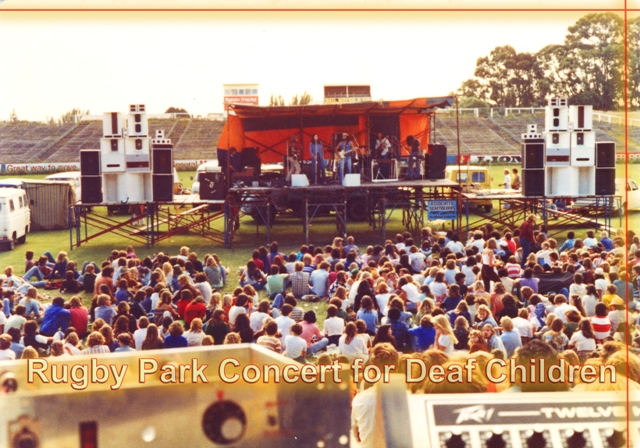
Concert for the Deaf

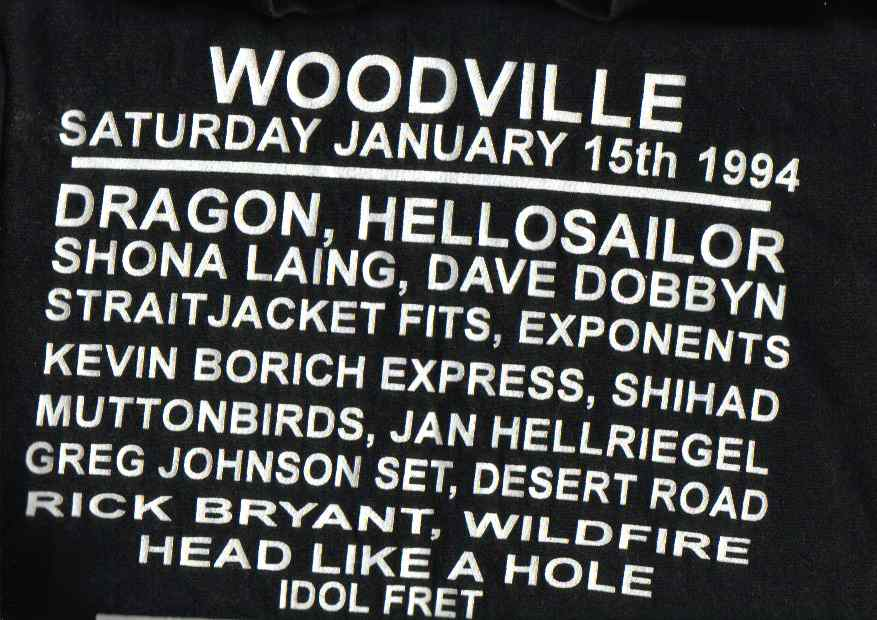
Mountain Rock T-shirt

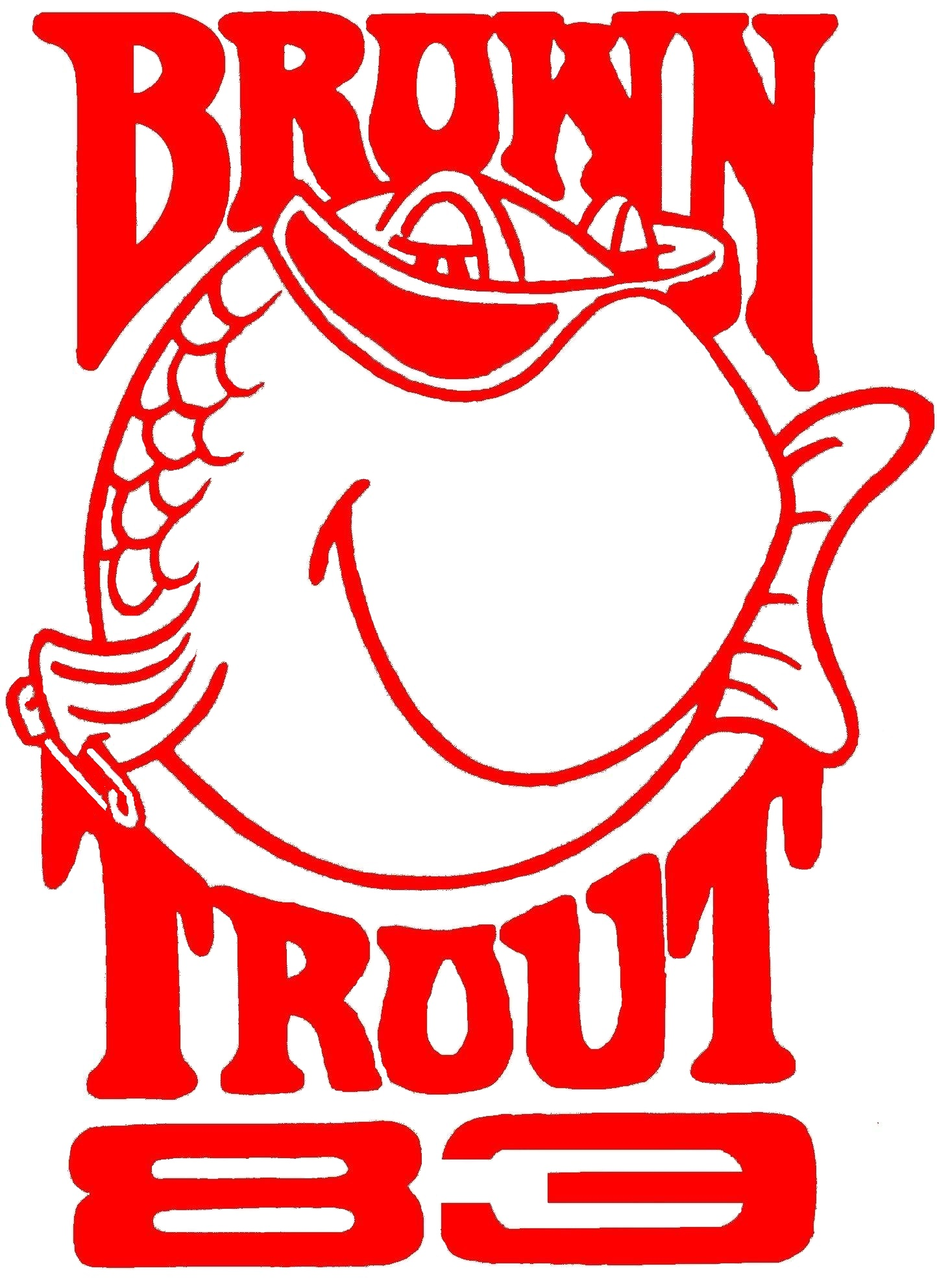
Brown Trout 83 Logo

== Books ==
- Keighley, Daniel. Sweetwaters: The Untold Story. Reviewed by Simon Sweetman: "Daniel Keighley was the man behind the financial disaster that was Sweetwaters ’99. He was charged with fraud and jailed and Sweetwaters: The Untold Story is his account of what went wrong. Billed as an autobiography."
- Nambassa: A New Direction, edited by Colin Broadley and Judith Jones, A. H. & A. W. Reed, 1979.
- Dix, J. (1988) Stranded in paradise: New Zealand rock'n'roll 1955–1988. Wellington: Paradise Publications. ISBN 0-473-00639-1.
