= Nambassa Winter Show with Mahana =

The Nambassa Winter Show with Mahana was all about a bunch of aspiring young hippie entertainers who moved into a youth camp in West Auckland, out of which this community of 60 people produced and directed two musical theatrical productions and toured the North Island of New Zealand in a convoy of Mobile homes, buses and vans, performing at major centres and theatres throughout September and October 1978. While initially four main shows were scheduled for this collective theatre company, repeat and spontaneous performances around the nation saw this number of live performances increased to over 10. This theatrical extravaganza was organised by the Nambassa Trust as part of its national promotion of the arts and towards promoting its 1979 three-day music, crafts and Alternative lifestyle festival, which was held in Waihi and attracted 70,000 people.

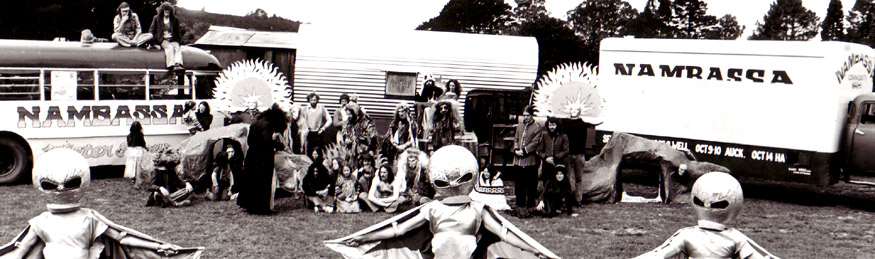
Cast and crew ready to roll late October 1978

The Winter Show production had two parts. The Mahana rock opera, a live rock-theatre production made up of both Māori and Pākehā, combining traditional Māori songs and dances with modern rock music, and depicting early white European colonisation of New Zealand and the impact this had on its local indigenous Māori people. The second part was a high-energy theatre-rock production based on the old theme of cooperation versus competition. The "Return of the Ancients" told the story of the battle between "space angels" and "black magicians" for control of the planet earth. This visual creation was made up of actors, dancers and mime artists performing to a background of rock music, extravagant lighting with weird special effects, fire, bizarre costumes and giant masks.

== Background ==
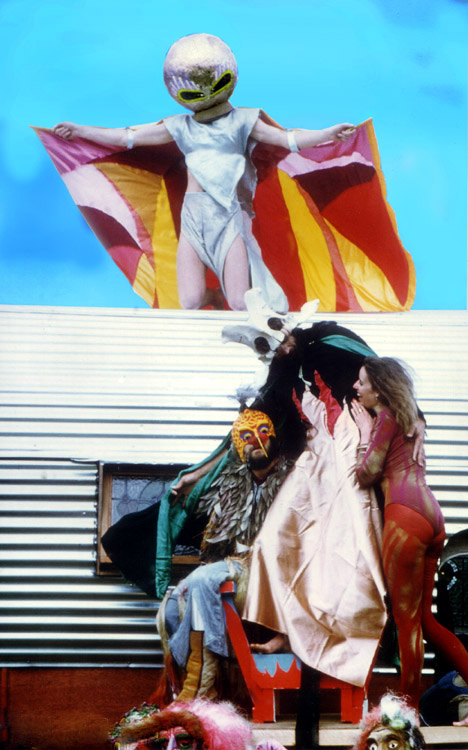
Return of the Ancients 1978.

The Nambassa Winter show was coordinated on a voluntary basis by proud young unemployed kiwi hippies against a national backdrop of high unemployment in New Zealand. This era heralded the reformation of many social issues and cultural ideas, with youth (today's baby boomers), encouraging social revolution, while reshaping creativity and artistic direction away from the norm. This period in New Zealand also witnessed many young indigenous Māori activists protesting for land rights and to have past land acquisitions recognised and recompensed. This was the roaring seventies and countercultural idealism was in full swing.

The first 1978 Nambassa festival had been successful and some of the profits from this event were drafted into their Winter Show.

To make this event a reality, the Nambassa core group, who were based in the country villages of Waihi and Waikino at the foot of the ecologically sensitive Coromandel Peninsula, temporarily moved to the city and hired the St John youth camp west of Auckland, from where this production was implemented. Professional and amateur actors, musicians and dancers, choreographers, seamstresses, chiefs, masseurs, prop designers, auto mechanics, various sound and lighting technicians, roadies and administrators (who doubled as actors) assembled at the St Johns camp where, over a period of two months, this production was created and rehearsed. This was a live-in workshop, as most participants in the Winter Show were encouraged to take up temporary residency at the camp; thus the Mother Centre was established. Many participating amateurs later carved out professional careers in the entertainment industry.

== Mahana Rock opera ==
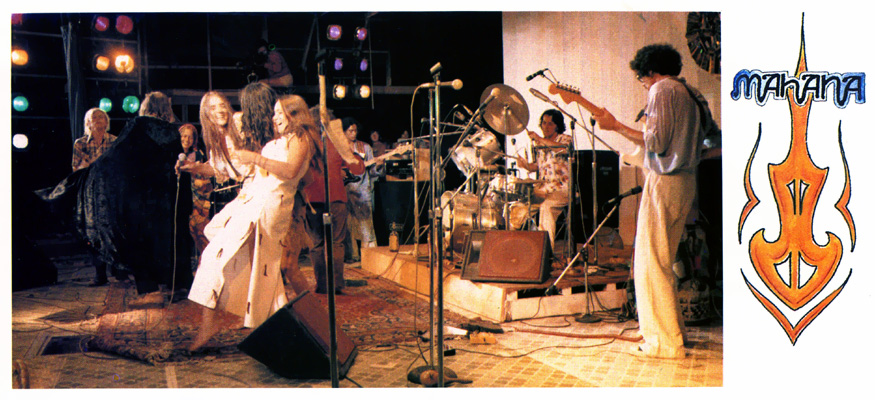
Mahana

To most people Mahana was a rock band.

To the folk involved Mahana was a travelling road-show,

a spiritual family, a community on wheels.

The musical production of The Mahana rock opera was a colourful and perceptive view of early New Zealand life and began with the coming of the Māori in canoes from the South West Pacific, their meeting on the high seas and subsequent voyaging to Aotearoa. It portrayed the arrival of the white man, his politics, his religion, early colonisation and the often negative transformation of the country dear to Māoridom. The storyline and music climaxed as Māori and Pākehā do battle with each other, and continued with the eventual reconciliation of the two races. The rock opera employed many special effects, costumes, and some 20 actors, singers and musicians.

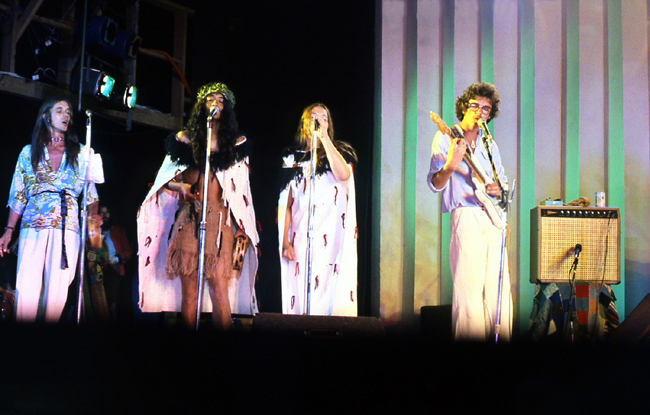
Mahana's John Tucker, Bobby Simmons, Dale Whitcombe and John Cossar at Nambassa 1978.

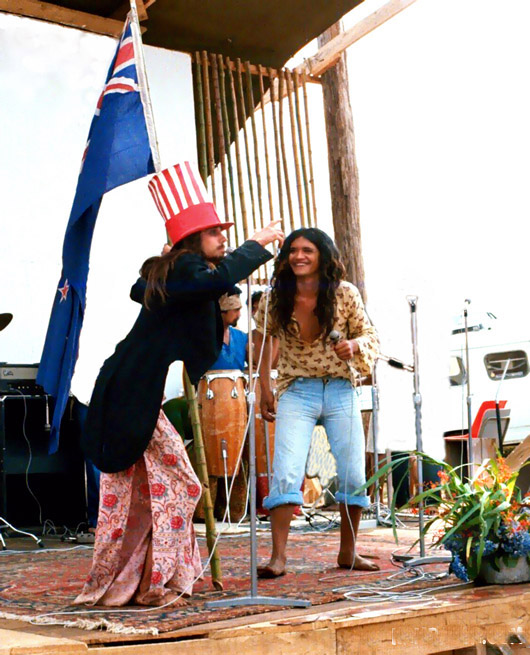
Mahana's John Tucker and Bobby Simmons on Nambassa Aerial Railway, January 1978

Mahana was formed in 1977 when a group of Māori and Pākehā friends who were mobile-truckers started jamming together. What they shared was a common bond. They were all mobile and lived with their families in a nomadic gypsy lifestyle in handcrafted house trucks and buses. They first came to notoriety when they performed on the Aerial Railway stage at the 1978 Nambassa three-day festival, becoming a huge hit. They called themselves "Mahana" in honour of a friend who loaned them his equipment to perform the 1978 festival. Within 24 hours and by popular acclaim they were headlining on the Nambassa main stage with a 20,000W PA in front of tens of thousands of people.

After the Winter show Mahana performed at the Nambassa 1979 three-day festival in Waihi in front of 40,000 fans and again at the 1981 five-day celebration up Waitawheta valley. At Nambassa 1979 they formed their own self-contained gypsy encampment circle incorporating dozens of house-trucks and buses. This was the beginning of the Road-show Fayre era, and within their large magic circle enclosure, continuous entertainment and theatre was available for children and adults, organised and spontaneous. After the festival the Roadshow Fayre and Mahana continued their musically-founded gypsy lifestyle, touring from town to town entertaining people throughout the nation. Mahana was filmed live on the main stage at Nambassa 1979. The film was part of the New Zealand Film Commissions entry to the 1980 Cannes Film Festival.

By telling the story of New Zealand through a musical blending of the two cultures it was hoped that the Rock Opera would provide a vehicle to express their collective feeling of Ko Tahi Tatou, "We are one together."

Mahana Rock Opera written by Billy TK and Mahana, and Produced and Directed by John Tucker and Mahana.

== The Return of the Ancients ==
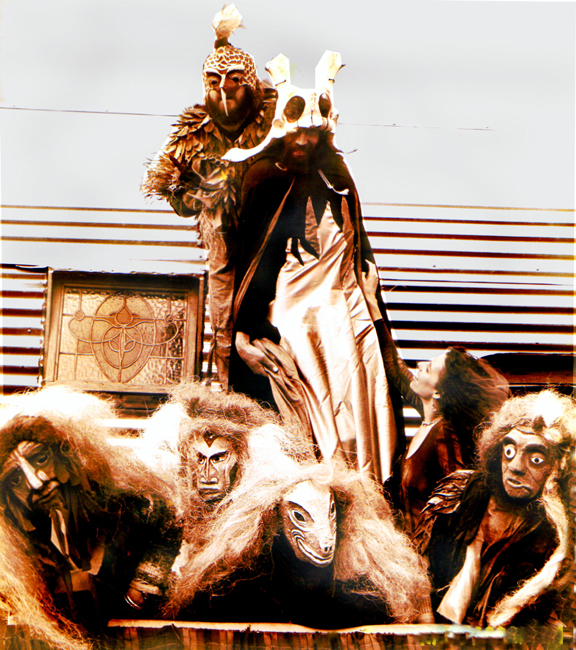
Return of the Ancients Ogias implementing civilization collapse.

The Return of the Ancients (1978) was a musical theatrical opera which presented a story told in the year 2975 by an old man from another dimension who recounted to the audience a strange and forgotten tale. He spoke of the legend of the lost planet earth, the evolution of humankind and the frail path humans have walked to find their destiny, encountering dark forces reincarnated as humans who sought to destroy culture and civilization. Utilising best of 1970s visual technology using pulsating light beams, theatre, dance, mime, photo projections, fire, costume and rock music, the production portrays the age-old cosmic battles between the past and the future. The audience witnessed the seeming peace and tranquility at some point in evolution with live music from the legendary Rick Steele, Norma Leaf and Ted Chapman. But civilisation regressed, reflected by fast on-stage theatrics, heavy rock and explosions of special effects. Humans had to suffer captivity at the hands of the black magicians, ogias and demons that followed and obeyed the prince of darkness. Theatrically extravagant cosmic battles were fought live on stage as "Space Angels" dressed in multi-coloured rainbow cloaks descended from other planetary systems through two powerful beams of light, to do battle with the negative forces controlling and threatening the existence of planet Earth and its inhabitants.

The Return of the Ancients was written and produced by Peter Terry, Directed by Chris Cooper, Matthew Robinson and Grant Bridger.

== Principal winter show cast ==
The return of the Ancients

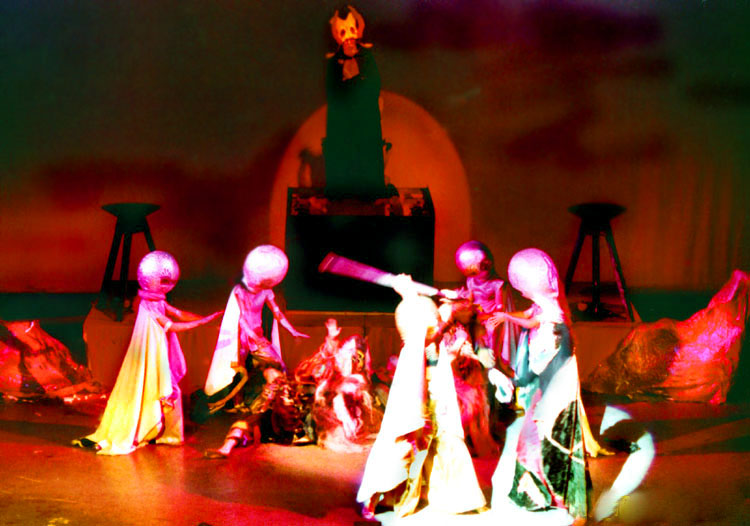
Space Angels saving civilization in the Return of the Ancients.

Danze co:

Dancers: Donna Farhi, Stephanie Burns, Caryn Dudson, Matthew Robertson, John Tresize, Bev Wynyard, Brian Tracey, Ellen Currie, Terry Blade and Greg Norman.

Nambas Theatre troupe:

Fire eating: Mike Colonna and Dave Sheridan.

Fire dancers: Donna Farhi, Bev Wynyard and Stephanie Burns.

Prince of darkness: Brian Tracey.

Devil man: Daniel Keighley.

Ogias or Ogre: Shak MacCready, Fred Alder, Ted Chapman, Peter Terry, Ellen Currie and Brett Fitzpatrick.

Space Angels: John Tresize, Terry Blade, Bev Wynyard, Matthew Robertson and Greg Norman.

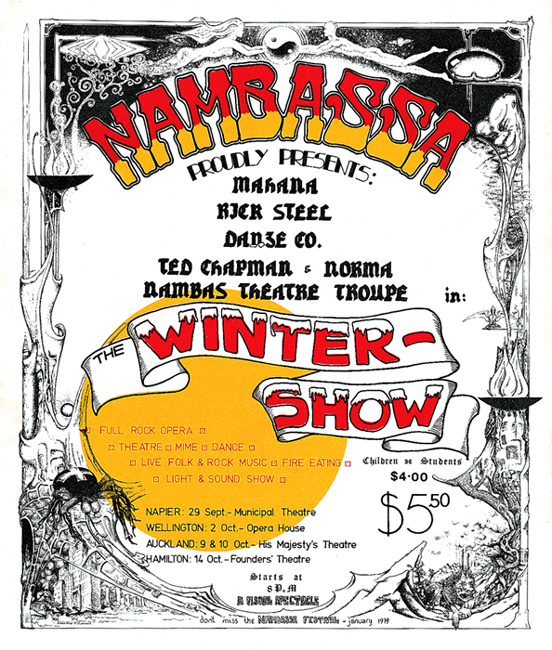
Poster by Neil Wernham

Sun Dancers: Mike Colonna, Dave Sheridan, Mike Taylor and Caryn Dudson.

Live Music by: Rick Steele, Ted Chapman and Norma Leaf.

Original music score written, arranged and performed by Simon Alexander. Produced and mixed by Simon Alexander and Doug Rogers at Harlequin Studios.

Mahana Rock Opera

Lead guitar: John Cossar. 2nd guitar: Aramete. Drums: Stuart Crooks, Bass: Corben Simpson. Sax: Jim Dixon, Keyboards: Ben Grudd, Acoustic guitars: Bobby Simmons, Waka Kimera. Backing vocals: Mahia Blackmore, Dale Whitcombe, John Tucker. Land agent: John Tucker. Priest: Daniel Keighley. Pioneers wife: Pauline Mann. Māori people: Waka Kimera, Mahia Blackmore and Norma Leaf. Soldiers: Podge and Shak MaCready. Narration: Matthew Robertson. Māori tribal leader: Bobby Simmons. Pioneer: Mike Colonna.

Winter Show Production team

Lighting: Jay McCoy, Andrew McNicoll, Jeff O'Donnell and Brett Fitzpatrick (Radar). Sound: Moby, Easy and Mark. Choreography and artistic direction: Chris Cooper Special effects: Mike Taylor. Masks: Matthew Robertson. Costumes: Pauline Mann and Ellen Currie. Road crew: Pixie Fox, Doug Lawrence, Podge, Dianne and Robert Briar. Winter Show Produced and Directed by Peter Terry.

== New Zealand's Housetruckers of the 1970s ==
New Zealand's Housetruckers of the 1970s. Housetruckers are individuals, families and groups who convert old trucks and school buses into mobile-homes and live in them, preferring an unattached and transient gypsy lifestyle to more conventional housing. These unique vehicles began appearing around New Zealand during the mid-1970s and even though there are fewer today they continue to adorn NZ roads.

== Gallery ==
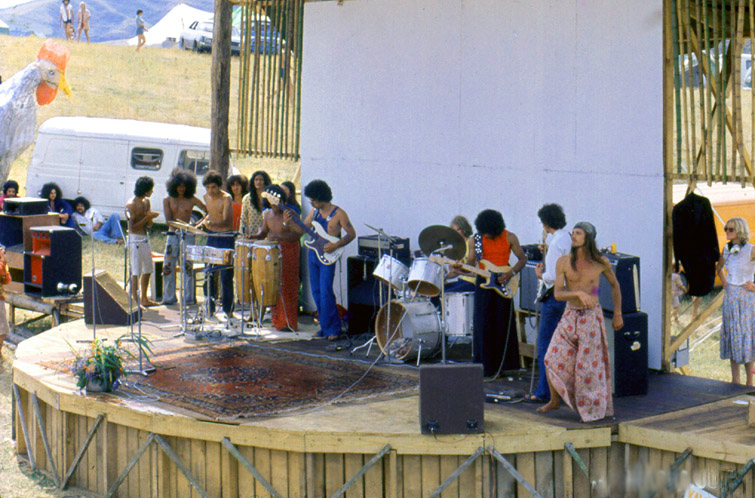
Mahana on Aerial Railway Nambassa January 1978.

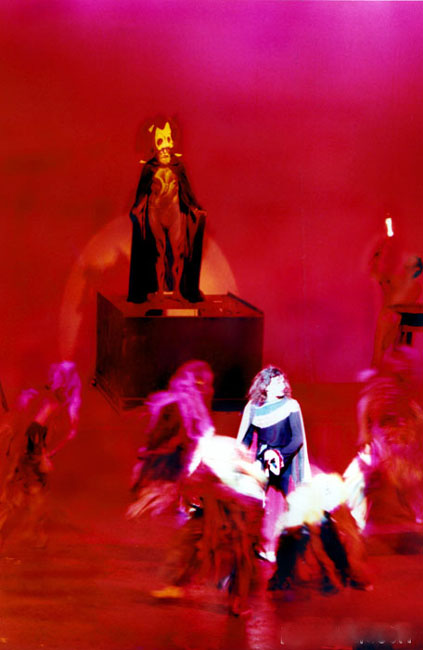
Winter Show, Prince of darkness in action in, "Return of the Ancients".1978.

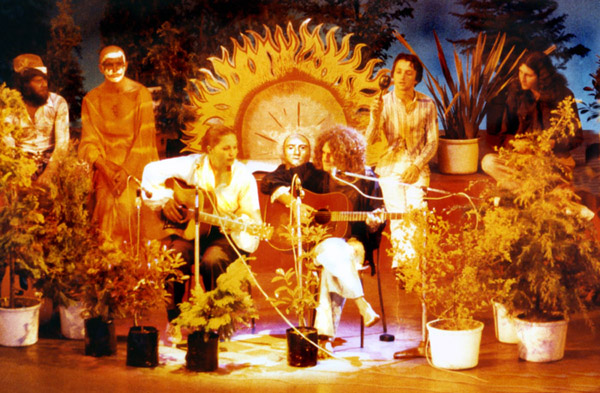
Ted Chapman and Norma Leaf on Winter Show.1978.

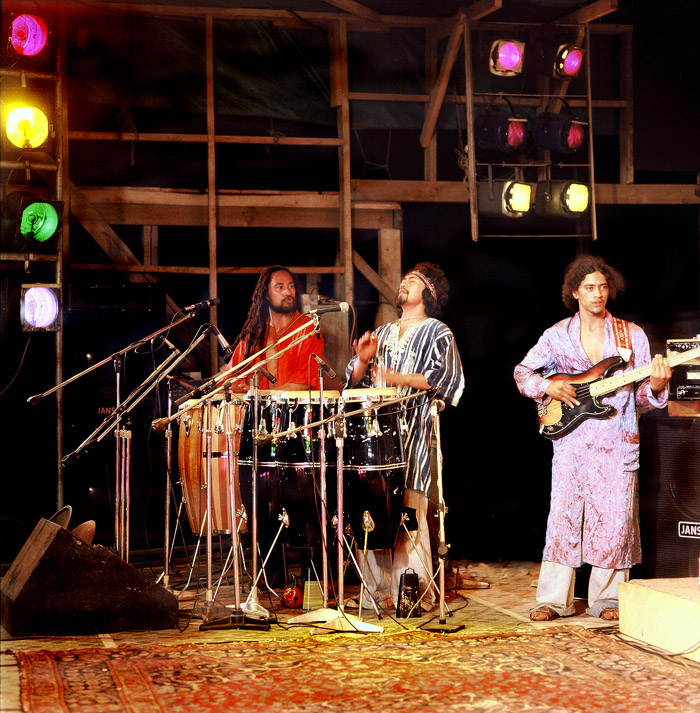
Mahana on main stage at Nambassa 1979.

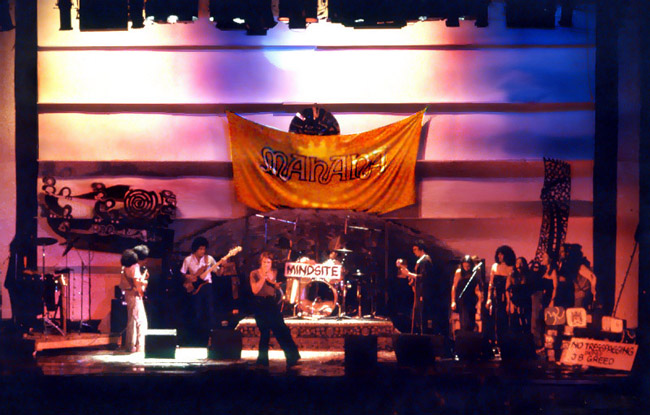
Mahana on Redhat Theatre at Nambassa 1981.

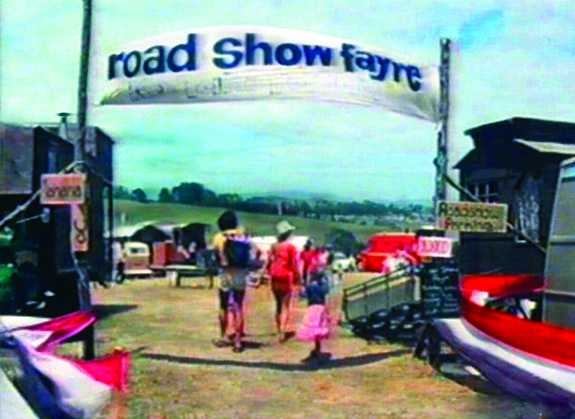
Mahana Roadshow Fayre at Nambassa 1979.

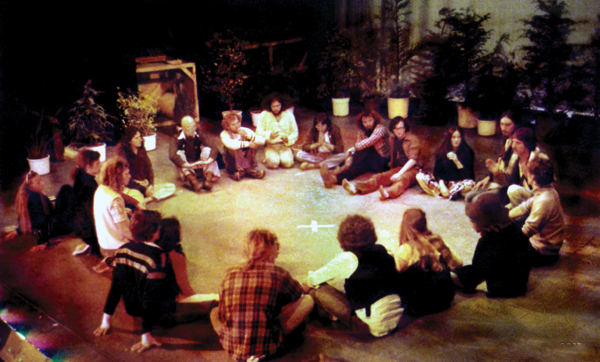
Mother Centre meeting, Winter Show 1978.

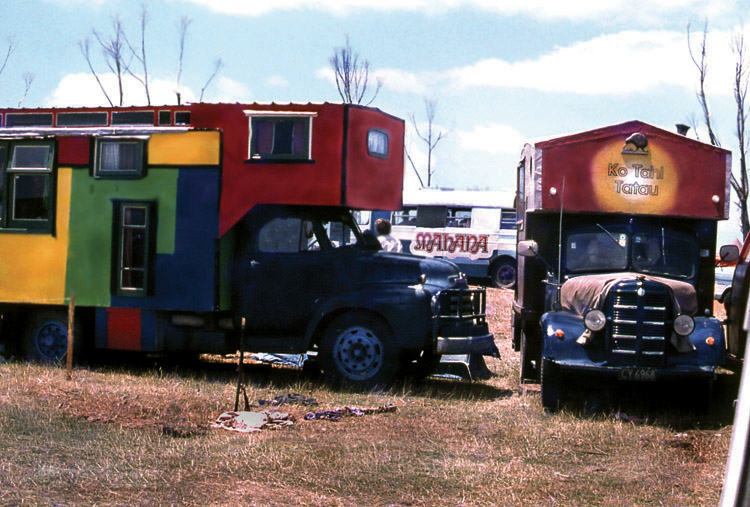
"Mahana Roadshow" at Nambassa 1979.

== See also ==
- Nambassa
- New Zealand's Housetruckers of the 1970s
- Waikino music festival
- Hippies
- Blerta
- New age travellers
- Māori protest movement
