= Housetrucker =

People who convert old trucks and school buses into mobile homes

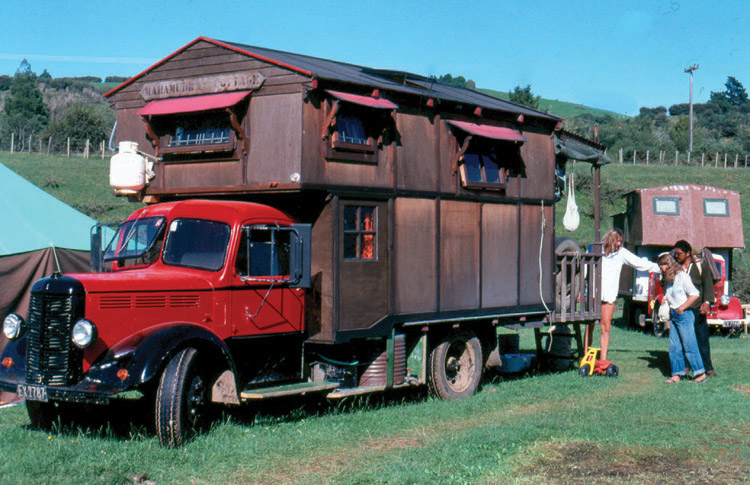
1981 Nambassa

Housetruckers are individuals, families and groups who convert old trucks and school buses into portable homes called housetrucks and live in them, preferring an unattached and transient lifestyle to more conventional housing. These vehicles began appearing around New Zealand during the mid-1970s and, even though there are fewer today, they continue to travel New Zealand roads.

By the 21st century these hippie nomads were found traveling independently and in convoys from town to town making a living from small cottage industries such as arts and crafts, or following various fruit picking seasons as they occurred throughout the nation. Other part-time housetruckers use their handcrafted rigs only when taking an extended holiday. Some older vehicles which no longer operate are lifted on blocks and used as permanent caravans or extra rooms on properties and in caravan parks.

== New Zealand connection ==
There are few places left in the world where housetrucking can be an uninhibited lifestyle with the kinds of simple homemade rigs New Zealand boasts. In other countries stringent laws regarding the roadworthy standards of older vehicles have forced many old housetrucks and buses from the roads and into graveyards of isolated farm paddocks and wrecking yards. Other laws concerning where one may park or camp have seriously restricted life on the road. The Kiwi housetrucker, living within a culture which popularizes the benefits of preserving these old motor relics, appreciates their truckers' haven. That New Zealand transport law requires that all vehicles submit to a thorough mechanical Warrant of Fitness every six months ensures that these old motor-homes remain roadworthy.

Many housetruckers choose to travel in convoy, and in New Zealand there are trucker groups of families who travel together from city to city, and who assemble most weekends in different parks to hold markets from where they sell their wares. There are two separate groups who travel New Zealand today selling their market goods; these are Gypsy Faire and Gypsy Travelers.

Throughout the 1970s and 1980s many housetruck conventions and grass-roots festivals of all themes were held throughout New Zealand where housetruckers would converge, not only for the event, but for the opportunity to connect and share information with other truckers from across the nation. These events were conducted around areas considered as alternative lifestyle zones within the country. Many a low-key festival circuit was held throughout the regions of Coromandel, Northland, West Auckland, the west coast of the South Island and in the Nelson area. For two decades Mollers farm at Oratia west of Auckland, a popular venue for blues and folk festivals, offered an open house for truckers to park on a semi-permanent basis.

== History ==
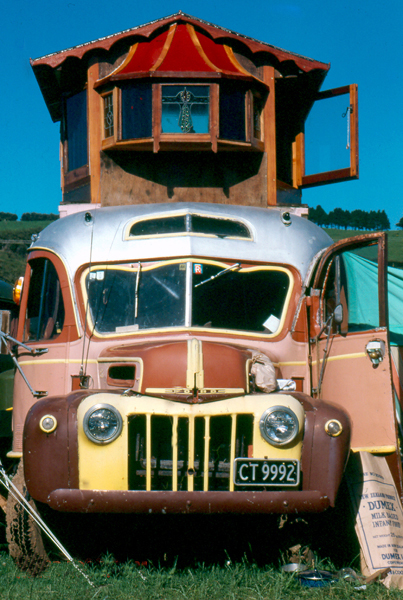
1981 Housebus at Nambassa.

The idea of the nomadic styled mobile home was spawned from the international 1960s and 1970s counterculture movements, New Zealand with its unique Kiwi experience was fashioned from the early American and British hippie crusades and the then alternative music revolution. In the 1960s and 1970s hippie culture spread worldwide through a fusion of rock music, folk, blues, and psychedelic rock; it also found expression in the arts, specifically in literature, the dramatic arts and the creative arts. The early and modern housetruckers essentially derived their cultures and belief systems from these original influences.

The first groups of housetruckers to travel in a co-ordinated convoy was the Nambassa Winter Show with Mahana in 1978 and then again Mahana traveling with the Roadshow Fayre after the 1979 Nambassa festival.

=== Nambassa Winter Show with Mahana ===
The Nambassa Winter Show with Mahana was a musical theatrical production of 60 entertainers and crew who toured the North Island of New Zealand in a convoy of mobile homes, buses and vans, performing at major centres and theatres throughout September and October 1978. While initially four main shows were scheduled for this collective theatre company, repeat and spontaneous performances around the nation saw this number of live performances increased to over ten. This theatrical extravaganza was organised by the Nambassa Trust as part of its national promotion of the arts and towards promoting its 1979 three-day music, crafts and alternative lifestyle festival which was held in Waihi.

=== The Nambassa festival connection ===
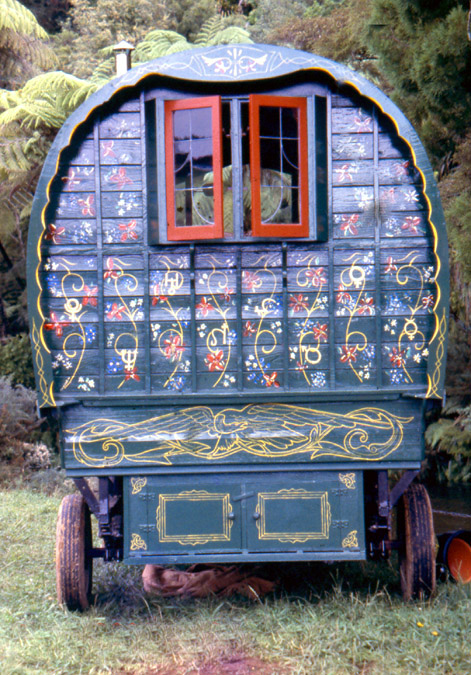
Horse drawn home at Nambassa 1981.

The New Zealand handcrafted house-truck fad found its early roots around the period of the 1970s Nambassa alternative festivals. The annual mobile homes pilgrimage to Nambassa grew in strength, and creative design of trucks increased, as each festival unfolded, culminating in a display of thousands of unique rigs and vans at the 1981 festival. Some debates allegedly occurred around camp fires arguing as to who actually built the first machines to adorn New Zealand roads.

Throughout the 1980s many mobile homes frequented the Sweetwater's music festivals, and alternative festivals regularly held throughout the country.

=== Nambassa ===
Between 1976 and 1981, hippie music festivals were held on large farms around Waihi and Waikino in New Zealand-Aotearoa. Named "Nambassa", the festivals focused on peace, love, and a balanced lifestyle, featuring workshops and displays advocating alternative lifestyles, clean and sustainable energy, and unadulterated foods. Nambassa is also the tribal name of a trust that has championed sustainable ideas and demonstrated practical counterculture and alternative lifestyle methods since the early 1970s.

Road folk will insist that a mobile home is the ideal hippie set up for home ownership, self sufficiency, transport and to facilitate a free nomadic lifestyle. And in the 1970s anyone in New Zealand could own one very cheaply.

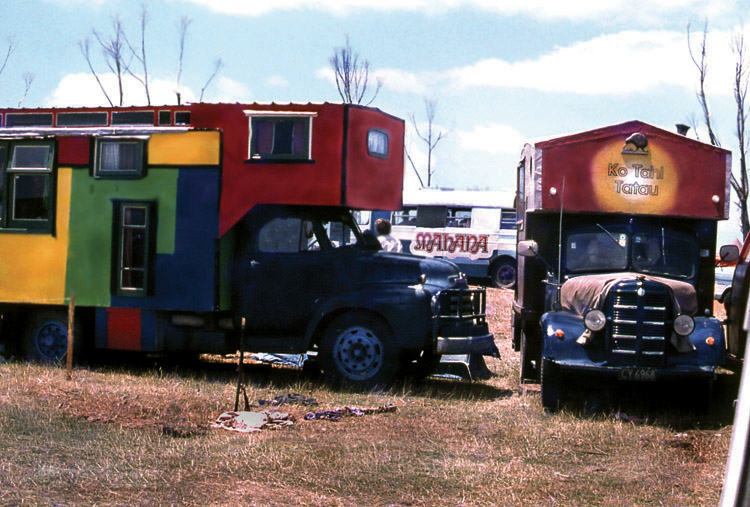
"Mahana Roadshow" at Nambassa 1979.

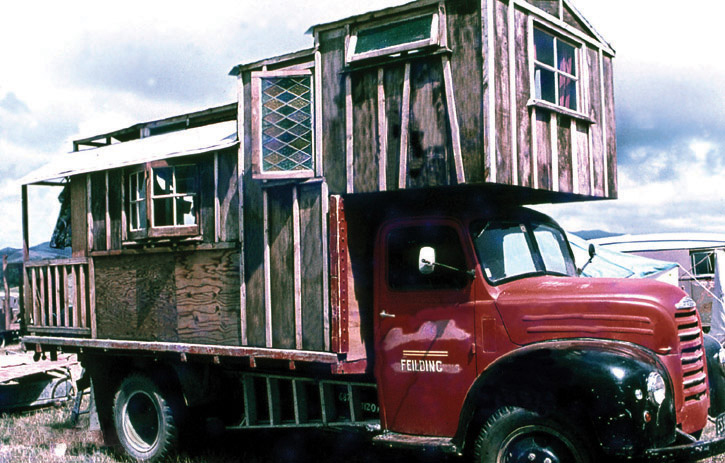
A very early seventies housetruck at Nambassa 1978.

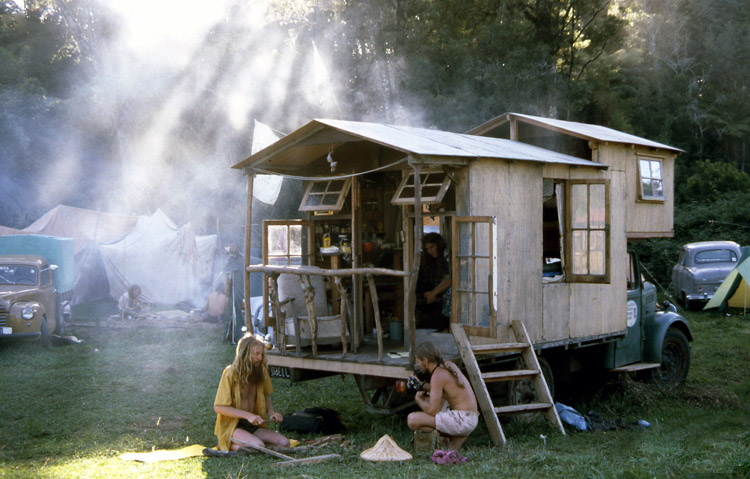
1981 Mobile home at Nambassa.

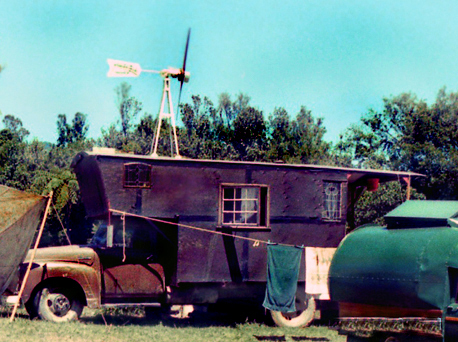
Housetruck with development handmade wind-generator technology

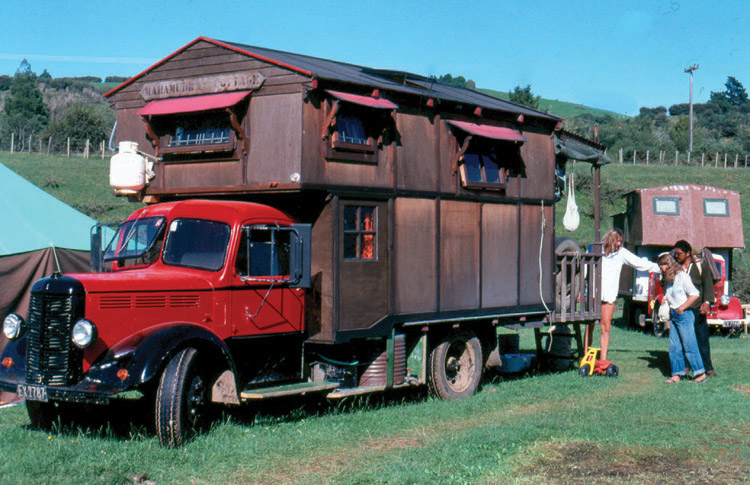
1981 Nambassa.

=== Construction ===
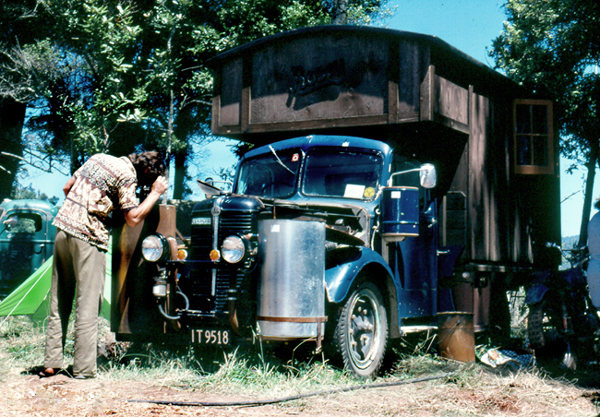
Nambassa 1981 "Gas producer" house-truck.

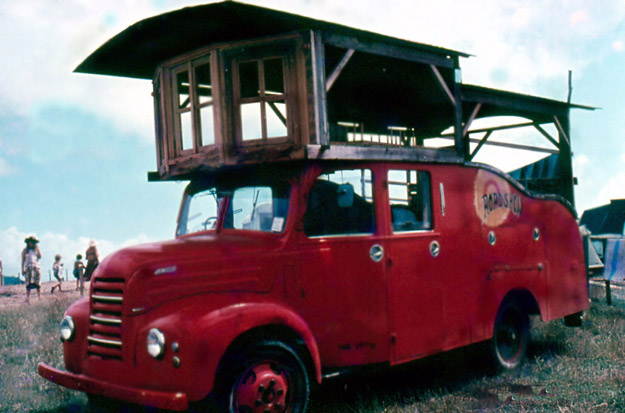
1977 housetruck under construction for the Roadshow.

Most 1970s mobile homes were constructed from the chassis upwards utilising predominantly cheap recycled materials. Throughout this era house-truck rigs were constructed on the decks of old ex-farm trucks which could then be purchased for $500 to $2,500. House-buses were either stripped down to the chassis in preparation for construction or just added onto, to facilitate increased living areas. As opposed to the bright colourful American and British versions of the 1960s, many of the early Kiwi trucks were finished in earthy coloured timber exteriors. This was due to the use in the 1970s by Toyota of marine grade plywood for crates to import their vehicles from Japan. The crates came with good quality framed floors. This was suitable material to construct and clad a house truck. In the 1970s one could then purchase a complete car crate for around $25. An average size house-truck took around five car crates to build. In the 1970s a large number of derelict country farm houses from New Zealand's early colonial days were being demolished, these contained recyclable rare timbers such as kauri, totara and rimu. Other materials were purchased from timber recyclers and secondhand traders. Wood-fired potbelly stoves were used for cooking, heating hot water and warmth over the winter months. As most housetrucks parked in non-residential areas few of the early housetrucks were wired for mains electricity. Gas lighting and candles were the norm. Some trucks utilised a small gas or kerosene stove to supplement cooking over hot summer months. All these items were purchased second hand. Some early 1970s rigs experimented with homemade wind turbines for lighting; however these large units even though they were fastened to the roof during travel, proved awkward. Today, smaller modern units can be purchased at a reasonable price. Some housetruckers attached gas producer units to their rigs, effectively running their engines for free on charcoal gas.

== See also ==
- The Flying Classroom
- Nambassa
- Nambassa Winter Show with Mahana
- New age travellers
- Recreational vehicle
- Small house movement
- Truck sleeper
- Van-dwelling
