= Waikino school shooting =

1923 school shooting in Waikino, New Zealand

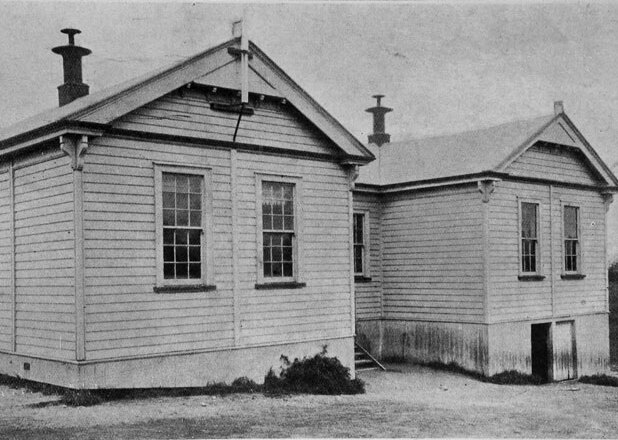
- The Waikino schoolhouse.

- Waikino (New Zealand)
- Location: 37.4091°S 175.7708°E; Waikino School, Waikino, New Zealand
- Date: 19 October 1923; 103 years ago
- Attack type: Mass shooting
- Weapon: Colt automatic revolver
- Deaths: 2
- Injuries: 6
- Perpetrator: John Christopher Higgins
- Motive: Delusions of persecution

The Waikino school shooting took place on 19 October 1923 at Waikino School in Waikino, near Waihi, in the Waikato district of New Zealand's North Island. It claimed the lives of two students, Kelvin McLean, aged 13, and Charles Stewart, aged 9. Six others were also injured.

The gunman, John Christopher Higgins (–1938), was later convicted of murder and sentenced to death, later commuted to life imprisonment on the grounds of insanity. It is the first and only mass school shooting in New Zealand history.

== Background ==
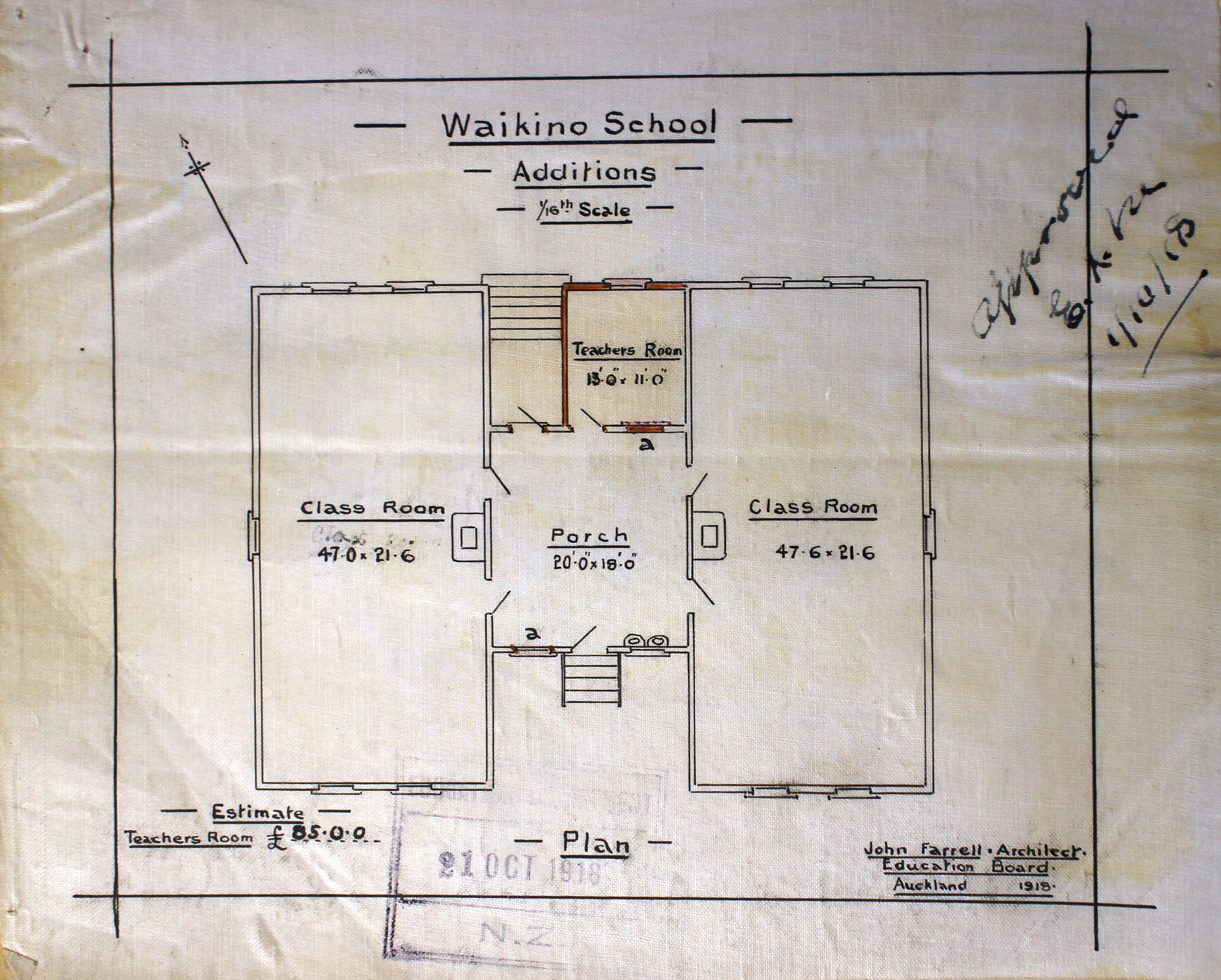
The layout of the school

Waikino is a small town, the economy based largely on gold processing, possessing the largest quartz-crushing plant used for gold extraction in 1923. The Waikino School was built c. 1905, and had 143 students. The school's principal was Robert Theodore Reid, and it had a student teacher, two other assistant teachers, and two probationers.

=== Perpetrator ===
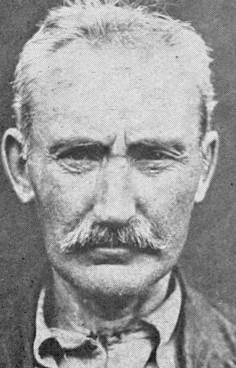
Higgins's mugshot

John Christopher Higgins, a Canadian, had arrived in New Zealand 15 years prior to the shooting. He was a firewood dealer and lived in Waitāwheta, across the Ohinemuri River from Waikino. He had conflict with the Waikino School after a truancy officer visited him and fined him for keeping his children home and locking them in the house to watch over the property.

After a series of personal problems – his chickens died, bees were stolen from his hives, and other people's cattle grazed on his land after his fences were cut – he blamed his neighbours. His coworkers teased him for his believing in a personal conspiracy against him, calling him "Mad John". Two days before the shooting, he found his horse dead, and claimed someone had killed it, again blaming his neighbours.

== Shooting ==
On 19 October 1923, at 10 a.m., Higgins arrived at the school with a .32 calibre Colt automatic revolver, saying he had "come for revenge" and rambling about being persecuted. Robert Theodore Reid, the headmaster, noticed Higgins, and brought him into the study. Higgins then pulled out a gun.

Reid tried to convince him to leave. Higgins told him he wanted revenge on the children of people who had wronged him, and when Reid suggested he go to the battery and target the men who had wronged him, he refused. After he realised Higgins would not listen, he tried to warn the teachers and children and tried to physically stop him, before Higgins shot him through the jaw.

Onlookers noted he seemed to be looking for specific people. Some students jumped out the windows to escape, while others hid behind desks and cupboards. Teachers led students to safety. Higgins walked up to Kelvin McLean, aged 13, who pleaded for his life, having helped Higgins before. Higgins shot him twice at close range. Charles Stewart, aged 9, was also shot at close range, in the head. Six others were injured. Reid pretended to be dead while Higgins barricaded himself inside the study.

Higgins fired at civilians through the window. Policemen and doctors soon arrived, and police told him to throw the gun out of the window, but instead he opened fire, shooting one of the police after the officer aimed his gun at him through a gap in the door. Higgins eventually did throw his gun out of the window, and was arrested. After his arrest, he was punched in the face by one of the locals. After he was arrested, he was found with a knife and three sticks of explosive gelignite, which would have been enough to destroy the school entirely.

== Aftermath ==
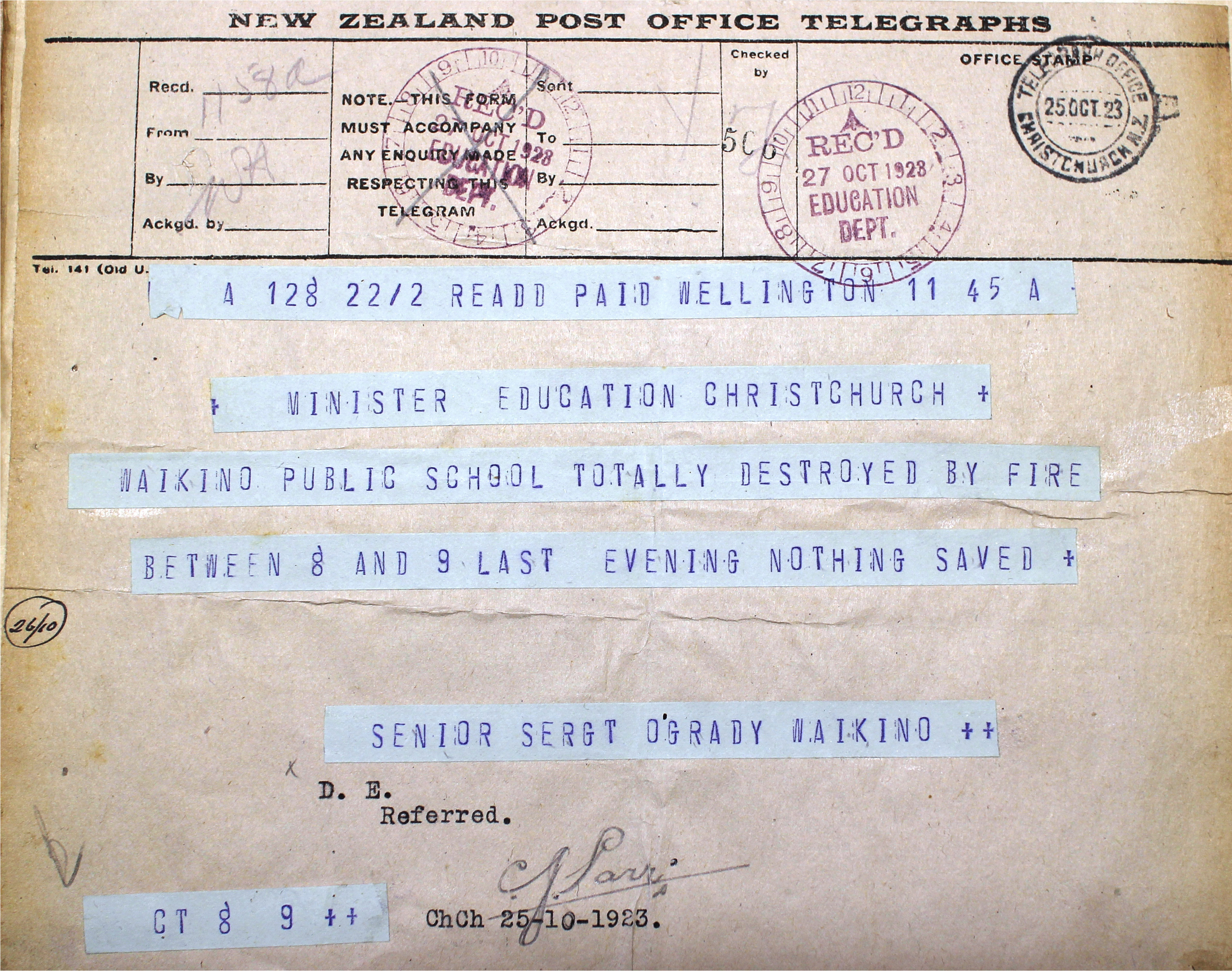
The telegraph announcing the destruction of the school.

The funeral procession for the two victims was one of the largest ever seen in the area. Classes resumed on 5 November, operated out of a local hall. After the shooting, a protest was held on 24 October against the reopening of the school (and the positioning of the school, as it was considered by the locals to be too isolated). During the meeting, someone entered and announced that the school was on fire. By 9 p.m., the school was almost entirely destroyed.

A second Waikino School was built in a different location in 1925. The identities of the people responsible were kept hidden by the community and no one was ever charged or arrested for the fire, though one of the men thought to be involved in the burning of the school later became the caretaker of the second Waikino School, built further down the hill. A report by The New Zealand Herald stated that the arson was thought to be due to the shooting and the location of the school, with some residents stating the day of the shooting that "they would not be sorry if the building were burnt to the ground".

The head of the school, Robert Theodore Reid, was wounded in the shooting and resigned, subsequently being involved in correspondence education. Reid was paralyzed in the right shoulder by his injuries and never taught again, later retiring to Auckland and dying at age 92.

Those injured recovered, though one of the injured victims, Katie McGarry, walked with a limp for the remainder of her life.

Higgins's wife and their two children returned to Canada shortly after his sentence was commuted, with money donated by the public. Higgin's family was not ostracised by the community.

It is the first and only mass school shooting in New Zealand history.

=== Legal proceedings ===
Higgins appeared in court the next day after spending the night in jail. After his court appearance he was sent on a train to Mount Eden jail in Auckland. He claimed he "did not know why" he did it, saying that he "could not help doing it." Higgins was charged with two counts of murder and four of attempted murder on 14 December 1923.

His trial began two months later, and Higgins pleaded not guilty by reason of insanity. Details of Higgins's past behaviour were shared during the trial: he built trapdoors on his property so he could escape if approached, watched his neighbours through telescopes and holes he had cut in his walls, and often locked his son in the house or kept him in the stable with the horse overnight to keep watch.

He was found guilty on 15 February 1924 and sentenced to death. The Crown prosecutor argued that even though Higgins was insane, his insanity did not prevent him from understanding the morality of his actions. He was noted to show no emotion his final day of court, and had no comment after the jury gave its verdict. The court commuted his sentence to life imprisonment less than a month later, after it was decided that he suffered from "chronic delusional insanity".

Higgins died in the Avondale Mental Hospital in Auckland in 1938.
