= Waikino Music Festival =

1977 event in New Zealand

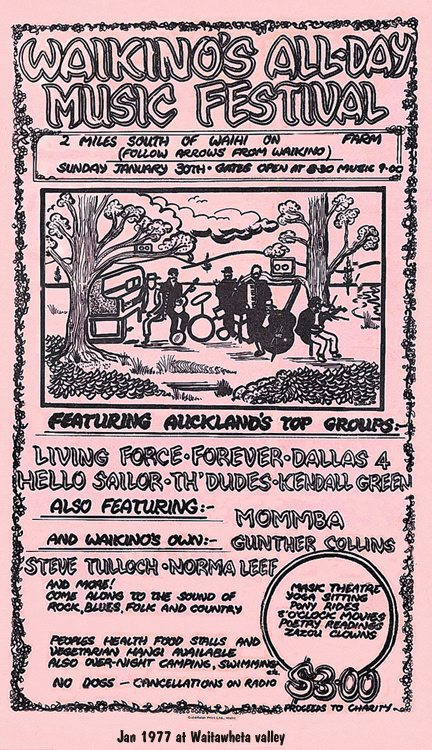
- Artwork Gunther Collins
- Genre: Rock, psychedelic rock
- Locations: Waikino and Waihi, New Zealand
- Years active: 1977
- Attendance: 5,000

Waikino Music Festival was a 1977 music and alternatives event held on Bicknell's farm in the Waitawheta Valley between Waikino and Waihi, New Zealand. Between band set ups; solo artists, poets and storytellers, comedians, yoga demonstrations and ravers would entertain, enabling the show to continue without breaks. These ideas were even further developed at the subsequent Nambassa festivals.

== History ==
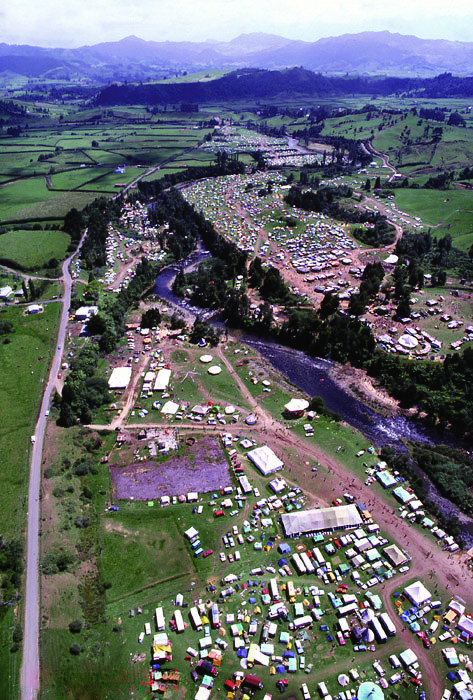
1981 Nambassa Festival at Waitawheta Valley near Waikino, the same location where the Waikino Festival was held.

The event was staged as a forerunner to the Nambassa festivals and was a community project run by Peter Terry. The Waikino festival was originally intended as an eight-hour all day music and cultural event, however, a steady flow of bands, buskers and poets from around Auckland and the Waikato spontaneously rocked up to perform. Consequently, the event ran non stop for 24 hours and attracted 5000 patrons. It took place at Franklin Road, Waitawheta Valley, Hauraki.

The Waikino festival broke new ground for the presentation format of open air concerts, by combining popular rock music and entertainment with cultural based demonstrations. Between band set ups; solo artists, poets and storytellers, comedians, yoga demonstrations and ravers would entertain, enabling the show to continue without breaks. These ideas were even further developed at the subsequent Nambassa festivals.

Proceeds from the Waikino festival went towards the purchase of a winters supply of fuel for the predominantly pensioner community of the sleepy Waikino village. Nambassa later contributed towards the construction of a new Waikino community post office, which was washed away into the Karangahake Gorge during the great 1981 Ohinemuri River floods.

== Entertainment ==
Th' Dudes, Living Force, Hello Sailor (band), Dallas Four, Mommba, Norma Leaf, Steve Tulloch and Charlie Daniels Band. A one-day festival at Waikino. Many of the bands who played Waikino as their first major gig, went on to become national New Zealand music stars. Headlining acts also included spontaneous appearances by the Midge Marsden and the Country Flyers, Rockinghorse, Ragnarok, and Larry Killip's band Starbow.

== See also ==
- List of historic rock festivals
- New Zealand music festivals
- Nambassa
- Waikino
