= Alternative lifestyle =

Lifestyles perceived to be outside the cultural norm

An alternative lifestyle or unconventional lifestyle is a lifestyle perceived to be outside the norm for a given culture. The term alternative lifestyle is often used pejoratively. Description of a related set of activities as alternative is a defining aspect of certain subcultures.

== History ==
Alternative lifestyles and subcultures were first highlighted in the U.S. in the 1920s with the "flapper" movement. Women cut their hair and skirts short (as a symbol of freedom from oppression and the old ways of living). These women were the first large group of females to practice pre-marital sex, dancing, cursing, and driving in modern America without the ostracism that had occurred in earlier instances.

The American press in the 1970s frequently used the term alternative lifestyle as a euphemism for homosexuality out of fear of offending a mass audience. The term was also used to refer to hippies, who were seen as a threat to the social order. Behind the iron curtain, alternative lifestyles were officially considered to be social parasitism, which was a criminal offence in the Soviet Union. Charges were often laid against dissidents and members of the counterculture.

== Examples ==
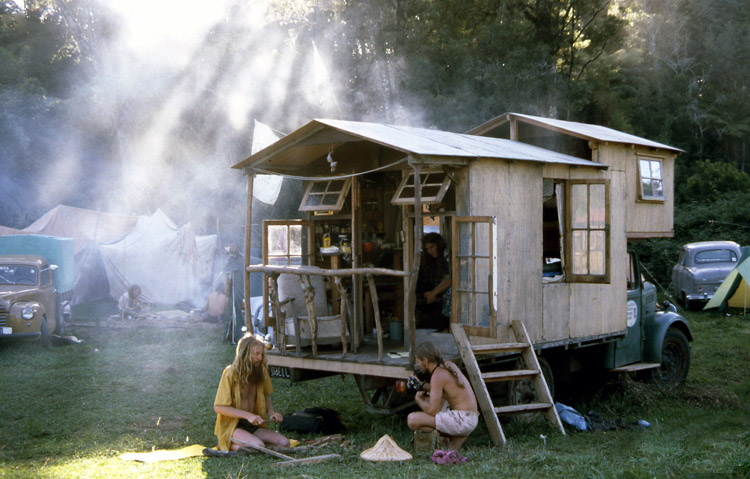
Housetruckers at the 1981 Nambassa five-day festival

The following is a non-exhaustive list of activities that have been described as alternative lifestyles:

- A Stanford University cooperative house, Synergy, was founded in 1972 with the theme of "exploring alternative lifestyles".
- Alternative child-rearing, such as homeschooling, coparenting, and home births
- Environmentally-conscious ways of eating, such as veganism, freeganism, or raw foodism
- Living in non-traditional communities, such as communes, intentional communities, ecovillages, off-the-grid, or the tiny house movement
- Traveling subcultures, including lifestyle travellers, digital nomads, housetruckers, and New Age travellers
- Countercultural movements and alternative subcultures such as Bohemianism, punk rock, emo, metal music subculture, antiquarian steampunk, hippies, and vampires
- Body modification, including tattoos, body piercings, eye tattooing, scarification, non-surgical stretching like ears or genital stretching, and transdermal implants
- Nudism and clothing optional lifestyles
- Homosexual lifestyles and relationships.
- Non-normative sexual lifestyles and gender identity-based subcultures, such as BDSM, LGBT culture, cross-dressing, transvestism, polyamory, cruising, swinging, down-low, and certain types of sexual fetishism, roleplays, or paraphilias
- Adherents to alternative spiritual and religious communities, such as Freemasons, Ordo Templi Orientis, Thelemites, Satanists, Modern Pagans, and New Age communities
- Certain traditional religious minorities, such as Anabaptist Christians (most notably Amish, Mennonites, Hutterites, the Bruderhof Communities, and Schwarzenau Brethren) and ultra-Orthodox Jews, who pursue simple living alongside a non-technological or anti-technology lifestyle
- Secular anti-technology communities called neo-Luddites
- Engagement in artistic pursuits, such as music, visual arts, or performance, often influenced by subcultures like punk, goth, or bohemianism.
- Ethical clothing shopping often with the involvement of sourcing garments through thrifting, exploring garage sales, or even crafting one’s own pieces.

== See also ==
- Alternative culture
- Alternative housing
- Intentional living
- Lebensreform
- Straight edge
- Teetotalism
- Temperance movement
- Underground culture
