= Nambassa =

Festivals held between 1976 and 1981 on large farms in New Zealand

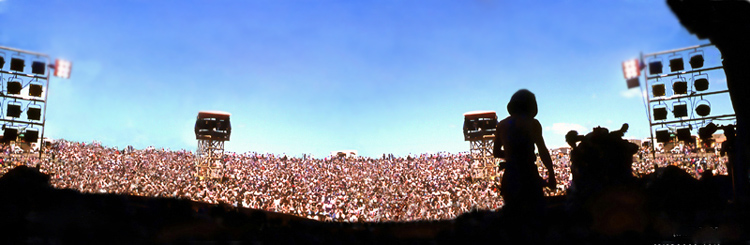
- Chinese dragon dance, mainstage Nambassa Festival 1979
- Genre: Rock music
- Dates: January
- Locations: Waihi and Waikino, Waikato, New Zealand
- Years active: 1976–1981
- Attendance: 75,000+

Nambassa was a series of hippie-conceived New Zealand festivals held from 1976 to 1981 on large farms around Waihi and Waikino in the Waikato. They were music, arts and alternatives festivals that focused on peace, love, and an environmentally friendly lifestyle. In addition to popular entertainment, they featured workshops and displays advocating alternative lifestyle and holistic health issues, alternative medicine, clean and sustainable energy, and unadulterated foods.

The New Zealand hippie movement was part of an international phenomenon in the 1960s and 1970s in the Western world, heralding a new artistic culture of music, freedom and social revolution where millions of young people across the globe were reacting against old world antecedents and embracing a new hippie ethos. Specifically New Zealand's subculture had its foundations in the peace and anti-nuclear activism of the 1960s where hippies were actively trying to stop New Zealand's involvement in the Vietnam war and to prevent the French from testing nuclear weapons at Mururoa atoll in French Polynesia in the Pacific Islands.

The January 1979 three-day music and alternatives festival, held over Auckland anniversary weekend, attracted over 75,000 patrons making it the largest arts, multiple cultural and popular music event of its type in the world.

Nambassa is also the tribal name of a charitable trust that has championed sustainable ideas and demonstrated practical counterculture ideals, a spiritually based alternative lifestyle, environmentalism and green issues from the early 1970s to the present.

== Significant events ==
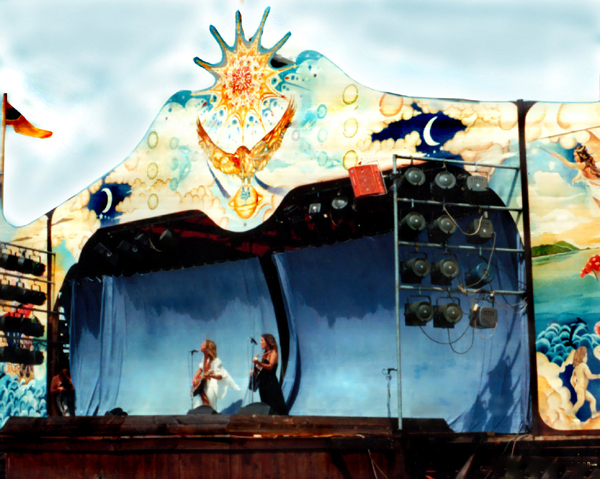
Nambassa 1979 Main Stage, 'Negative Theatre'

- 1977 January. Waikino music festival at Bicknel's farm, Waitawheta Valley, between Waihi and Waikino. Attendance 5500.
- 1977 December. Parade from Queen St, Auckland, to nearby Albert Park for a free concert. Attendance 10,000.
- 1978 January. Nambassa three-day music, crafts and alternative lifestyles festival on Phil and Pat Hulses' 400-acre (1.6 km^{2}) farm in Golden Valley, north of Waihi. Attendance 25,000.
- 1978 October. Nambassa winter road show toured the North Island promoting the 1979 festival.
- 1978 December. Two-day gathering in Maritoto Valley for the Mother Centre and friends. Attendance 1500.
- 1979 January. Nambassa beach festival touring family roadshow – Whangamatā, Waihi Beach, Mount Maunganui and Coromandel.
- 1979 January. Nambassa three-day music, crafts and alternative lifestyles festival on Phil and Pat Hulses' 400-acre (1.6 km^{2}) farm in Golden Valley, north of Waihi. Attendance 75,000 plus.
- 1981 January. Nambassa five-day celebration of music, crafts and alternative lifestyles culture on a 250-acre (1.0 km^{2}) farm at Waitawheta Valley between Waihi and Waikino. Attendance 15,000 – well down on the 1979 festival. Reacting against the huge 1979 event which was deemed by many of the counterculture movement too large and not reflective of the alternative message, the organisers purposely ran this festival on the same weekend as a major commercial rock concert. While this event lost money, it dramatically changed its character away from rock music towards hippie and New Age culture.

== Performers and guests ==
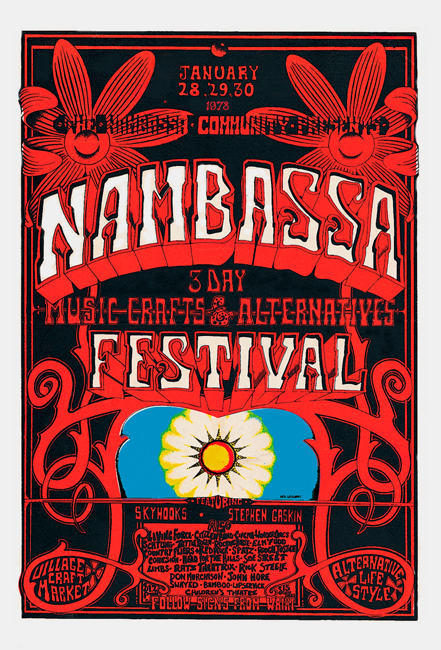
Nambassa Festival 1978, poster

Some of the hundreds of performers and guests who took part in Nambassa activities included:

- Split Enz, Nambassa 1979, relaunching their career with a new line-up.
- The Little River Band, Nambassa 1979, with Glenn Shorrock.
- Skyhooks, Nambassa 1978, like Split Enz, Australia's early developers of theatre rock and costume extravaganza.
- John Mayall, Nambassa 1981. Pioneer of British blues in the 1960s and 1970s.
- Dizzy Gillespie, Nambassa 1981.
- Sonny Terry and Brownie McGhee, Nambassa 1981. Early black American blues exponents who influenced the 1960s music revolution.
- Charlie Daniels, Nambassa 1981.
- Barry McGuire Nambassa 1979. Famous for the 1960s international smash hit "Eve of Destruction".
- Kevin Borich, Nambassa 1981. New Zealander formerly of the La De Da's and an Australian Blues Foundation Hall of Famer.
- Topp Twins, Nambassa 1979 and 1981.
- Limbs Dance Company, Nambassa 1978, 1979 and 1981. Internationally known NZ dance troupe.
- Alan Clay, Nambassa 1979 and 1981. Children's entertainer, author and international arts coordinator.
- Hello Sailor, Waikino 1977.
- Th' Dudes, Waikino 1977. Featuring a youthful Dave Dobbyn, then nurtured by Charlie Gray from the Island of Real café.
- Citizen Band ex Split Enz. Performed Good Morning Citizens.
- Alastair Riddell, Nambassa 1978.
- Midge Marsden, Nambassa 1978 and 1979.
- Beaver, Nambassa 1978.
- Golden Harvest, Nambassa 1979.
- Andy Anderson, Nambassa 1978 and 1979. Musician and actor.

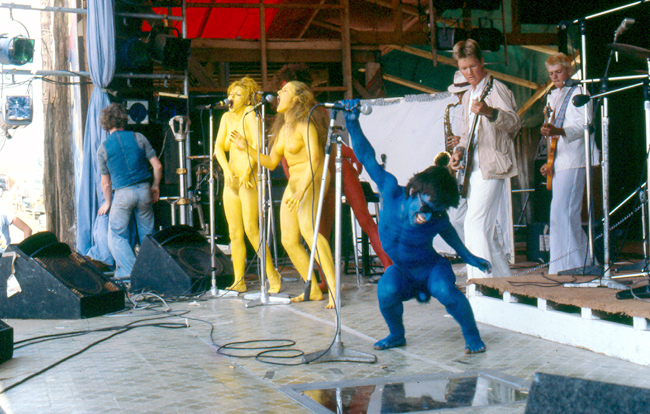
Nambassa 1979, The Plague on the Main Stage

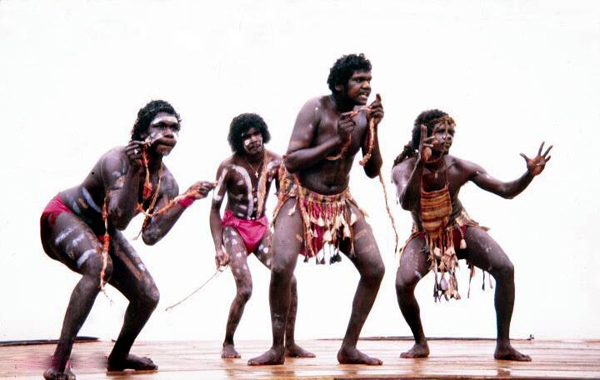
Nambassa 1981 Australian Aboriginal dance

- The Plague, Nambassa 1979 and 1981. Performed naked but covered in paint in 1979.
- Mahana. A travelling Māori theatrical rock band whose rock opera depicts the trials and tribulations of early white colonisation of New Zealand. Showcased at the Nambassa Winter Show 1978 and the Nambassa festivals 1978, 1979 and 1981. Produced by John Tucker.
- Billy TK, Nambassa 1979 and 1981.
- John Hore-Grenell, Nambassa 1978 and 1979.
- The Rodger Fox Big Band, Nambassa 1981.
- Gary McCormick, Nambassa 1978, '79 and '81. Poet and comedian.
- Sam Hunt, Nambassa 1979. Poet.

=== Cultural guests ===
- Stephen Gaskin, Nambassa 1978, 1979 and 1981. Co-founder of "The Farm", an internationally known spiritual community in Summertown, Tennessee. Stephen Gaskin was a Green Party presidential primary candidate in the US elections of 2000. He and wife Ina May Gaskin, plus other farm residents, made the annual pilgrimage to Nambassa.
- Swami Satchidananda, Nambassa 1979. Known among the 1960s counterculture as the man who opened the original Woodstock festival of 1969, and as the sage from India who introduced the art of Yoga to the west.
- Ina May Gaskin, Nambassa 1978 and 1981. Widely credited with having created the modern home birth movement and helping to inspire the renaissance of midwifery in the United States.
- Eileen Caddy Nambassa 1981. Eileen co-founded the Findhorn spiritual community in Scotland in 1962. Her workshops and discussions on Findhorn Foundation were well received.
- Richard Alpert, aka Baba Ram Dass, Nambassa 1981. Richard Alpert was a professor of psychology at Harvard University who became well known for researching the effects of LSD, working closely with Dr. Timothy Leary. At Nambassa there was standing room only for Ram Dass' diverse lecturers on meditation and health.
- Chief Oren Lyons, Nambassa 1981. Lyons is a Native American, a traditional faithkeeper of the Turtle Clan of the Onondaga (tribe) Council of Chiefs of the Hau de no sau nee. He conducted lectures and coordinated with Māori land rights activists, sharing his Native American land rights experiences.
- Jim Cairns, Nambassa 1981. Former deputy Prime Minister of Australia and Labor Treasurer in the Australian government who opposed Australia's involvement in the Vietnam War and in 1970 led a protest against the war. He resigned from parliament in 1977 to devote his life to the counter-cultural movement.
- The Twin Oaks Community eco community from Louisa County, Virginia sent a delegation of six people to the 1981 Nambassa five-day celebration. Their workshop contributions were well received.
- Eva Rickard, Nambassa 1979. Vocal agitator for return of Raglan golf course land to the Tainui Awhiro people from whom it was taken during World War II. Gave a number of powerful lectures, on aerial railway and the main stage. Nambassa is sympathetic towards many indigenous Māori land claims.
- Tim Shadbolt, Nambassa 1978, 1979 and 1981. Political activist and workshop participant. In the 1970s, he founded a commune and concrete cooperative at Huia. He wrote an autobiography, Bullshit and Jellybeans.

== Arts, self-sufficiency and healing arts workshops ==
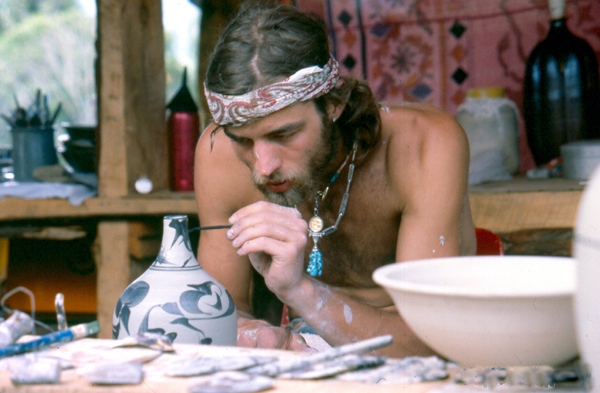
Pottery making in Nambassa

The notion for education-based workshops and displays developed out of a philosophical view; that the world was heading towards difficult times and that people needed to learn how to become more self-sufficient so that they would be less reliant on a system unable to provide spiritual and survivalist needs.

Humanity has become a cold, hard crust upon the face of the earth through which nothing can pass. At the moment we are doing this planet no good.

The earth creates us out of herself and of herself. We are the very flower of all her produce and she makes us for a very special purpose. That purpose which we are not fulfilling is to feed back into the earth through ourselves that 'Nectar' from the gods out there.

The earth is starving and dying for want of spirit food. Great powers of this food are drawn when all hearts come together in joy, relaxed happiness and nature- like conditions, enhanced by singing, music and above all love.

This festival is unique from its very inception.

It is willed through godliness. At this special time, on this special place, the Eden of New Zealand, the earth will be momentarily replenished.

Miracle conditions will be created so that spirit can, and will, flow threw the hearts of this angelic generation in order to 'Christ' the earth. This is one of the great duties of humankind, what his people are about to do, in the heart centre of 'NAMBASSA' . ... New Zealand. ... .'

— 1976 Peter Terry.,

The following extracts are taken from the first 1976 "Nambassa Sun" newsletter proposal, in support of their survivalist workshops on self sufficiency and to heal the body and the mind.

There can be no doubt we are living in confusing times. The social pressures alone are enough to start one thinking about living an alternative lifestyle. Already many people are leaving the cities to live on the land, simply because they can no longer afford the costs of urban life.

Let us take a look at city life, the frantic rush and bustle on the streets, all that traffic and factories with all their pollution, noise and waste, and cynical exploitation by big business. And where are you? In the midst of the frenzied grime, paying high rent or struggling to cope with mortgage payments. Food and heating costs have rocketed, and we know they can only go up. You are working as many hours as you can to pay for city life, with little time for leisure, even less time to get to know your children, or to spend a few days with friends. Altogether it's a vicious circle, a struggle for survival, with no time to think and be oneself. No wonder that crime is on the increase and mental institutions are overcrowded. If you haven't fallen victim to one of these social ills, then you could be facing a coronary in your efforts to maintain the pace.

We are using up our natural resources at an ever increasing rate and they are not going to last for ever. In fact we are abusing our planet woefully. Mother earth will not tolerate this continued rape, and is groaning under the burden of unenlightened man. Consider this and ask yourself, "Is this a natural way of life, is this how we were meant to live?" In all truth we have entered a depression, and are fast reaching a stage, not only of economic collapse, but a point where our very survival is threatened. Now, more than ever before, there is a need and a growing desire for people to learn to live outside the collapsing economic and social system, with its greed and avarice, and it's denial of individuality.

— 1976 Peter Terry.

The Nambassa festivals were not only music and entertainment events but included educational components which sought to instruct people on lifestyle aids it felt important enough to promote within the then conservative society of New Zealand's 1970s. Many of those involved in Nambassa aspired to the notion that throughout the evolution of western civilisation, many valuable ancient survival, healing and spiritual techniques, had been lost over 1700 years of a philosophically and culturally dominating Roman Christianity. Nambassa advocates that many past civilisations supporting religious and political institutions, have historically sought to alienate, and too often violently eliminate, many worthwhile belief systems which did not conform to its then strict conservative doctrines on culture and religion. Adherents of Nambassa promote the ideology which suggests that, to deny what was once integral to survival in ancient history, is essentially to deny one's personal spiritual development. Through its wide variety of workshop subjects, the festivals attempted to nurture a better understanding of culture and spirituality with the goal of fostering a more tolerant and better informed society.

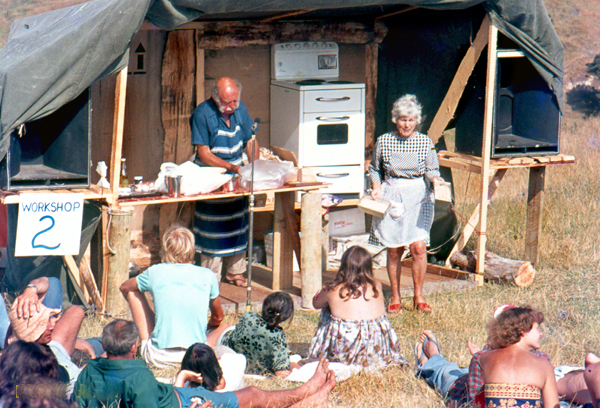
A health workshop at Nambassa 1978

The idea of integrating education based workshop demonstrations with popular mainstream entertainment, set the Nambassa festivals aside from other festivals coming before it. It was during the social revolution of the early 1960s and 1970s that Nambassa pioneered the concept, and was a world leader, in what was to evolve as a new format of presentation for the all encompassing major cultural, creative arts and music festivals. Most large open-air entertainment gatherings, prior to Nambassa, were essentially pop concerts. This new format demonstrated the merits of combining, in a complementary way, multiple and diverse entertainment and cultural modules, within the one grand celebratory event. During the 1970s, the Nambassa Trust developed this concept of large scale multidimensional events, which the rest of the world only began adopting some 20 years later.

While the 1960s and 1970s hippy movements were, and continue to be, unfairly derided for their infatuation with rediscovering ancient religion and culture, many of these re-birthing systems are now part of mainstream ideology.

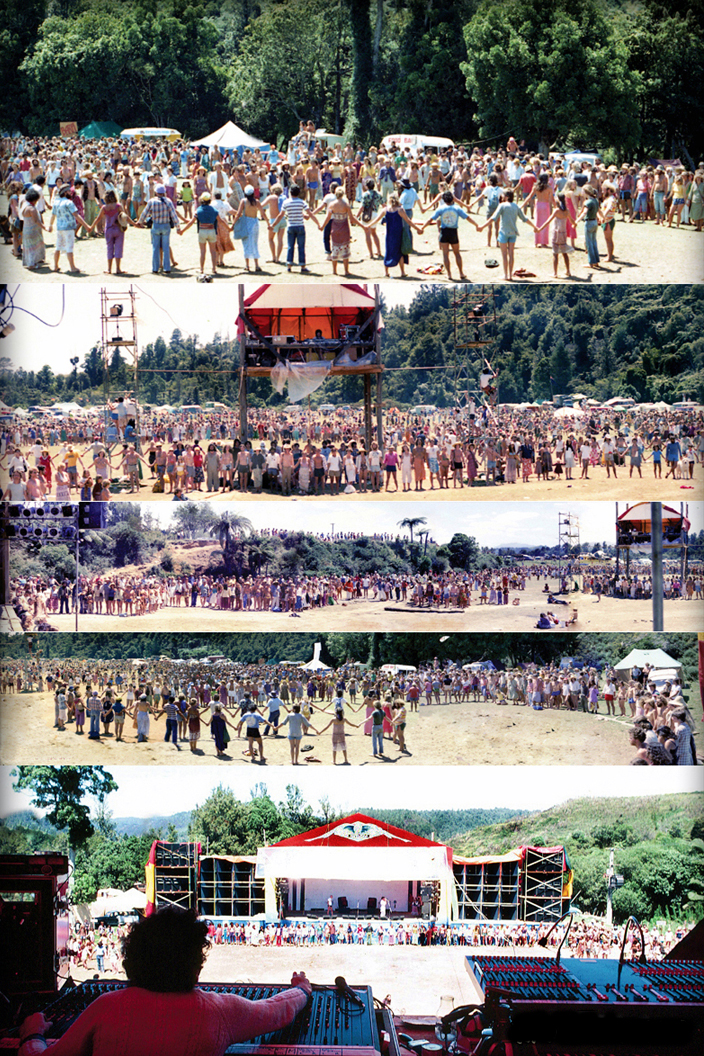
1981 10,000 Nambassadors join for world peace

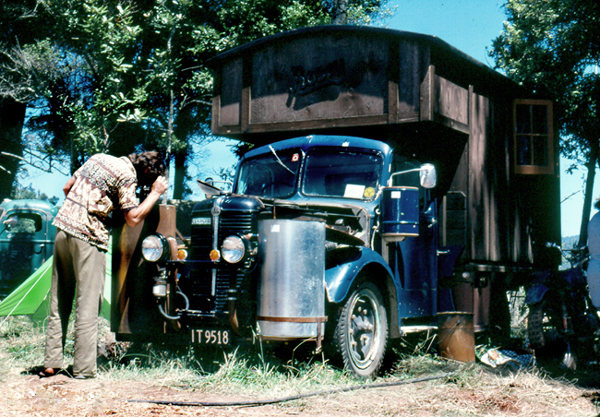
Nambassa 1981, a wood gas producer at the Alternative Energy Centre.

At Nambassa, one could attend and participate in free workshop demonstrations, symposium and discussion groups on diverse subjects such as: leather-work, hand crafted jewellery, spinning (textiles), pottery, indigenous Australians didgeridoo, boomerang throwing, creative art, musical instruments, puppeteering, bonsai trees, batiking, screen printing, basket weaving, Māori woodcarving, furniture and woodturning, natural cosmetics, custom made Sandal (footwear), clay therapy, aboriginal emu egg carving, silk screening, crochet and embroidery, macramé, ceramics, bone carving, candle making, stained glass, paper making, journalism and printing, glass blowing, enamelling, Māori art and jewellery, wood carving, the art of throwing pottery, weaving on inkle and back strap looms, wood-adzing, moccasin making, airbrushing, organic gardening, tie-dye, Māori kit making, mulching and composting, growing and using soya beans, herb gardening, hydroponics, small orcharding, natural child birth, breast feeding, child care, alternative education, animal husbandry, raku pottery, fencing, small dams and irrigation, solar heating, methane gas plants, wind pumps and generators, solar power, solar cooker, waterwheels, goat farming, sheep milking, rammed earth walls, soil-cement adobe, stone-masonry, hydraulic power, wind power, low cost housing and renovation, furniture making, moulds and mud houses, bamboo and its uses, alternative lifestyles and communities, Rudolf Steiner Schools, permaculture, ecology and mining, native forests, saving the whales, food preparation and storage, dried fruit, bread making, self-sufficiency, wine making, beekeeping, butter and cheese making, soap making, food cooperatives, healthy eating, civil liberties, New Zealand's nuclear-free zone, world peace and disarmament, music, Gay Rights, puppetry, origami, theatre, dance and costumes, mask making, conservation and pesticides, clean water, mobile homes construction, bush craft, legal aspects of alternative land development, horse ploughing, family planning, vegetarianism, animal rights, martial arts, Third World poverty, civil and human rights, work cooperatives, craft cooperatives, wood gas producers, solar panels, development of electric cars and bikes, Feminism, Women's Rights, amateur radio, wood stoves and wetbacks, kite making, the environment (Greenpeace and Friends of the Earth), alternative education, Pacific cultural exchange (Pacific Islander), Māori land rights, community development, Māori marae, Māori hāngī, Maori Language Tutorial, substance abuse, new age and green politics, alternative media, meditation, yoga, sufi dancing, I Ching, tarot cards, alchemy, massage, sweat lodge, nutrition, alternative medicine, astrology, prayer and chanting, clairvoyance, meditation, spiritual healing, naturopathy, acupuncture, tai chi, herbalism, natural remedies, reflexology, iridology and osteopathy.

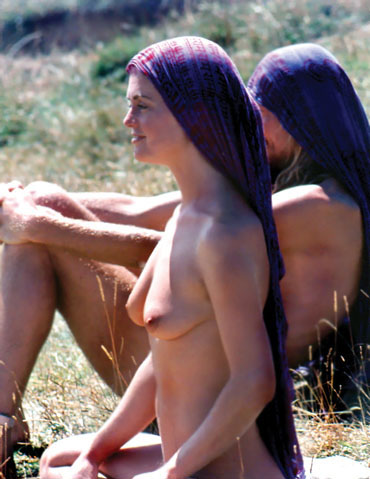
People of Nambassa 1978

At all festivals there was a smorgasbord of spiritual and religious learning. Here the public could venture to various Healing Arts areas and attend either a bible study course, or chant spiritual names with the Buddhists and Hare Krishnas, or sing and pray with Christians, or attend Sunday mass with the Catholics or learn how to meditate with Ananda Marga or find out the meaning of Karma from the Hindus. The policy of the Nambassa Trust was to attempt to create an ambiance which would dispel all religious factionalism, so that philosophical labels could dissipate enabling people of all religious persuasion to share in their most common fundamental of traits, their humanity. In maintaining Nambassa's nonsectarian and open door policy on religious philosophy, workshops were conducted on: Hinduism, Hare Krishna, Bible scholarship and born again Christianity, Roman Catholic Church, Judaism, Ananda Marga, Buddhism, Taoism, Islam, Krishna-Haribol, Sufism, Esoteric Christianity, shamanism, Wicca, and Zen.

== Village market ==
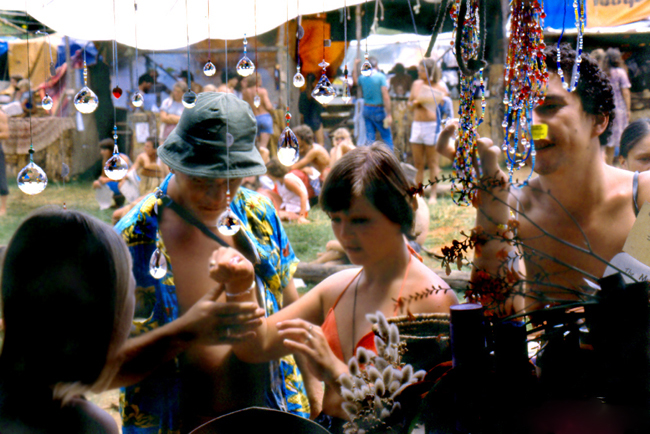
Nambassa 1981 Village Marketplace.

At the centre of all Nambassa festivals lay the village marketplaces. These consisted of dozens of hand craft outlets and health food eateries. These centers of community are where one found the main information centre or where folks simply culminated just to absorb the diverse quirky celebratory ambiance. Over the various festivals the marketplaces evolved and became major attractions in themselves. Not only a space for the enjoyment of bartering for various products , but they were a place of fun and entertainment, spontaneous or otherwise.

The 1981 festival village was designed around a central rotunda with a maypole, where spontaneously, poets, buskers and ravers alike featured. Nambassa vigorously promoted handcrafts, not only because of their therapeutic qualities, but because they had the potential to be a source of revenue to lifestyle proponents looking towards self-sufficiency and economic independence. From the festival village one could attend any number of craft workshops, pick up a copy of the daily Nambassa Waves newspaper, go buy fresh bread cooked in the wood-fired oven bakery constructed in a converted hay shed, go do some shopping, check out Radio Nambassaland, pick up some information from the mother centre, or just simply chill out and absorb the atmosphere.

== Personnel ==
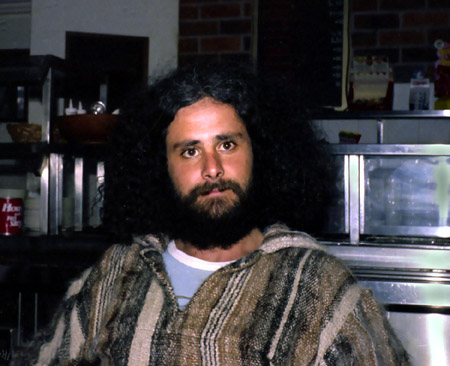
1978 Peter Terry, Nambassa founder and events coordinator.

The multiple festival format which combined Creative Arts, popular music and multiculturalism that shaped the Nambassa festivals, was conceived by Peter Terry while living in the Waikino craft village during early 1976. January 1977 heralded the Waikino music festival, a prelude to Nambassa, which experimented with the concept of amalgamating into a singular festive event, controversial alternative culture with popular music. By February 1977 Lorraine Ward and Bernard Woods in an old restored farmhouse atop of rural Bulltown Rd in Waihi, assisted Terry to edit a blueprint for the Nambassa Trust and the first festival. The first Nambassa newsletter proposal was printed, ten thousand copies of a free 13-page manuscript outlining the model and need for a Nambassa event, were circulated among the music, arts and alternative communities throughout the nation, inviting the wider community to participate. The first Mother Centre was opened on a farm in Willow Road at Waihi early November 1977, where the initial Nambassa support base and volunteers assembled to construct the festival facilities to accommodate a small city for the planned three-day music, crafts and alternative lifestyle event which was to be held at the end of January 1978 on two farms at the end of Landlyst Waihi.

The Nambassa administration involved hundreds, to the extent that the 1981 five-day celebration gave out 1500 complimentary tickets to people and groups involved in the event in some official capacity. Those mainly responsible were: Peter Terry (Nambassa trustee, founder and events coordinator 1976–2005), Lorraine Ward (Nambassa secretary and trustee 1977–2005), Neil Wernham (art and graphics 1977–1981), Doug Rogers (music and staging technical adviser, 1976–1979), Fred Alder (Nambassa sun coordinator 1979, 1978 construction team, and former trustee 1978 and 1979), Bryce Lelievre (1981 festival secretary), Mike Taylor (communications and site coordinator 1978 and 1979), Jonathon Acorn (1981 Woozlebub coordinator), Chris Hegan (main stage manager), Murray Grey (assistant stage manager), Trevor Kotlowski (1981 goffa), Mike Colonna (children's facility coordinator 1978 and 1979), Colin Broadley (programing, Nambassa book coordinator and open-air theatre 1979–1981) and Barry Lowther, (Mother Centre father, 1978 and 1979).

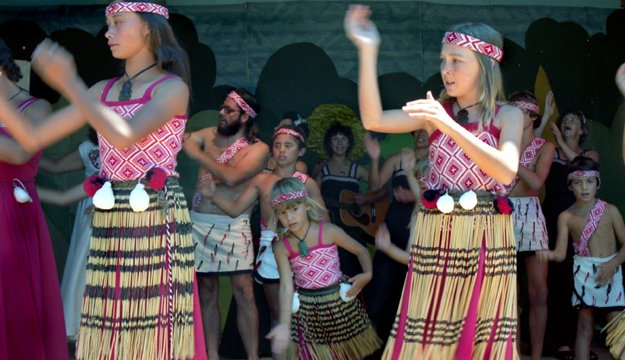
1981 Māori culture group.

The organising of the festivals and supporting events were themselves practical workshops in every sense. The Nambassa spectacles were organised on a purely voluntary basis by energetic and visionary young unemployed hippies (at a time when New Zealand's unemployment rate was at an unprecedented high), coordinated into a cohesive working force by Terry. Three months out of each festival its supporters would assemble at a farm community called the "Mother Centre", living in house trucks, vans, cars and tents. Nambassa's open door policy encouraged anyone of whatever race, creed or economic circumstance to join in, providing one met the basic rules of the Mother Centre camp. The guidelines were no alcohol or hard drugs, and vegetarian diet was supplied by the Trust. Participants were required to work each day towards the collective goal of preparing the festival in time for opening day. In exchange they were fed and had immediate needs catered for. Over the years thousands of people, young and old, carved out permanent careers from the inspiration learnt, just from being involved with or going to a Nambassa event.

Nambassa is administered not by private enterprise but through a registered charitable trust whose articles list provisions and aims allowing it to organise public events to raise funds to meet objectives. Consequently, the organisation is nurtured by and for the people, as opposed to being driven by corporate interests looking to maximise profit. This effectively enabled the events organisers to set minimal entry fees, based upon projected profits, so that festivals were affordable to lower income people. For example, the 1979 festival entrance was $18 (pre-paid) for a three-day adult pass. The trustees have several times declined offers of corporate sponsorship because the products offered have not met the Trust's philosophical aims and objects. In the 1970s the Nambassa Trust donated $29,698 to other organisations which meet its criteria. All Nambassa events made a profit with the exception of Celebration 1981.

== Sound and lighting ==
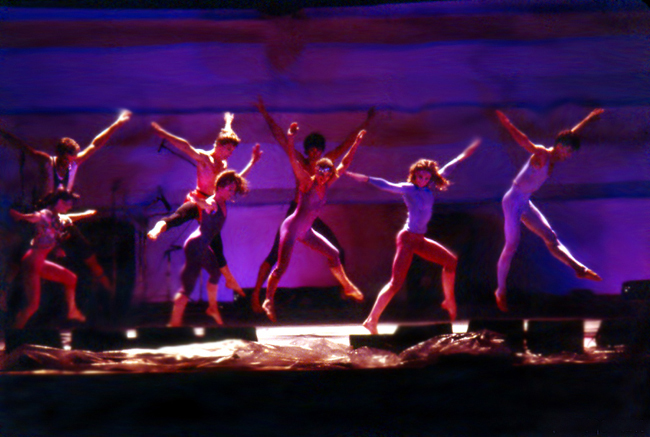
1981 'Limbs Dance' on Redhat.

Nambassa significantly expanded the concept of multiple open air staging, all running simultaneously at the one event. Out of the first 1978 three-day festival, the requirement of a second stage grew from the need to expand the entertainment program because of the resounding feedback from local performers and artists wanting to play at Nambassa. This became the "Aerial Railway", a second fully operational stage with sound, lighting and management. Aerial Railway absorbed the overflow of performers from the Main Stage, and also acted as a venue for spontaneous performances or raves. This second option was integral to the Nambassa philosophy of promoting local music and arts. Although the Miami Pop Festival in December 1968 featured two simultaneous 'main' stages, most of the early U.S. and European rock festivals, including Woodstock festival, Monterey Pop Festival and Isle of Wight Festival were predominantly single stage productions. The Nambassa 1978 festival had three stages; 1979 saw this expanded to four (including workshop stages), and the 1981 5-day celebration heralded five separate sound and lighting venues, all running at the same time. In 1981, "Aerial Railway" was replaced with the "Open Air Theatre" and "Woozlebub" for children. The multiple staging concepts seem to be finally making a comeback in the 21st century as seen at the recent Big Day Out and Glastonbury festivals.

The 1981 Nambassa 5-day event introduced "Radio Nambassaland". This broadcast live feeds from all the 5 stages and workshops, into the surrounding community.

== Interesting occurrences from the Nambassa festivals ==
- On a per-capita basis, the 1979 Nambassa festival was over 10 times bigger than the famous 1969 Woodstock Festival. Swami Satchidananda, who also opened Woodstock ten years previously said, "This is better than Woodstock- you've got it made, lead the world".
- As Nambassa sought to demonstrate the practical ideals of alternative lifestyle, alcohol and meat could not be purchased at any Nambassa event. However, festival patrons were welcome to bring their own if they so desired.
- On the Friday night before the 1979 festival was officially opened, the festival
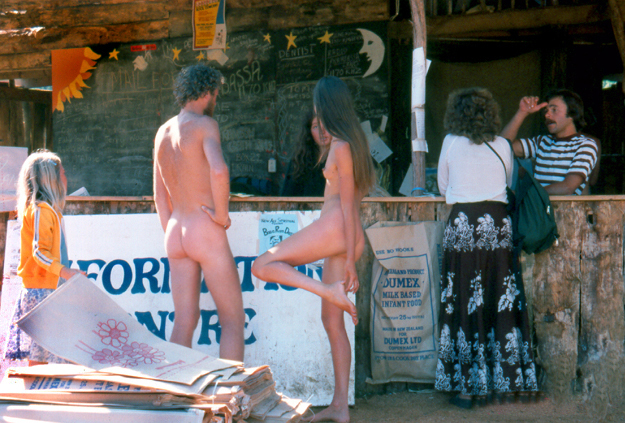
  1981 Nambassa Village Market
  attendance had already reached its maximum capacity. At 3 am Saturday morning Peter was on the phone negotiating paddocks from neighbouring farms, while Fred, Mike and Bernie were out in the dead of night with bolt cutters, removing fences to allow cars and campers into newly acquired festival acreage. By 11 am Saturday morning on opening day, the traffic police closed the festival, and were telling people to go home, announcing on radio that the event could accommodate no more patrons. They ordered the organisers to remove the entry gates to free the roads, as vehicles and pedestrians were banked up in all directions for some 20 kilometres. But still they arrived. Some 5 kilometres towards Waihi a tent city spontaneously arose on a neighbouring farm where approximately 15,000 people parked and then walked the final leg into the festival site. Others abandoned their vehicles in Waihi itself and made the pilgrimage to Nambassa on foot.
- Nudity was a factor at all Nambassa festivals. In an atmosphere of openness and compelling spiritual flow, a sense of personal freedom and discovery prevailed and this led to a considerable amount of nudity in the most innocent sense. Thousands of people simply got naked and wandered the festivals with little or no clothing.
- Due to post 1978 festival intimidation by the media concerning the public smoking of marijuana at Nambassa, and whether the police were going to act on it in 1979, 58 people were arrested for cannabis on the first day of Nambassa 1979. As a response, tens of thousands of festival goers marched up the hill of the main auditorium to the police compound, threatening to storm it if the arrests did not cease. Festival organiser Peter Terry arranged a meeting with the police principals and advised them that they had made their point. He told the police that they themselves had become the focus of disruption, threatening the peaceful outcome of the event. He advised the police that if the arrests continued then he too would join the civil disobedience campaign to have them removed from the festival site. The police discontinued their arrest policy. Peter Terry was advised that the New Zealand Defence Force had been placed on standby as a precaution to any further protest directed at the police.
- Just a month out of the 1981 5-day celebration at Waitawheta Valley, the Ohinemuri Council sought, and were granted, a legal injunction which effectively cancelled the festival. This resulted from objections to the event from local Waitawheta farmers. Once the red tape and bureaucracy was negotiated to everyone's satisfaction, the injunction was lifted.
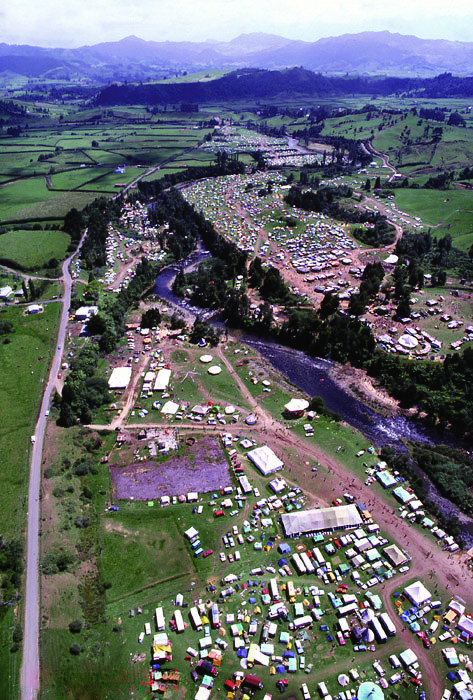
  1981 Nambassa Festival at Waitawheta Valley near Waikino
- The 1978 campaign to bring Split Enz home from England to play Nambassa 1979, was initially fraught with all kinds of complications. No one, including Michael Gudinski and his Mushroom Records label, (Split Enz record company), would back the venture because the band had not fared overly well in the UK and had undergone significant member changes. After talks between Nambassa and Mushroom, (Peter Terry flew to Melbourne in an attempt to negotiate a deal), Michael Gudinski declined to assist financially with the proposed Nambassa venture. He said Mushroom had already lost considerable money on the band's UK adventure and was not in a position to invest further in their future. Gudinski, who Nambassa had dealt with the previous year with Skyhooks, instead offered a compromise without Split Enz, involving top Australian bands eager to play Nambassa. This was rejected by Nambassa organisers. The Trust wanted Split Enz, who they considered to be integral to the NZ music scene, or nothing. Nambassa eventually decided to negotiate directly with the band itself and ultimately financed the band's return. Split Enz performed for free at Nambassa 1979, forgoing their appearance fee so that they could return to New Zealand. In an eleventh hour deal Mushroom agreed to take the band from Nambassa and tour Australia, after which Mushroom Records subsequently released their hit single "I See Red" to coincide with their Nambassa appearance. When Split Enz played at 8.30 pm on Saturday night on 28 January 1979, their professional performance was widely regarded as having heralded a new and unprecedented era for the new band.
- Due to the huge volume of people who attended the Nambassa 3-day festival in 1979, the organisers were unable to get an accurate census of attendees, but have given estimates of 75,000 people. Some segments of the media, including Television New Zealand who were regularly flying over the festival, were quoting estimates as high as 150,000 people. This event became a free concert, because the police, unable to control the large volume of traffic which had closed all roads in a 20 kilometre radius, officially closed the event down mid-morning of the first day.

== The Nambassa Winter Show with Mahana ==
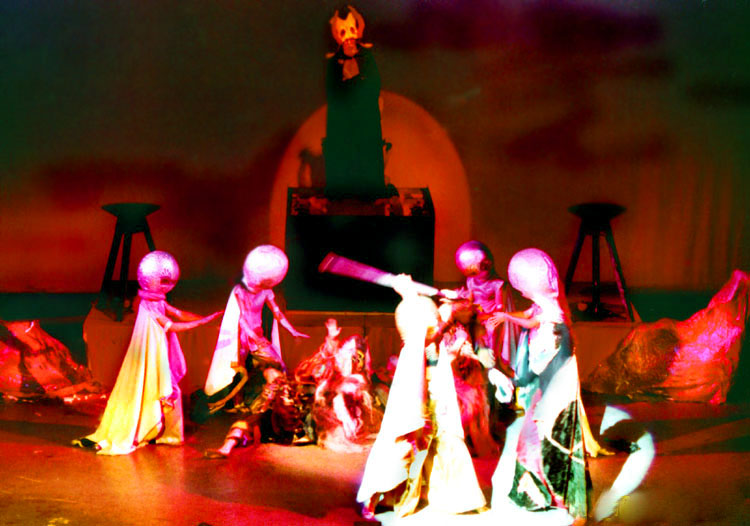
Space Angels in the 'Return of the Ancients', 1978 Nambassa Winter Show.

The Nambassa Winter Show with Mahana was a musical theatrical production of 60 entertainers and crew who toured the North Island of New Zealand in a convoy of Mobile homes, buses and vans, performing at major centres and theatres throughout September and October 1978. While initially 4 main shows were scheduled for this collective theatre company, repeat and spontaneous performances around the nation saw this number of live performances increased to over 10. This theatrical extravaganza was organised by the Nambassa Trust as part of its national promotion of the arts and towards promoting its 1979 3-day music, crafts and Alternative lifestyle festival which was held in Waihi attracting 70,000 people.

== New Zealand's Housetruckers of the 1970s ==
Housetruckers are individuals, families and groups who convert old trucks and school buses into mobile-homes and live in them, preferring an unattached and transient gypsy lifestyle to more conventional housing. These unique vehicles began appearing around New Zealand during the mid-1970s and even though there are fewer today they continue to adorn NZ roads.

== Sources ==
Nambassa is a registered Trademark

=== Film ===
Nambassa Festival, a two-hour musical film documentary which had five crews working on it, New Zealand, 1980 The New Zealand Film Archive / Ngā Kaitiaki O Ngā Taonga Whitiāhua The film (50-minute version) was part of the New Zealand Film Commissions entry to the 1980 Cannes Film Festival. Director/editor, Philip Howe. Production company: Nambassa Trust, Peter Terry and Dale Farnsworth.

=== Radio ===
"Enzology" Frenzy (1978–1979). Episode 5 of Radio New Zealand National's story of Split Enz. Frenzy (duration: 49′55″).

=== Album ===
A double album made up of music, raves and comedy was recorded live from the main stage of the 1979 event and released throughout New Zealand as "Festival Music" (Stetson Records, 2SRLP12). This vinyl release featured Split Enz, Living Force, Flight 77, Chapman and White, Mahana, John Hore, Steve Tulloch, Plague, Chris Thompson, Schtung, Rick Steel, Tribrations, Nevil Purvis, Satchidananda, Gary McCormick, Andy Anderson. It was produced by Peter Terry, and re-recorded and mixed by Peter MacInnes and Dave Hurley at Mandrill Studios, Auckland NZ.

=== Publications ===
- Nambassa: A New Direction, edited by Colin Broadley and Judith Jones, A. H. & A. W. Reed, 1979. It records the huge three-day 1979 festival, with its 137 pages, 18 pages of full colour and 200 B&W photo images. Nambassa: Judith Jones: Source link. ISBN 0-589-01216-9.
- Nambassa Festival Newsletter 1 edited by Peter Terry, Lorraine Ward and Bernard Woods. Published in 1976, 1977 and printed by Goldfields Press Ltd, Paeroa.
- The Nambassa Sun and the Nambassa Waves newspapers published quarterly 1978–1981. Archived at the Alexander Turnbull Library
- The Aotearoa Digital Arts Reader published by Aotearoa Digital Arts and Clouds ISBN 978-0-9582789-9-7
- The Wong Way to Marry , by C. A. Poulter. ISBN 1-921362-25-1
- Art New Zealand Road People of Aetearoa by Andrew Martin.
- The 1960s Cultural Revolution by John C. McWilliams ISBN 0-313-29913-7 ISBN 978-0-313-29913-1
- The Dark Side of Christian History by Helen Ellerbe ISBN 0-9644873-4-9 (1995)
- History of the Inquisition of the Middle Ages Henry Charles Lea (New York, 1888)

== See also ==
- List of historic rock festivals
- Nambassa Winter Show with Mahana
- New Zealand's Housetruckers of the 1970s
- Waikino music festival
- ConFest
- Waikino
- Ohu
- Ecovillage
- Back-to-the-land movement
- Permaculture
- Green politics
- Nuclear-free zone – New Zealand
- Holistic health
- Alternative medicine
