= Waikino =

Settlement in Waikato, New Zealand

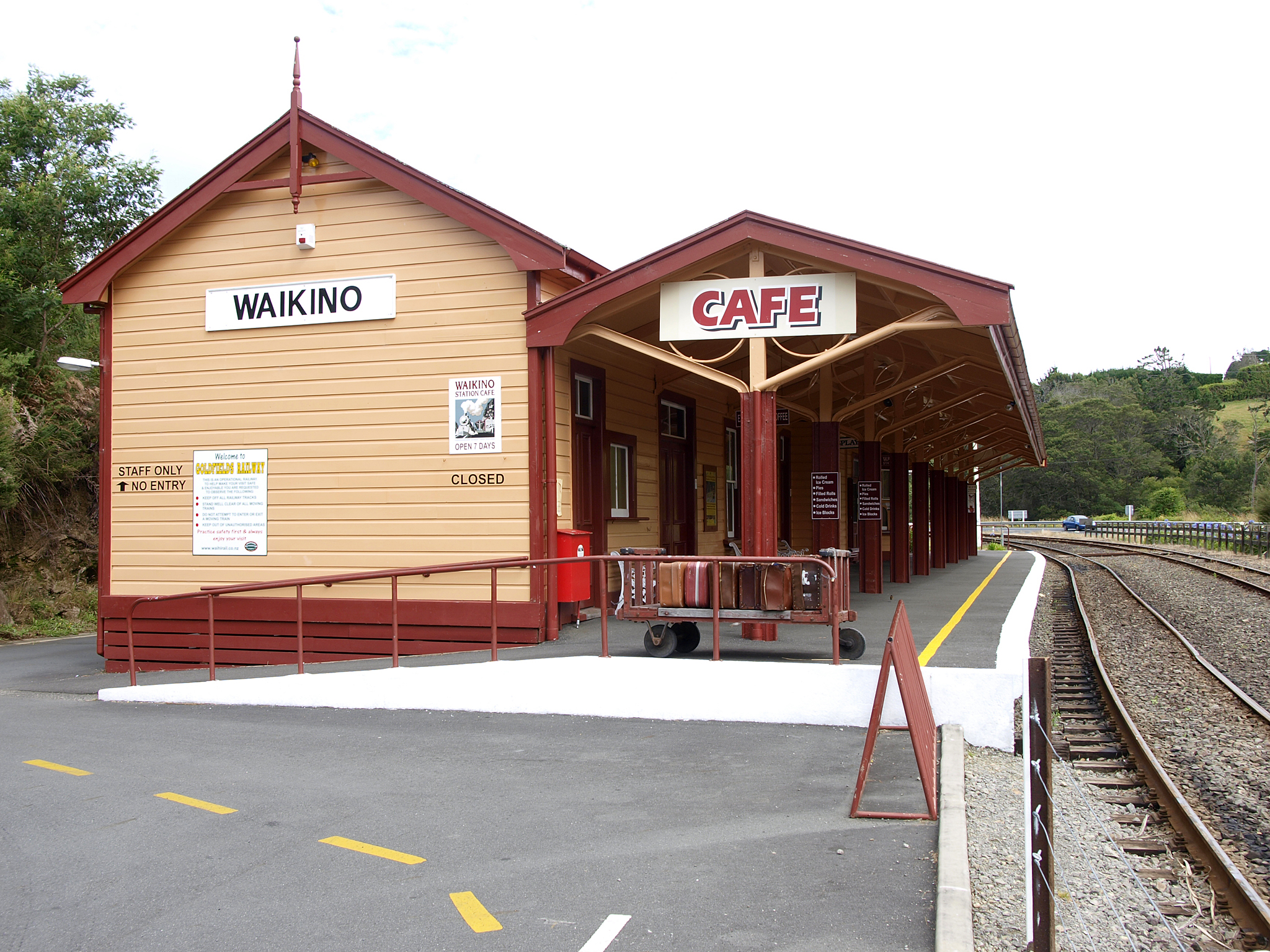
- Waikino Railway Station and Cafe
- Interactive map of Waikino
- Coordinates: 37.413°S 175.772°E
- Country: New Zealand
- Region: Waikato region
- District: Hauraki District
- Ward: Waihi Ward
- Electorates: Coromandel; Hauraki-Waikato (Māori)

Government
  - Territorial Authority: Hauraki District Council
  - Regional council: Waikato Regional Council
  - Mayor of Thames-Coromandel: Peter Revell
  - Coromandel MP: Scott Simpson
  - Hauraki-Waikato MP: Hana-Rawhiti Maipi-Clarke

Area
  - Total: 1.75 km^{2} (0.68 sq mi)

Population (June 2025)
  - Total: 320
  - Density: 180/km^{2} (470/sq mi)

Waikino is a small settlement at the eastern end of a gorge in the North Island of New Zealand alongside the Ohinemuri River, between Waihi and the Karangahake Gorge. The Waikino district lies at the base of the ecologically sensitive Coromandel Peninsula with its subtropical rainforests, steep ravines and fast moving rivers and streams. The cascades of the Owharoa Falls lie just to the south west of the settlement.

The New Zealand Ministry for Culture and Heritage gives a translation of "harmful waters" for Waikino.

The population of Waikino was 213 people in 90 households in the 2013 New Zealand census.

== History ==
Gold mining around Waikino has a history dating back to early colonisation of New Zealand. Waikino was the focal point of gold mining in the Waikato-Bay of Plenty district with the 1897 construction of the Victoria Battery on the edge of what was a busy town supporting the extensive local mining industry. Waikino's Victoria Battery processed ore from the large Martha Mine in Waihi. The Victoria Battery was then New Zealand's largest industrial complex. Besides processing ore, it supported carpenters' shops, a sawmill and a foundry. With 200 stamps, the battery was the largest quartz crushing plant for gold extraction in Australasia, and was capable of crushing over 812 tonnes of ore each day to the consistency of sand. The loud thumping sounds of crushing rock could be heard 10 kilometres away.

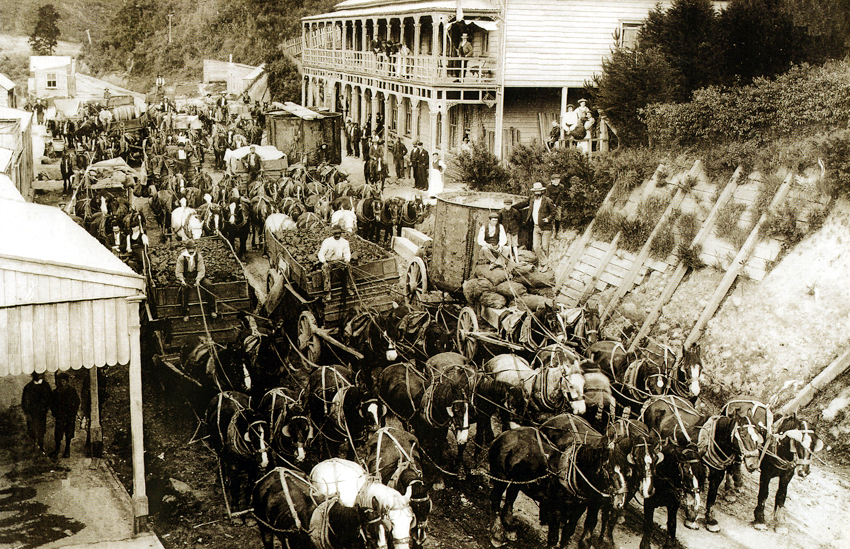
The Waikino Express 1889

Five kilometres up the road behind Waikino, once existed the mining town of Waitekauri, near Golden Cross. The town was demolished at the end of that era's gold rush, consequently the village reverted to farmland. The local Waitekauri pub, the historic two storeyed "Golden Cross Hotel", was later transported to Waihi.

On 19 October 1923, the Waikino school shooting occurred at Waikino School, claiming the lives of two students, Kelvin McLean, aged 13, and Charles Stewart, aged 9. This remains New Zealand's only school shooting. The gunman, John Christopher Higgins, was convicted of murder and sentenced to death. The death sentence was commuted to life imprisonment. Higgins later had his conviction quashed, on the grounds of insanity.

When gold became uneconomic to mine after World War II, Waikino residents lost their economic base and many left. The small retail business community in Waikino's main street endured until the late 1950s.

The town's population began to grow again in the 1970s, drawn by the cheap housing and the scenery. It became something of a centre hippies and crafts people. The counterculture people purchased many of the old houses, converting some into small craft workshops and retail outlets.

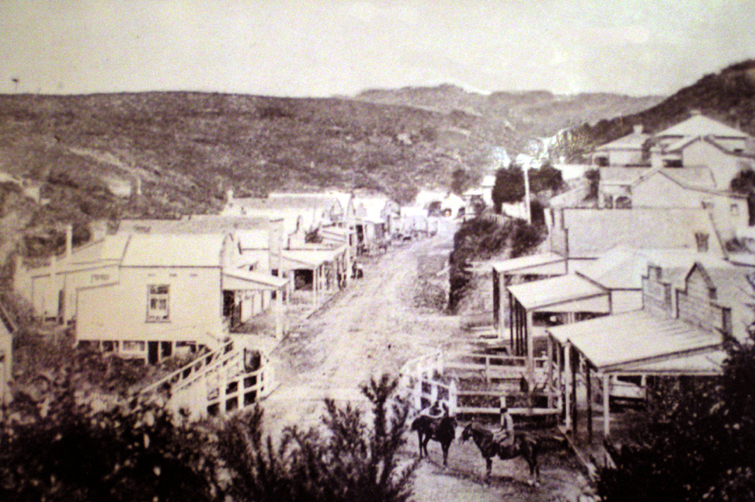
Waikino Village in the 1870s

The main highway (State Highway 2) retail shops which traversed the beautiful Ohinemuri river before it plunged into the Karangahake Gorge had its old shops and Lodge Hall refurbished and reopened from this influx of young alternative lifestyle people moving away from cities. Quickly, flourishing cottage industry crafts and health food outlets grew around Waikino, servicing the local village and Coromandel. Once again, the former ghost town, having been closed down for some time, became the focal meeting point of the community. The business strip reinvigorated, people returned to town to do business. Hundreds of tourists, drawn by the quirky hippies atmosphere, stopped at Waikino's main highway shops every week to try homemade foods at the tea rooms, and to purchase locally made Arts and crafts.

January 1977 saw the community supporting the Waikino music festival of rock, blues and culture, held on Bicknels farm up the Waitawheta Valley. The event was run by the Nambassa group, who were originally based in the Waikino village, prior to their move to Waihi. Proceeds from this event purchased a winter's supply of fuel for the aged residents of the village and towards the construction of a new post office after the 1981 flood.

=== 1981 flood ===
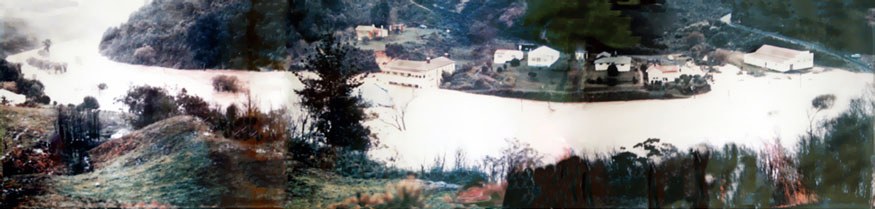
The great 1981 flood of Waikino

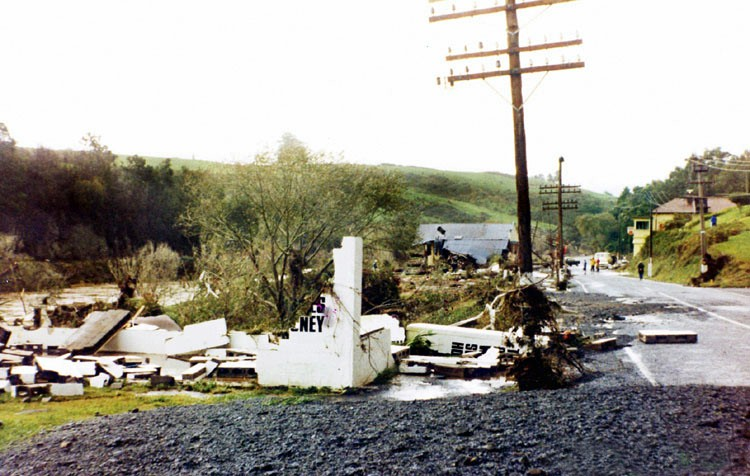
1981 Waikino flood aftermath

The main highway shops came to a devastating end in the great Ohinemuri river floods of 1981. A huge torrent of water washed much of the Waikino business district and many homes them downstream through the Karangahake Gorge. All that was salvageable was the Waikino Hotel and the local community hall, both of which remain operational today.

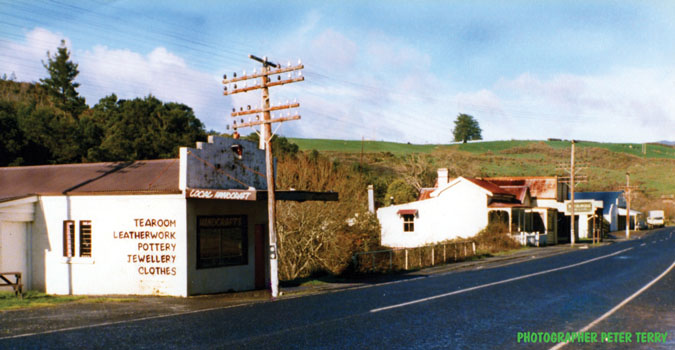
1981 Waikino craft town pre-flood

A new post office was later built on higher ground with funds raised by the community. Initially the National Government deemed a new community post office uneconomical, and so decided not to replace one of the town's focal community services which was depended on by the large aged population to cash their weekly pension cheques. This decision was not welcomed by many locals, many of whom subsequently joined the campaign group "Waikino Action committee", which lobbied Government and the wider community to have a new community post office constructed. After a bitter campaign the Government agreed to build a post office, conditional on the community footing much of the bill; which it did. After the postal services were privatised under Rogernomics in the 1990s this postal service was terminated permanently.

Waikino also has its own primary school which caters for children from as far as Waihi with a daily bus service. The school provides for Year 1 to 6 students, and boasts one computer per two students.

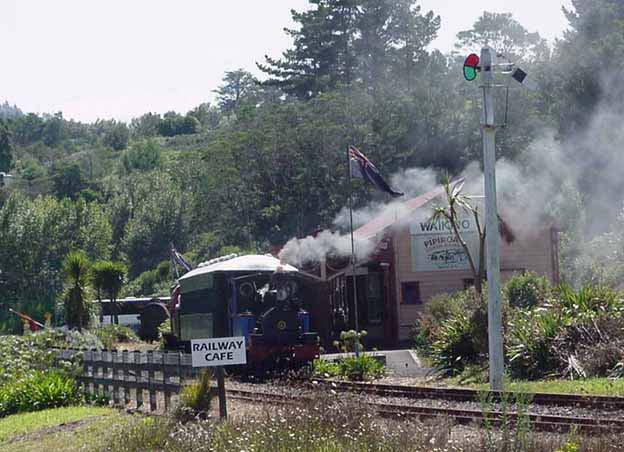
Waikino Steam Train and Railway Cafe in 2005

Tourism and cottage industries are Waikino's primary revenue sources today. Numerous organised tours and walks around the old mining facilities and old rail tunnels, and around beautiful native bush which surround waterfalls and scenic valleys, are available. There is also a community sponsored heritage railway from the Waikino station café to Waihi, the Goldfields Railway. This line used to be part of the East Coast Main Trunk Railway and opened in November 1905, but in 1978, a deviation to the south opened and made it redundant. The Goldfields Railway successfully saved the 6 km of track between Waihi and Waikino and is now a popular tourist attraction, running trains daily with preserved steam locomotives and diesel locomotives providing motive power.

== Demographics ==
Waikino is described by Statistics New Zealand as a rural settlement. It covers 1.75 km^{2} (0.68 sq mi) and had an estimated population of 320 as of June 2025, with a population density of 183 people per km^{2}. It is part of the larger Waihi Rural statistical area.

Historical population
Year	Pop.	±% p.a.
2006	285	—
2013	300	+0.74%
2018	303	+0.20%
2023	318	+0.97%

Waikino had a population of 318 in the 2023 New Zealand census, an increase of 15 people (5.0%) since the 2018 census, and an increase of 18 people (6.0%) since the 2013 census. There were 165 males and 156 females in 144 dwellings. 3.8% of people identified as LGBTIQ+. The median age was 55.8 years (compared with 38.1 years nationally). There were 39 people (12.3%) aged under 15 years, 39 (12.3%) aged 15 to 29, 156 (49.1%) aged 30 to 64, and 87 (27.4%) aged 65 or older.

People could identify as more than one ethnicity. The results were 94.3% European (Pākehā); 16.0% Māori; 4.7% Pasifika; 0.9% Asian; 0.9% Middle Eastern, Latin American and African New Zealanders (MELAA); and 1.9% other, which includes people giving their ethnicity as "New Zealander". English was spoken by 99.1%, Māori language by 1.9%, Samoan by 0.9%, and other languages by 5.7%. No language could be spoken by 0.9% (e.g. too young to talk). New Zealand Sign Language was known by 0.9%. The percentage of people born overseas was 23.6, compared with 28.8% nationally.

Religious affiliations were 21.7% Christian, 0.9% Hindu, 0.9% Islam, 1.9% Buddhist, 0.9% New Age, and 1.9% other religions. People who answered that they had no religion were 65.1%, and 9.4% of people did not answer the census question.

Of those at least 15 years old, 42 (15.1%) people had a bachelor's or higher degree, 153 (54.8%) had a post-high school certificate or diploma, and 81 (29.0%) people exclusively held high school qualifications. The median income was $27,500, compared with $41,500 nationally. 9 people (3.2%) earned over $100,000 compared to 12.1% nationally. The employment status of those at least 15 was that 93 (33.3%) people were employed full-time, 54 (19.4%) were part-time, and 9 (3.2%) were unemployed.

== Education ==
Waikino School is a co-educational state primary school, with a roll of 84 as of July 2026.
