= Friggebod =

Small garden outbuilding

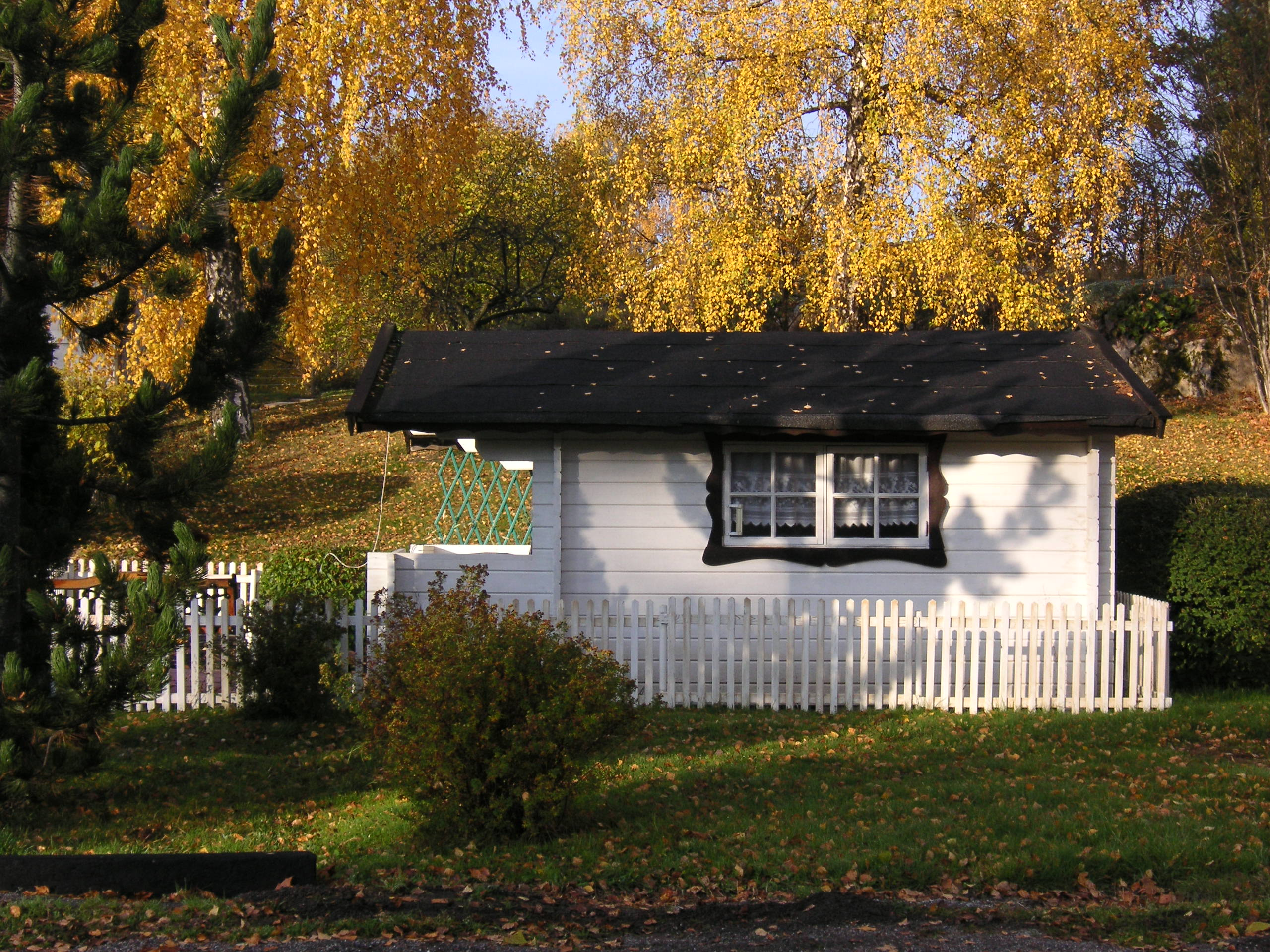
A friggebod

In Sweden, a friggebod is a small shed or cottage which can be built without any planning permission on a lot with a single-family or a duplex house. It is named after Birgit Friggebo, the Minister for Housing in 1979 when the new type of building was approved. The word is a portmanteau of Friggebo and bod 'shed'.

Typical uses for a friggebod are a greenhouse, a workshop, a guest room, or a home spa.

== Restrictions ==
Originally no more than 10 square metres (110 sq ft), the maximum size was raised to 15 square metres (160 sq ft) in 2008. The friggebod regulations also allow the building of a canopy and a wall of wood or brick to protect a patio. The buildings do not have to follow zoning regulations, but they have to comply with the building code and cannot be built closer to a neighbour's lot than 4.5 metres (15 ft) without the neighbour's permission.

== See also ==
- Alternative housing
- Cottage
- Tiny house
- Construction trailer
- Simple living
- Garden buildings
