= Portable building =

Building designed to be movable

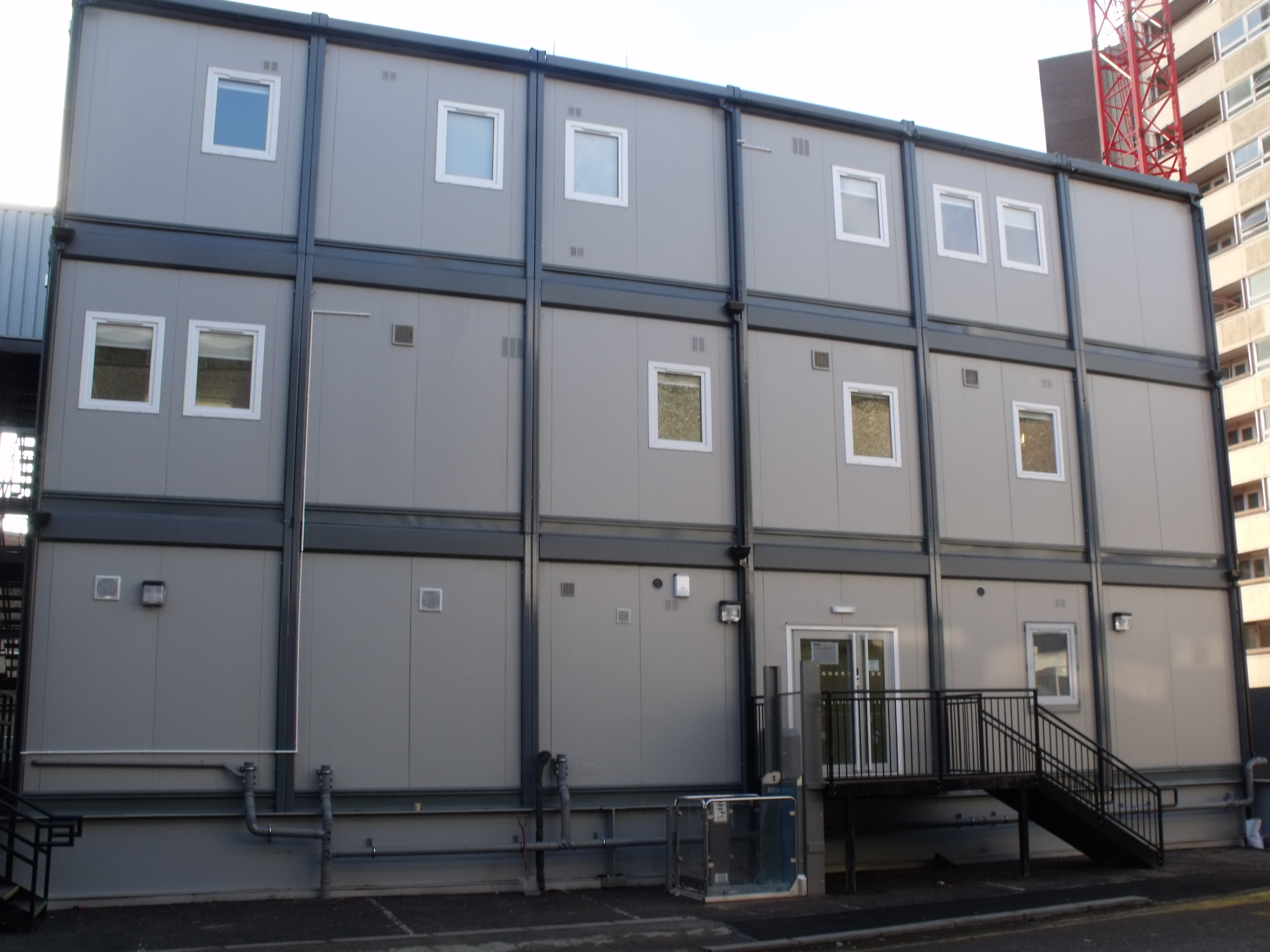
Temporary buildings on site during construction at Birmingham New Street station in 2011

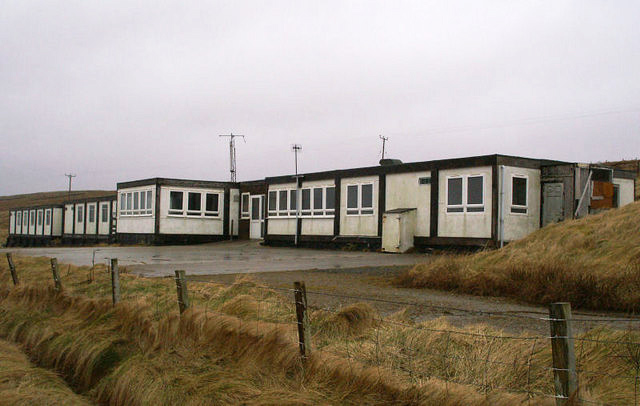
North Isles Motel in Cunnister, Shetland

A portable, demountable or transportable building is a building designed and built to be movable rather than permanently located.

Smaller version of portable buildings are also known as portable cabins. Portable cabins are prefabricated structures manufactured for uses such as site office, security cabin, accommodation, storage, toilets etc. Portable cabins are a cheaper alternative to traditional buildings and are useful when accommodation is required for an uncertain period of time.

A common modern design is sometimes called a modular building but portable buildings can be different in that they are more often used temporarily and taken away later. Portable buildings (e.g. yurts) have been used since prehistoric times.

Many modern types of portable buildings are designed so that they can be carried to or from the site on a large lorry and slung on and off by a crane.

== Modern usage ==
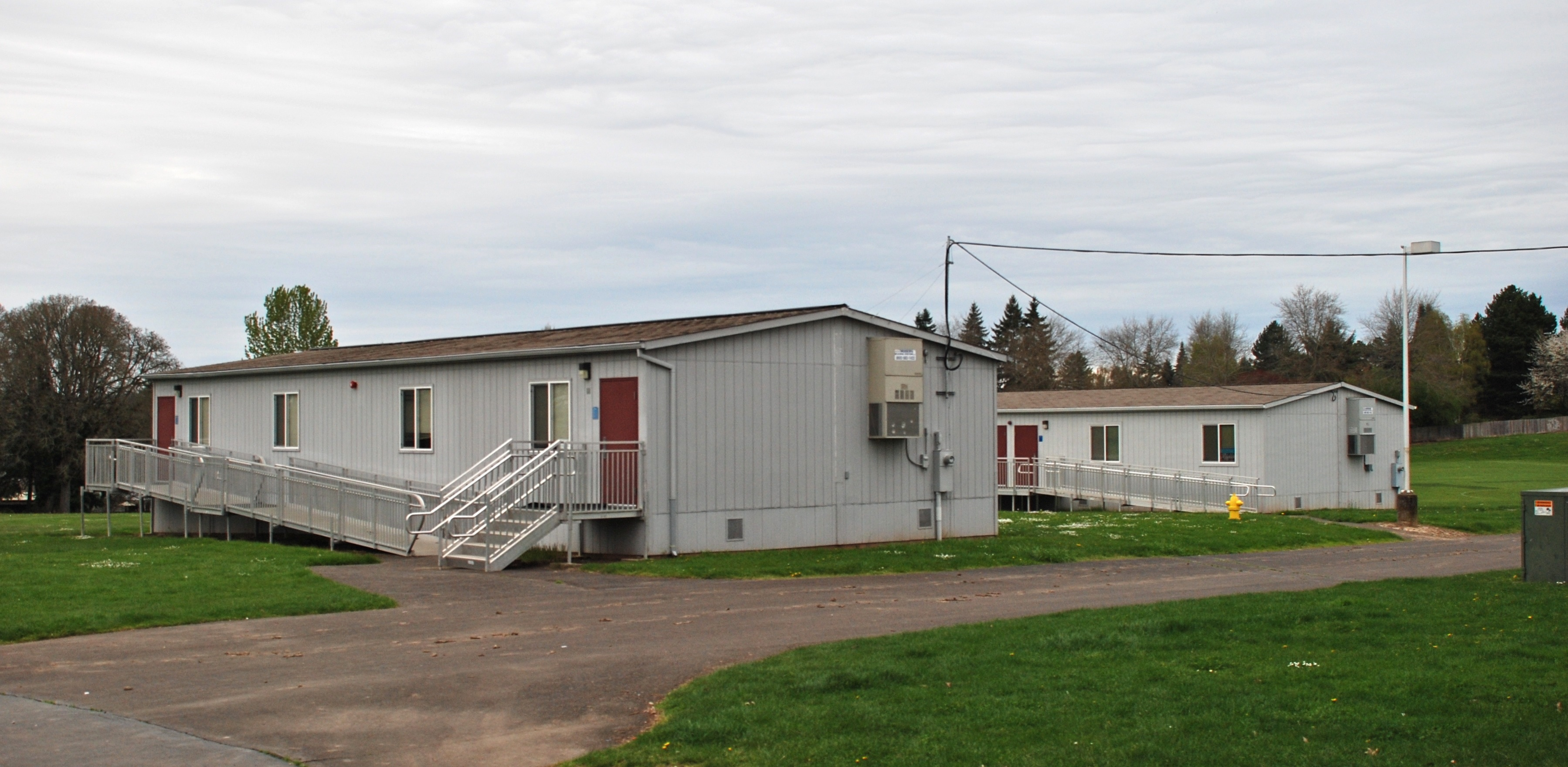
One of the most common types of portable building is the portable classroom building.

The first portable building under the trade name Portakabin was developed in 1961 in York, England, by Donald Shepherd.

Portable modular buildings have various uses. They are often seen, alone or in groups, as temporary site offices on building sites (where they are often stacked two high with metal stairs to reach the upper level; see also Construction trailer). Other uses for these and other types of portable buildings are as guard shacks, in-plant offices (these are typically portable steel buildings), rural offices, on-site changing rooms, etc. Some portable buildings can be made very complex by joining units and forming large office blocks over several floors. These are often disguised as a normal building with brick style cladding and a traditional pitched roof. Tara Park, developed by Liverpool City Council, have even used portable buildings to create temporary/permanent domestic housing for communities. Still complying with UK building regulations and disabled access.

Due to population increases in many areas, portable buildings are sometimes brought in to schools to provide relief from overcrowding. Portable classroom buildings often include two classrooms separated by a partition wall and a toilet. Portable buildings can also serve as a portable car garage or a storage unit for larger items. Businesses will often utilize portable buildings for bulk storage or construction equipment.

== Alternative names ==
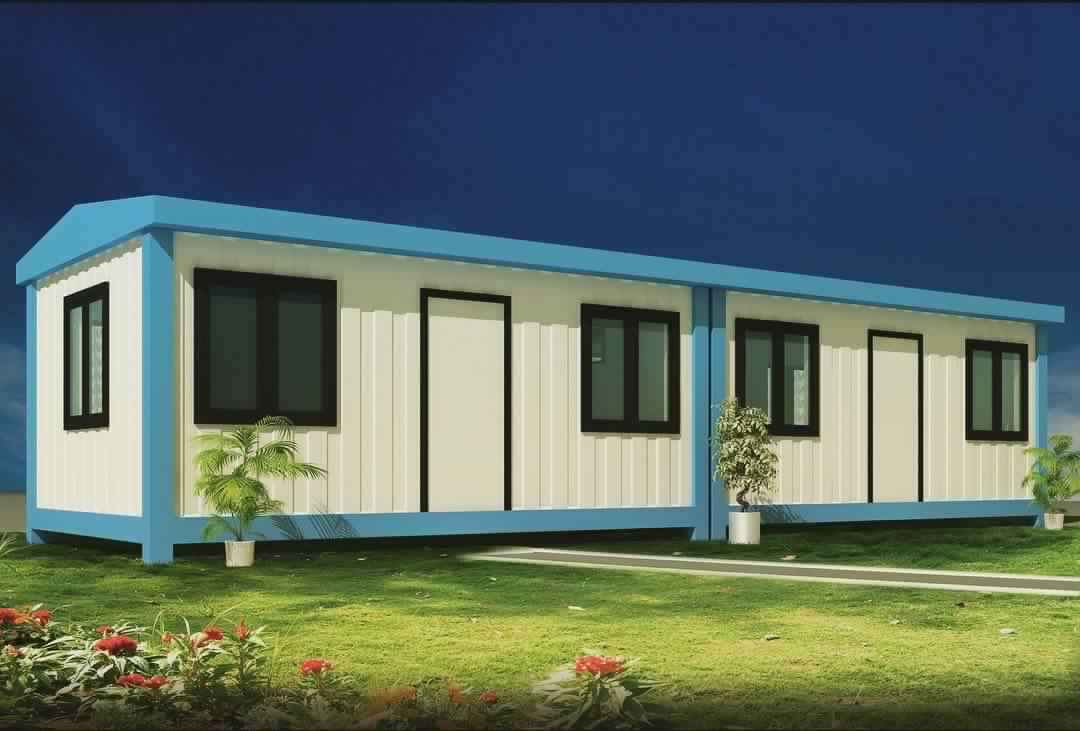
Portable cabins

In Australia, small portable dwellings are often called dongas. In Australia the word "demountable" in particular refers to portable classrooms.

In the United Kingdom the words "Portakabin", "Portacabin", "Bunkabin" and "terrapin" are commonly used to describe these buildings. The use of these words as generic descriptions of portable buildings has caused contention amongst some manufacturers.

The "Portakabin" spelling with a 'k' is a trademark owned by Portakabin Ltd to identify its range of relocatable and modular buildings but is often used as a generic trademark to mean any portable building of that general pattern. The spelling with a 'c' normally refers to similar temporary buildings made by other companies; Portakabin Ltd argues that the spelling "portacabin" is a misspelling.

"Terrapin" like Portakabin, is a portable building manufacturer, although the term "terrapin building" is often used to describe any modular or prefabricated building. The use of “terrapin” dates back further than “Portakabin or “Portacabin” as the company has been trading for over 60 years. The phrase “terrapin classroom” arose from the sudden need for additional classroom space following the post-World War II baby boom era, and is now common usage for any portable classroom.

In Canada, Australia, and elsewhere, portable buildings are sometimes referred to as "ATCO huts," after the Canadian energy company that manufactures a line of them in one of its business units.

== See also ==
- Alternative housing
- Construction trailer
- Modular building
- Portable classroom
- Prefabricated building
- Quonset hut
- Tiny home movement
