= Work camp =

A work camp is accommodation provided on a remote job site or workplace such as a mine site or logging area

It may also refer to:

- Labor camp, (or labour camp) a detention facility where inmates are forced to engage in penal labor as a form of punishment
- Logging camp, (or lumber camp) a transitory work site used in the logging industry
- Mining community, (also a mining town or a mining camp) a community that houses miners
- Total institution, (or residential institution) is a place of work and residence
- Workcamp, where groups of volunteers from different countries work and live together as a team
- Workamping, (a combination of work and camping) where people generally receive compensation in the form of a free campsite, usually with free utilities and additional wages
