= Alternative housing =

Category of domicile structures

Alternative housing is a category of domicile structures that are built or designed outside of the mainstream norm e.g., town homes, single family homes and apartment complexes. In modern days, alternative housing commonly takes the form of tiny houses, dome homes, pyramid-shaped houses, earth sheltered homes, residential tree houses, abandoned factories and hospitals and even up-cycled vans or buses. The motivation to create alternative homes can arise from destitution or lack of resources to buy or rent a typical home and therefore include improvised shacks in shantytowns, buses, cars and tent-like structures.

While the cost of living in an alternative house can be more economical than a traditional home, the start-up cost can be quite hefty. More commonly in the 21st century than ever before in history, alternative housing offers more functionality to many, as well as an unconventional living arrangement. Some alternative housing can be as small as 500 square feet (46 m^{2}) while others can be as large as 5,000 square feet (460 m^{2}) depending on the structure. Alternative housing, much like common housing, usually offers an area for cooking, sleeping, bathing, and an overall living space.

== Rise in popularity ==
One of the first popular uses of alternative housing in modern times was during WWI and the Great Depression. During the Great Depression, many people ended up losing their homes. More than 15 million people were out of work at the time, and desperate for housing. Due to the vast influx of homeless people, the creation of Hoovervilles took place. Alternative housing at the time was used as a way of living to save money, and to do that, people built shanty homes. As time went on, people began to take ideas learned from shantytowns and put them to use in other forms of alternative housing.

In contemporary society, alternative housing is moving from last resort housing to an option that people choose in the face of a housing market that is getting more and more costly. With the rise of social media, more and more people were exposed to the idea of alternative housing, and its popularity grew. Paired with an increase in spendable income, the choice to live differently grew stronger.

Social media can be attributed to playing a major role in the rise in popularity of alternative housing. Sharing pictures, videos, and information about alternative housing spreads knowledge about the concept. During the early days of Instagram, a young couple became a lifestyle brand with millions of followers all because of their living situation; living in a van. The artistry and mindset of van living drew in Instagram followers, and led to a movement of people following suit under the hashtag #vanlife.

Facebook is another example of social media influence. A survey conducted in Australia has found that there is an increasing trend in people wanting to own a tiny home, specifically in older women. The trend is argued to stem from growing Facebook pages, as one has more than 50,000 followers. Facebook groups allow people interested in alternative housing to connect with each other to make the process easier.

== Around the world ==
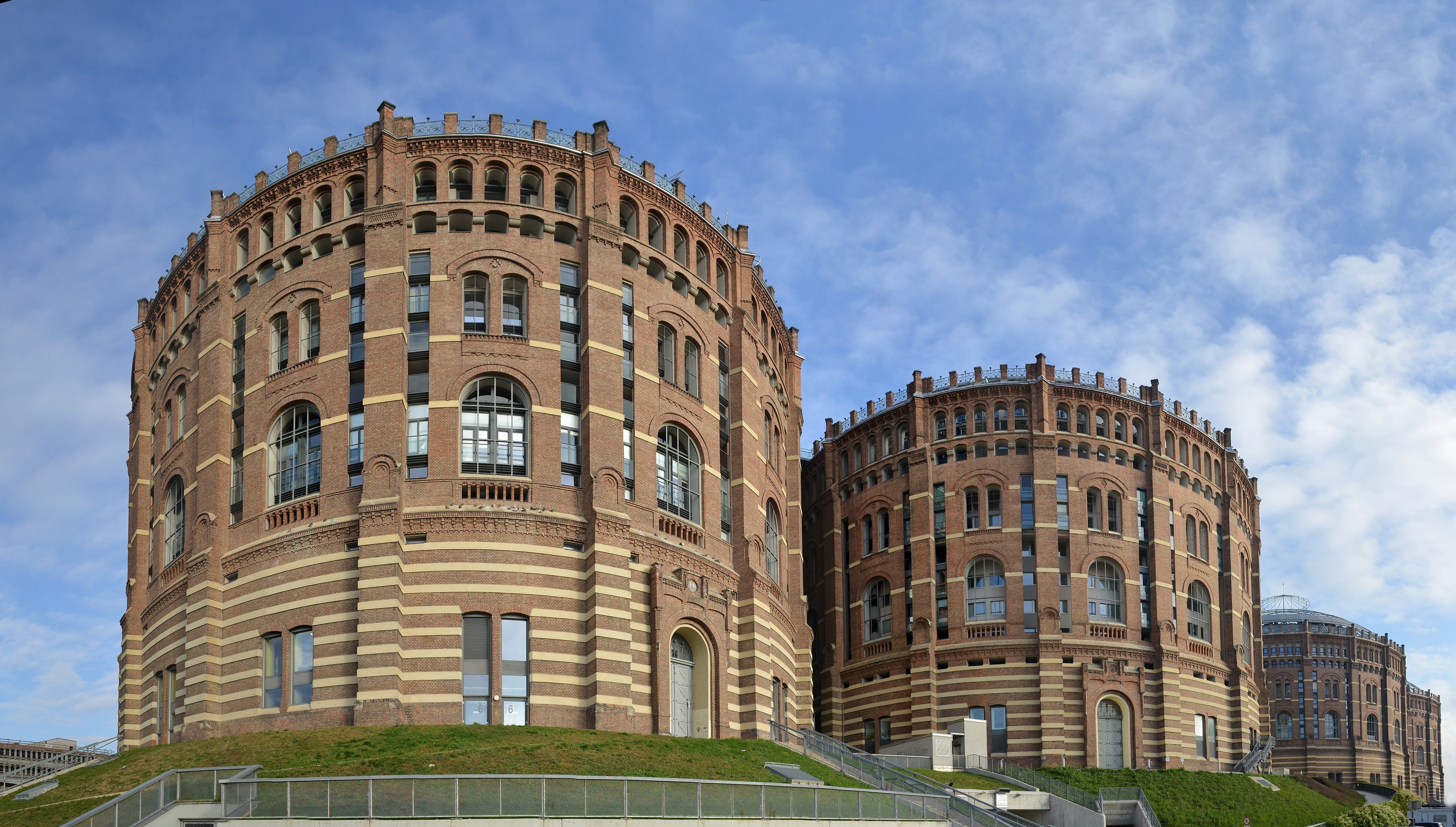
One of the most successful residential reuse projects is Gasometer City, in Vienna Austria. Four immense disused gasometers were successfully revamped in the late '90s and have since become famous in the world of adaptive reuse.

Alternative housing around the world, while on the rise, has not yet reached the heights of popularity as it has in North America. Most of the alternative homes across the world tend to be adaptive/reuse homes. These types of homes/building tend to be derelict or unused buildings (hotels, factories or hospitals) that are converted into low-income housing, green sustainability communities, schools or hotels.

The Australian Government's Department of Environment and Heritage published a report that found that reusing a building's material for a new purpose has a 95% savings of "embodied energy" that would be otherwise wasted. This "embodied energy" is by the Australian government as "the energy consumed by all of the processes associated with the production of a building, from the mining and processing of natural resources to manufacturing, transport, and product delivery."

While the savings (monetary, materials and construction hours) can be had with reusing a building and adapting it to modern standards and local building codes, there is more to adapting a building for modern reuse than just focusing on saving money.

The benefits of reusing old buildings are increased building life, reduced resource consumption, less material waste and financial incentive. Apart from the cost of reusing a building, other factors can also play a vital role in the candidacy of a building for adaptive reuse. They include the following; social value, potential for reuse, historical importance, and environmental conditions.

=== Adaptive reuse in Europe ===
In Europe, adaptive reuse buildings are now on the rise and decisions must be made on preserving historical buildings or demolishing them to make way for modern buildings. With adaptive reuse, most historical buildings can now be salvaged and updated to a more practical, modern use, with many of the modern amenities most homeowners enjoy. This allows for the face of the building to keep its original look, while the interior is updated to local building codes and for comfort. This will help retain the buildings and communities historical look and feel, while meeting new building codes.

=== Micro homes in Japan ===
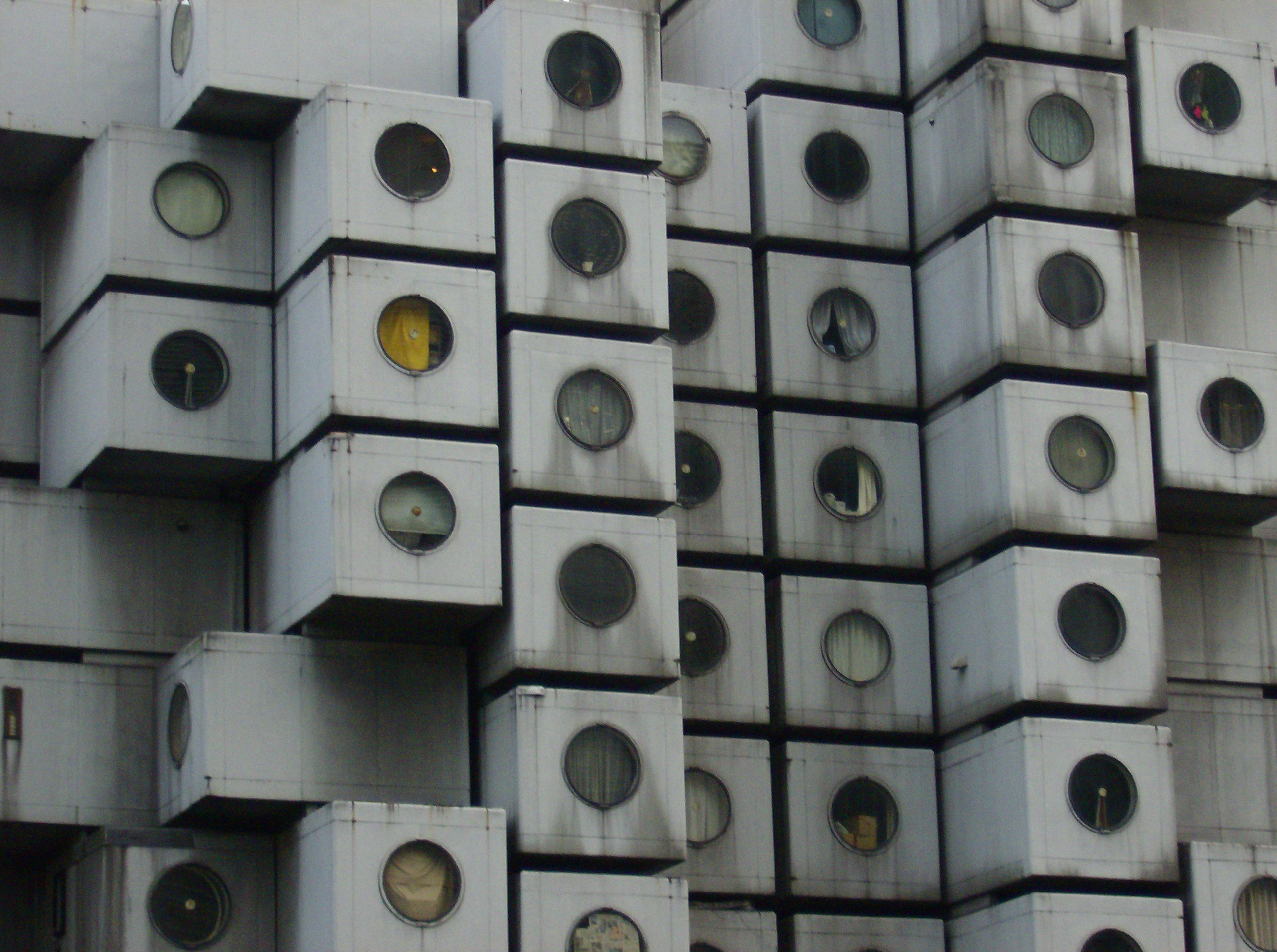
Small homes

Japan's major cities are facing a housing crisis. They have a dense population with skyrocketing property prices. The rise in prices over the last few years has meant that many people are looking for small plots of land to build on. Some of these microhomes are as small as 182 square feet. Many engineers and architects are now looking to smaller homes in order to maximize the limited space. With Tokyo being one of the most dense cities in Japan, many consider these micro homes so they can live next to where they work.

== Low budget ==
While alternative living can be quite expensive, other options for low budget alternative housing include pallet homes, camping as a lifestyle, or even living in a community such as the Habitat for Humanity Twin Creeks Village located in Everett, WA. Many Americans struggle each year to make ends meet, resulting in the growth of these low budget housing options. For instance, Detroit has a program designed for just this: Cass Community Social Services constructs tiny homes for families rebuilding their lives and credit. These alternative communities forge the way for families or single persons to make small monthly payments and utilities so they can own the tiny home and gain back credit.

== Popular living ==
Pallet houses: Pallet houses, made from wooden shipping pallets, are an inexpensive alternative housing option. Pallets are convenient to find, and building them into houses is not difficult. In most cases, pallet houses are built for people recovering from natural disasters. Pallet Houses became extremely popular when refugees were returning to Kosovo after the war.

Shipping Container: Shipping Containers are an alternative style of living for people looking to be eco-friendly. They are very durable for weather, but are expensive.

Tiny House Movement: Tiny houses are the most popular alternative housing. Tiny houses average 100–400 square feet and are usually mobile. Tiny houses are an attractive option for those looking to save money on housing and live according to Minimalism.

Outbuilding: Considered as a garage, shed, or a barn, many people choose them for living, almost like a cabin. They are only about $10,000, and can serve as a nice livable place to call home.

Recreational Vehicle: In many cases, people choose to make an RV their permanent mobile living space. While living out of an RV is not for everyone, it is a cost-effective way to travel the country while never leaving home. More importantly - especially when being used by those suffering from economic hardships - is not travel, since fuel and upkeep costs can be exorbitant, but rather the self contained nature of even the smallest RV beats out the insecurity of a sleeping bag or tent.

Earth House (Earth Berm): Underground earth sheltered homes, are private, can handle extreme weather temperatures, and require less to insure because of the added protection it gives from weather, and against high winds. However Earth Berms can be on the pricey side about 20% more than a regular home, and moisture precautions have to be accounted for during the building process as well. Also applying for a home loan, and the mortgage process becomes more difficult, with more hoops to jump through.

Yurt: A small, Lightweight, but maximizing way to live, with minimal materials. Nomads from central Asia have used yurts to live for centuries. They have natural strength when built, because of their pyramid design, and are aerodynamic, because of curved walls, which makes the wind flow around it instead of push through.

== See also ==
- Affordable housing
- Cottage
- Beach hut
- Earthship
- Friggebod
- Yurt
- Laneway house
- Mobile home
- Vandwelling
- Housetrucker
- New Age travellers
- Recreational vehicles
- Workamping
- Fulltiming
- Shepherd's hut
- Construction trailer
- Perpetual traveler
- Digital nomad
- Global nomad
- Cruising (maritime)
- Seasteading
- Houseboat
- Modular building
- Shipping container architecture
- Summer house
- Tiny home movement
- Simple living
- Minimalism
- FIRE movement
- Homestead principle
- Squatting
- Free State Project
- New Monasticism
- Bruderhof Communities
- Lebensreform
