= Trudy McFall =

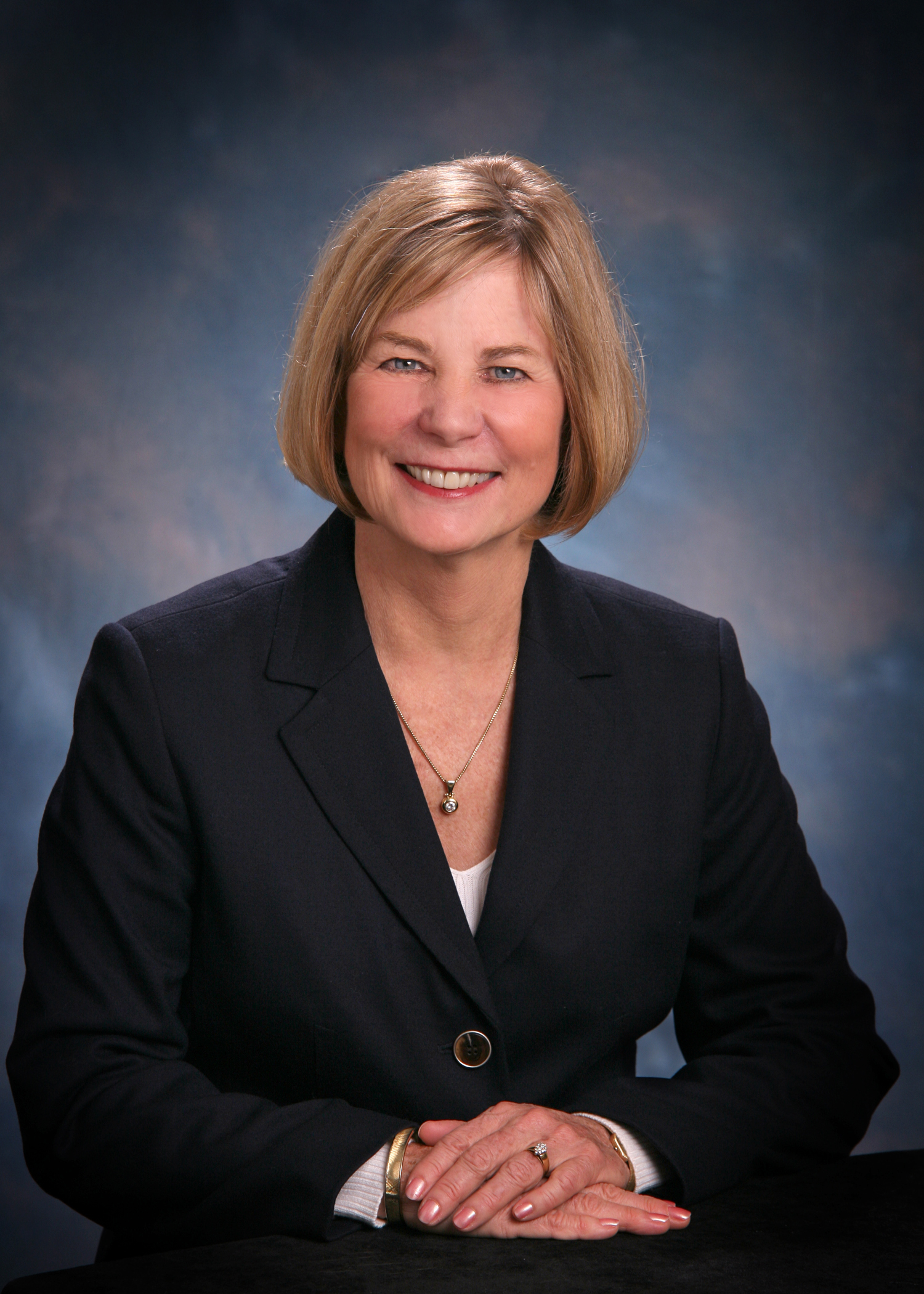

Trudy McFall is co-founder and Chairman of Homes for America (HFA), an Annapolis, Maryland based business founded in September 1994. HFA is the tenth largest non-profit developer of affordable housing in the country.

== Career ==
McFall is primarily known for her involvement in affordable housing, with 35 years of executive management in the public and private sectors. In 2009, she was a candidate for Mayor of Annapolis, but was defeated in the primaries.

Prior to Homes for America, McFall was the Director of Maryland's housing finance agency, the Community Development Administration (CDA), for 13 years until July 1994. During her tenure, CDA was among the most active of the country's housing finance agencies. At CDA, she managed over $500 million in funds annually. In 1993, she was named Outstanding Maryland Administrator.

Prior to working at CDA, McFall spent four years managing HUD's national urban planning, regional housing programs, and state and local assistance programs as Director of HUD's Office of Planning. She also administered a regional housing planning program and directed a regional housing authority for the Metropolitan Council in the Minneapolis-St Paul, Minnesota region.

== Publications ==
McFall is widely published in housing and planning publications and is a frequent speaker at national housing conferences. She has served on the boards and as an officer with many national housing and planning organizations, including the boards of the National Housing Conference, the National Leased Housing Association, the National Housing and Rehabilitation Association, the National Council of State Housing Agencies, the Housing & Development Reporter, and the Tax Credit Advisor. She has served as a consultant to HUD, Fannie Mae, Congress and national housing organizations.

As a civic activist in Annapolis, McFall has been active in a wide variety of local volunteer efforts. In 2007, she founded Citizens for a Better Annapolis (CBA), an organization that brought facts to public policy debates. Through CBA, she has issued reports on crime, education, and housing. She is presently head of the West Annapolis Development Committee and has presented testimony opposing increased density potential that is being suggested by the current, proposed Comprehensive Plan. She was named Volunteer of the Year in 2005 by the Community Foundation of Anne Arundel County.

== Education ==
McFall holds a BA from Indiana University and a MA from Bryn Mawr College.

== Awards and honours ==
In 2018 McFall received the Helping Hand award from the Annapolis, Maryland "Seeds 4 Success" organization.
