= Harald Langemyhr =

Norwegian businessman (born 1965)

Harald Karsten Maurice Langemyhr (born 1 February 1965) is a Norwegian businessman who been indicted by Norwegian prosecuting authority and is scheduled for a 14-week trial in Oslo Tingrett starting September 5, 2011.

== Reports in media ==
Aftenposten wrote in September 2011 that "It was TV-Norge that filmed how workers lived "three and three" in 10 square meter construction trailers outside a public construction site. — The construction trailers were only approved for pauses [and not approved as living quarters]. But the employees were deducted 2500 Norwegian kroner every month for living there." ... uncovered also that an additional 70-80 Polish construction workers were lodged in a house at Vallø outside Tønsberg. The attic, the cellar and hallways were used as "sleeping space". — Norwegian Labour Inspection Authority characterized the conditions, as some of the worst they had seen."

== Civil lawsuit ==
In 2013 in a civil lawsuit he was awarded 20 million kroner. The verdict said that no party "has won the case in full, or in the broadest sense". It added that "the conditions altogether were of such a nature and scope that they fulfill the criteria for social dumping.

Langemhyr has made repeated attempts to sue the state personally and through his company Byggmester Harald Langemhyr AS. In the first case from 2013 a demand of more than 294 million kroner was put forward by Langemyhr, the latest attempt coming in March 2020 where Langemyhr sued the state for 70 million kroner. Langemyhr brought the case to appeal where the original verdict from 2013 was considered to be upheld in essence.
