= Affordable housing =

Housing affordable to those with a median household income

Affordable housing is housing which is deemed affordable to those with a household income at or below the median, as rated by the national government or a local government by a recognized housing affordability index. Most of the literature on affordable housing refers to mortgages and a number of forms that exist along a continuum – from emergency homeless shelters, to transitional housing, to non-market rental (also known as social or subsidized housing), to formal and informal rental, indigenous housing, and ending with affordable home ownership. Demand for affordable housing is generally associated with a decrease in housing affordability, such as rent increases, in addition to increased homelessness.

Housing choice is a response to a complex set of economic, social, and psychological impulses. For example, some households may choose to spend more on housing because they feel they can afford to, while others may not have a choice.

Increases in any housing supply (whether affordable housing or market-rate housing) leads to increased housing affordability across all segments of the housing markets.

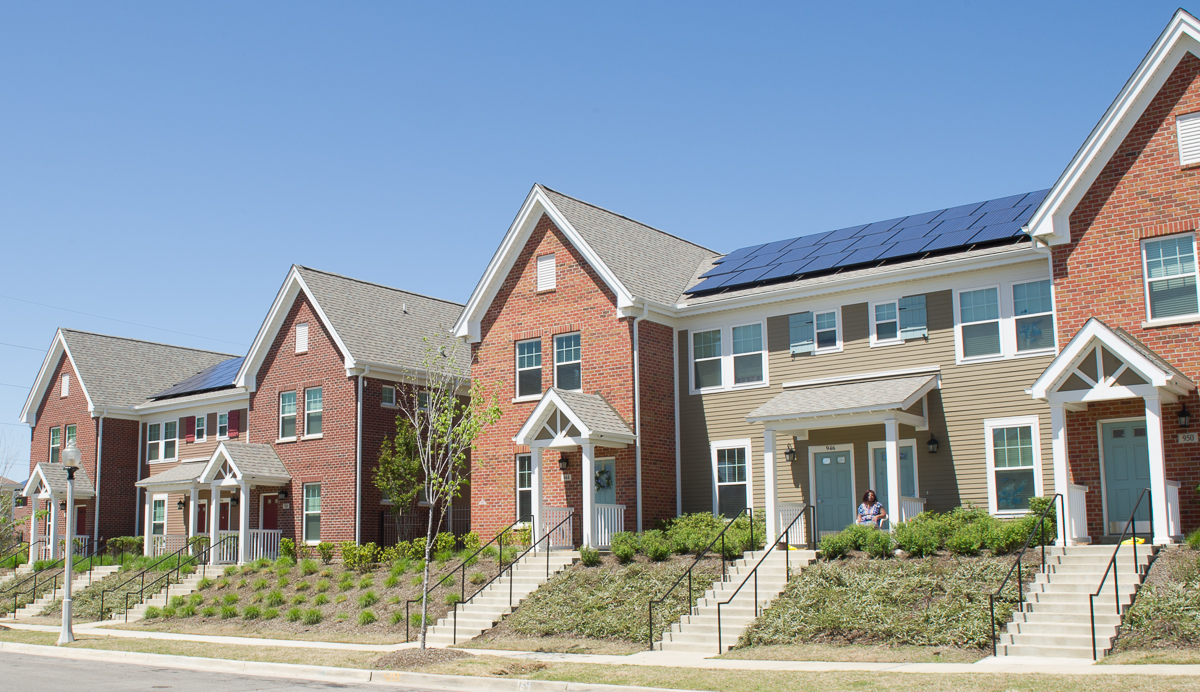
Legends Park West Mixed-Income and Affordable Housing Redevelopment in Memphis, Tennessee

== Definition and measurement ==
There are several means of defining and measuring affordable housing. The definition and measurement may change in different nations, cities, or for specific policy goals.

=== Definitions ===
The definition of affordable housing may change depending on the country and context. For example, in Australia, the National Affordable Housing Summit Group developed their definition of affordable housing as housing that is "...reasonably adequate in standard and location for lower or middle income households and does not cost so much that a household is unlikely to be able to meet other basic needs on a sustainable basis." Affordable housing in the United Kingdom includes "social rented and intermediate housing, provided to specified eligible households whose needs are not met by the market."

In some US contexts, affordable housing may only mean subsidized or public housing whereas in other cases it may include naturally occurring affordable housing or "affordable" by different incomes levels from no income households to moderate income but cost-burdened households.

=== Median house price to income ratio ===
The median multiple indicator, recommended by the World Bank and the United Nations, rates affordability of housing by dividing the median house price by gross (before tax) annual median household income).

A common measure of community-wide affordability is the number of homes that a household with a certain percentage of median income can afford. For example, in a perfectly balanced housing market, the median household (the wealthier half of households) could officially afford the median housing option, while those poorer than the median income could not afford the median home. 50% affordability for the median home indicates a balanced market.

Some countries look at those living in relative poverty, which is usually defined as making less than 60% of the median household income. In their policy reports, they consider the presence or absence of housing for people making 60% of the median income.

=== Housing costs as percentage of gross income ===
Determining housing affordability is complex and the commonly used housing-expenditure-to-income-ratio tool has been challenged. In the United States and Canada, a commonly accepted guideline for housing affordability is a housing cost, including utilities, that does not exceed 30% of a household's gross income. Some definitions include maintenance costs as part of housing costs. Canada, for example, switched to a 25% rule from a 20% rule in the 1950s. In the 1980s this was replaced by a 30% rule. India uses a 40% rule. Some ways to achieve these ratios are to live with roommates and split rent or to have a cheap lease-by-room agreement.

Percent of renters in different affordability categories, US, 2022
less than 30 percent of monthly gross – Affordable	50%
more than 30 percent, but less than 50 percent – Burdened	23%
more than 50 percent of monthly gross – Severely burdened	27%
About half of renters in the US had an affordable rental arrangement, and about half did not.

Using this model, for example, researchers determine that in 2022, about half of renters in the United States paid less than 30% of their monthly income on rent and utilities, and about a quarter paid between 30% and 50%, and about a quarter paid more than 50%.

The OECD Affordable Housing Database estimates the percentage of housing related expenses including rent, imputed rent, energy, water and maintenance costs as percentage of household final consumption expenditure for 2024 by country:

Country	Housing-related % of household expenditure	Year
Australia	23.7	2023
Austria	24.1	2022
Belgium	25.7	2021
Bulgaria	18.4	2022
Canada	25.9	2022
Colombia	13.6	2023
Costa Rica	15.6	2021
Croatia	14.8	2024
Cyprus	16.8	2022
Czechia	26.0	2022
Denmark	29.1	2022
Estonia	22.5	2024
Finland	29.5	2024
France	26.2	2022
Germany	24.6	2021
Greece	21.6	2023
Hungary	22.6	2022
Chile	15.5	2023
Iceland	23.9	2024
Ireland	26.3	2022
Israel	26.2	2023
Italy	22.8	2022
Japan	23.8	2023
South Korea	17.3	2022
Latvia	21.3	2021
Lithuania	16.4	2023
Luxembourg	20.6	2022
Malta	13.9	2022
Mexico	16.1	2023
Netherlands	23.4	2022
New Zealand	25.9	2023
Norway	23.1	2023
Poland	20.8	2023
Portugal	17.3	2022
Romania	18.4	2022
Slovakia	28.0	2024
Slovenia	18.9	2022
Spain	22.3	2022
Sweden	25.3	2022
Switzerland	26.9	2022
Turkey	11.1	2023
United Kingdom	26.4	2024
United States	18.5	2024

=== Housing affordability index approaches ===
There are several types of housing affordability indexes that take a number of factors, not just income, into account when measuring housing affordability.

The American National Association of Realtors and other groups measure market housing through a housing affordability index which measures whether or not a typical family could qualify for a mortgage loan on a typical home. This index calculates affordability based on the national median-priced single family home, the typical family median income, and the prevailing mortgage interest rate to determine if the median income family can qualify for a mortgage on a typical home. To interpret the indices, a value of 100 means that a family with the median income has exactly enough income to qualify for a mortgage on a median-priced home. An index over 100 signifies that family earning the median income has more than enough income for a mortgage loan on the median-priced home (assuming they have a 20 percent down payment). For example, a composite HAI of 120.0 means a family earning the median family income has 120% of the income necessary to qualify for a conventional loan covering 80 percent of a median-priced existing single-family home. An increase in the HAI shows that this family is more able to afford the median-priced home.

The Massachusetts Institute of Technology (MIT) developed a housing affordability index that attempts to capture the total cost of housing by several factors include employment accessibility, amenities, transportation costs and transit access, quality of schools, etc. In computing the index the obvious cost of rents and mortgage payments are modified by the hidden costs of those choices. Other groups have also created amenity based housing affordability indexes.

The Center for Neighborhood Technology developed the Housing + Transportation (H+T) Affordability Index provides a comprehensive view of affordability that includes both the cost of housing and the cost of transportation at the neighborhood level. CNT notes that the 30% of household income affordability measurementment results in little over half (55%) of U.S. neighborhoods being considered "affordable" for the typical household. They note that such a measurement fails to take into account transportation costs (such as multiple cars, gas, maintenance), which are usually a household's second-largest expenditure. When transportation costs are factored into the measurement, the number of affordable neighborhoods nationally drops to 26%, resulting in a net loss of 59,768 neighborhoods that Americans can truly afford. Per CNT's measurement, people who live in location-efficient neighborhoods that are compact, mixed-use, and have convenient access to jobs, services, transit and amenities tend to have lower transportation costs.

=== Household income and wealth approaches ===
Some analysts believe income is the primary factor – not price and availability, that determines housing affordability. In a market economy the distribution of income is the key determinant of the quantity and quality of housing obtained. Therefore, understanding affordable housing challenges requires understanding trends and disparities in income and wealth. Housing is often the single biggest expenditure of low and middle income families. For low and middle income families, their house is also the greatest source of wealth.

Another method of studying affordability looks at the regular hourly wage of full-time workers who are paid only the minimum wage (as set by their local, regional, or national government). This methods attempts to determine if workers at that income can afford adequate housing.

=== Differing parameters and limitations in approaches ===
Measuring affordable housing is tricky. Different organizations look at different things: some at buying homes, others at renting apartments. Many U.S. studies, for example, only consider the average rent of a two-bedroom apartment, regardless of location or quality. This can make housing look more expensive than it actually is for many people. Additionally, these studies often ignore cheaper options like rooms in houses or illegal conversions, even if they are common. Finally, someone paying off a mortgage might look like they are struggling one month, but be fine the next, further skewing the data. An 2026 opinion poll found 64% of Americans were very concerned about price of housing.

== Economics ==
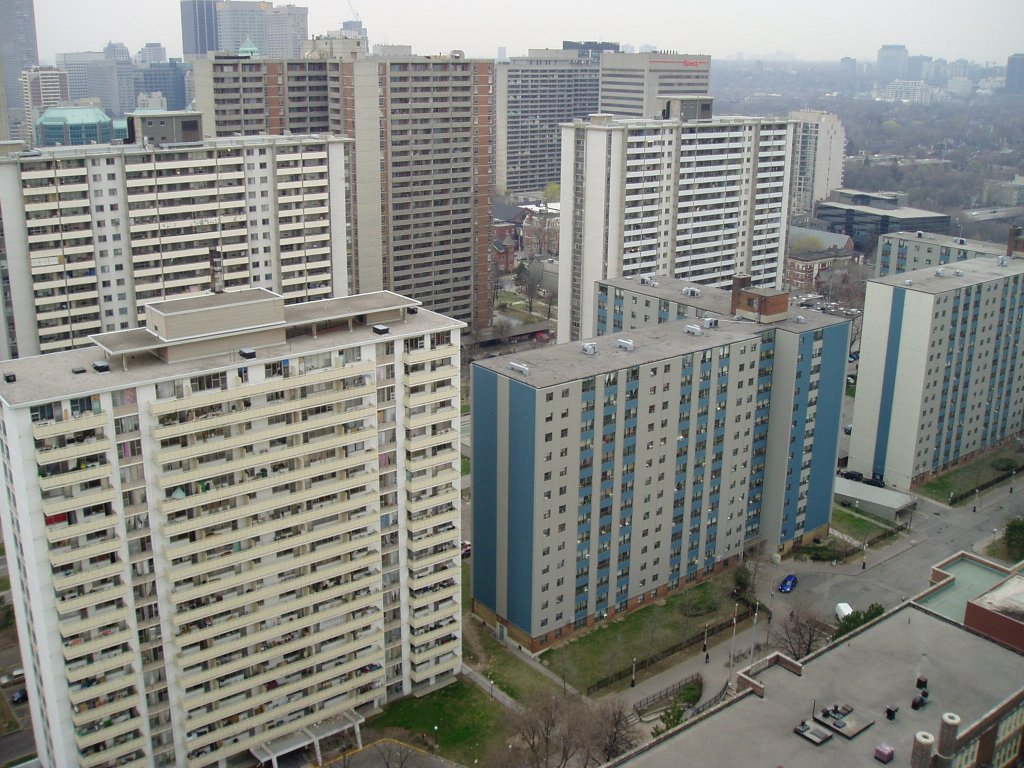
Affordable housing, or low income housing, at the St. James Town neighborhood in Toronto, Ontario, Canada

=== Factors that affect demand of housing stock ===
- demographic changes, increased life expectancy, declining number of people per dwelling, smaller family size, a greater propensity for people to live alone
- young adults delaying forming their own household, changes in desire for home ownership
- relocation for example urban flight, rural flight, growing density convergence and regional urbanization
- population growth
- net migration rate and immigrant population
- reduced profitability of other forms of investment as alternatives to real estate investing

=== Factors that affect supply of housing stock ===
- real estate development rate of housing
- higher gains from unimproved value of land
- availability of housing finance
- significant taxes, levies and fees by government on new housing
- low interest rates
- mortgage market innovations
- changes in planning permissions
- land use rezoning
- changes in building codes
- impact fees

=== Balance between supply and demand ===
Supply and demand curves with price and quantity sold

In research, there is an established connection between the supply of housing and the price of housing; housing tends to be more expensive when there is a shortage of housing (when the supply does not meet demand). In some countries, the market has been unable to meet the growing demand to supply housing stock at affordable prices. Although demand for affordable housing, particularly rental housing that is affordable for low and middle income earners, has increased, the supply has not. YIMBYs argue building more housing makes housing more affordable. Potential home buyers are forced to turn to the rental market, which is also under pressure. An inadequate supply of affordable housing stock increases demand on the private and social rented sector, and in worse case scenarios, results in increased homelessness rates. Homelessness rates are correlated with higher rents, especially in areas where rent exceeds 30% of an area's median income.

=== Factors that affect tenure choices (ex. owner occupier, private rented, social rented) ===
- Employment rates
  - Rising unemployment rates increase demand for market rentals, social housing and homelessness.
- Real household incomes
  - Household incomes have not kept up with rising housing prices
- Affordability of rents and owner occupation
- Interest rates for mortgages
  - Availability of mortgages
- Levels of confidence in the economy and housing market
  - Low confidence decreases demand for owner occupation.

=== Inequality and housing ===
A number of researchers argue that a shortage of affordable housing – at least in the US – is caused in part by income inequality. David Rodda noted that from 1984 and 1991, the number of quality rental units decreased as the demand for higher quality housing increased. Through gentrification of older neighbourhoods, for example, in East New York, rental prices increased rapidly as landlords found new residents willing to pay higher market rate for housing and left lower income families without rental units. The ad valorem property tax policy combined with rising prices made it difficult or impossible for low income residents to keep pace.

Lack of affordable housing places a particular burden on local economies. As well, individual consumers are faced with mortgage arrears and excessive debt and therefore cut back on consumption. A combination of high housing costs and high debt levels contributes to a reduction in savings. These factors can lead to decreased investment in sectors that are essential to the long-term growth of the economy.

The geographic distribution of affordable housing and its respective restrictions provides a disproportionate distribution of benefits to certain economic groups. Research has found that cities are more likely to have zoning restrictions, which effectively limits the expansion of affordable housing units in these areas. These zoning restrictions increase in housing prices, forcing the housing developers who create subsidized housing to look towards other options. Zoning restrictions drive low-income families to live in neighborhoods with reduced opportunities, restricting access to metropolitan economies. These patterns of zoning ultimately force the income divide between different socioeconomic groups to widen by creating enclaves of low-income and wealthy neighborhoods. These enclaves dictate the distribution of labor, causing a geographical distribution of industries that disproportionately exclude low-income residents from lucrative industries.

== Affordable housing and urbanization ==
=== Urbanization ===
The majority of people on earth now live in urban areas. There are more than 500 city regions of more than one million inhabitants in the world. Cities become megacities become megalopolitan city regions and even "galaxies" of more than 60 million inhabitants. The Yangtze Delta-Greater Shanghai region now surpasses 80 million. Tokyo-Yokohama adjacent to Osaka-Kobe-Kyoto have a combined population of 100 million. Rapid population growth leads to increased need for affordable housing in many cities. The benefits of urbanization include employment opportunities and better living conditions with access to infrastructure, education, healthcare, and recreation. World Bank reports that by 2050 nearly 7 of 10 people in the world will live in cities. This kind of growth however brings challenges to urban development as cities are tasked with efficiently using resources in accordance with the global demand for affordable housing. The availability of affordable housing in proximity of mass transit and linked to job distribution has become severely imbalanced in this period of rapid regional urbanization and growing density convergence.

=== The urban poor and homeless ===
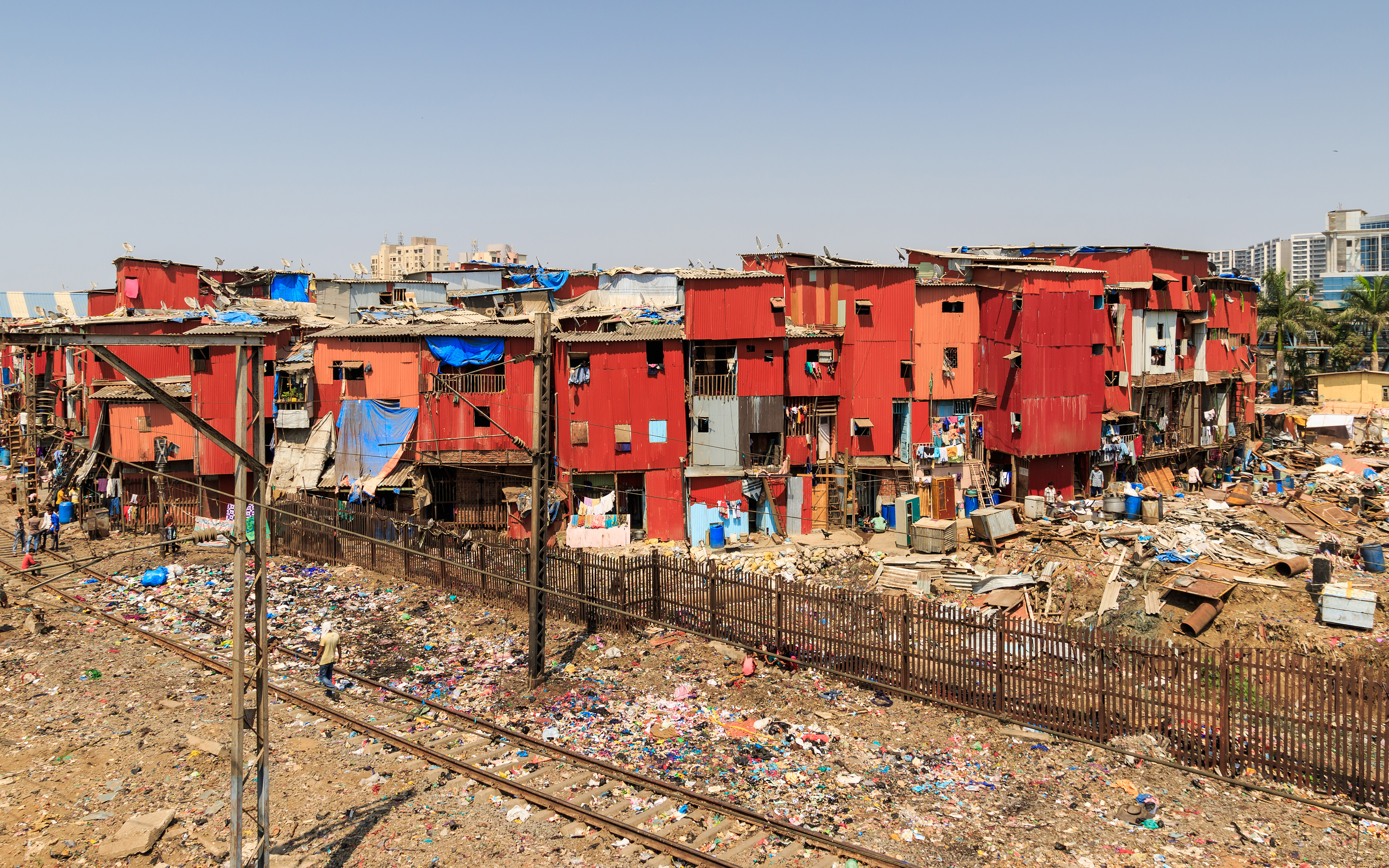
Slums in Mumbai

Globally, it is estimated that 1.6 billion people live in inadequate housing conditions. The majority of that population live in "urban slums" which are highly populated, impoverished residential areas consisting of densely packed housing that lack proper shelter and basic necessities such as clean water, food, hygiene facilities, and electricity. Slums typically form in developing countries as populations migrate from rural to urban areas searching for employment and better living conditions. But due to the higher prices of urban living and a range of other factors such as economic stagnation, migrators find themselves forced to relocate to such slums. The largest slum in the world is Neza-Chalco-Itza in Mexico, housing almost four million people. According to estimates, by 2030 1 in 4 people on the planet will live in a slum or other informal settlement.

Meanwhile, there are approximately 140 million people worldwide who are homeless, usually as a result of being evicted from slums. Since slum residents do not own a title or lease to property, they are often evicted from their home by someone with a claim to the land and left without one. The same principle is applied in the United States as people who are unable to afford their mortgage or rent are evicted and left homeless.

==== The State of Homelessness in America ====
In September 2019, the Council of Economic Advisers from the Executive Office of the President of the United States published the report "The State of Homelessness in America". The report found that "[O]ver half a million people go homeless on a single night in the United States" with approximately 65% or 350,000 people living in homeless shelters and 35% – just under 200,000 people – are unsheltered in the streets (living on sidewalks or in parks, cars, or abandoned buildings). Almost half (47%) of all unsheltered homeless people are found in the state of California. Rates of sheltered homelessness are highest in Boston, New York City, Washington D.C., with NYC alone containing over one-fifth of all sheltered people in the U.S. In a framework of supply and demand the report analyzes the major factors that causes the variation in homelessness across communities. Considering the four major drivers of homeless populations: (i) the higher price of housing resulting from overregulation of housing markets; (ii) the tolerability of sleeping on the street (outside of shelter or housing); (iii) the supply of homeless shelters; and (iv) the characteristics of individuals in a community that make homelessness more likely, the report concludes with federal policies and programs aimed at reducing homelessness.

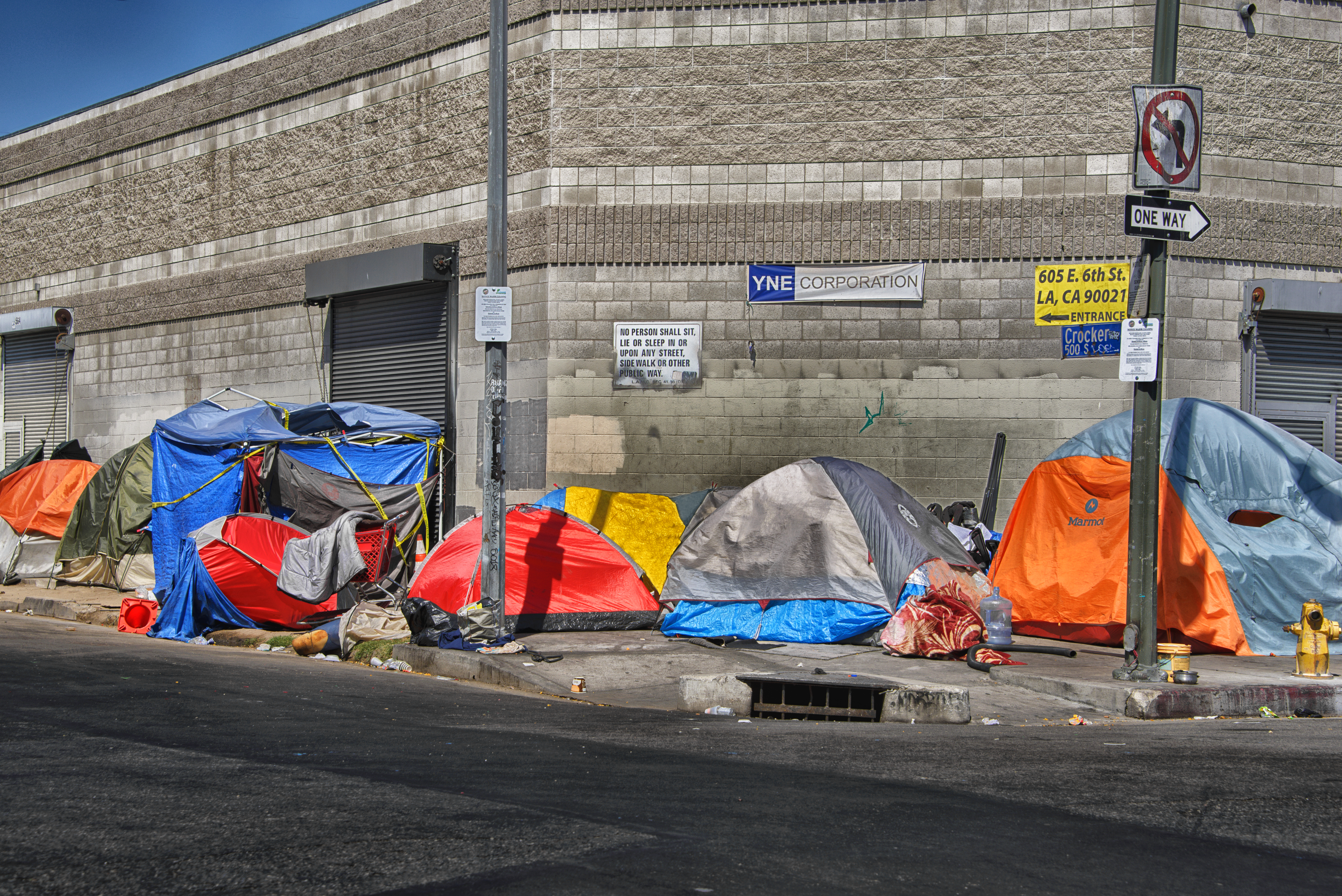
Homeless tents in Los Angeles

The first factor contributing to an increase in homelessness is the higher price of housing resulting from the overregulation of housing markets. As stated in President Trump's Executive Order Establishing a White House Council on Eliminating Regulatory Barriers to Affordable Housing, such regulations include: "overly restrictive zoning and growth management controls; rent controls; cumbersome building and rehabilitation codes; excessive energy and water efficiency mandates; unreasonable maximum-density allowances; historic preservation requirements; overly burdensome wetland or environmental regulations; outdated manufactured-housing regulations and restrictions; undue parking requirements; cumbersome and time-consuming permitting and review procedures; tax policies that discourage investment or reinvestment; overly complex labor requirements; and inordinate impact or developer fees." These regulations reduce the supply of housing and as a result increase the price of a home. Given the relationship between higher home prices and homelessness, the report simulated the impact of deregulation on housing in individual metropolitan areas. It showed that if 11 metropolitan areas with significantly supply constrained housing were deregulated, homelessness would fall by 54 percent in San Francisco, by 50 percent in Honolulu, by 40 percent in Oxnard and Los Angeles, by 38 percent in San Diego, by 36 percent in Washington, D.C., and by between 19 and 26 percent in Boston, Denver, New York, Seattle and Baltimore.

The second factor the report provides is the tolerability of sleeping on the street (outside of shelter or housing). Studies show that cities with warmer climates have significantly higher rates of unsheltered homelessness compared to cities with cold climates. The homeless are more accepting of unsheltered living in areas with warmer conditions, hence why Los Angeles and San Diego have some of the highest unsheltered rates.

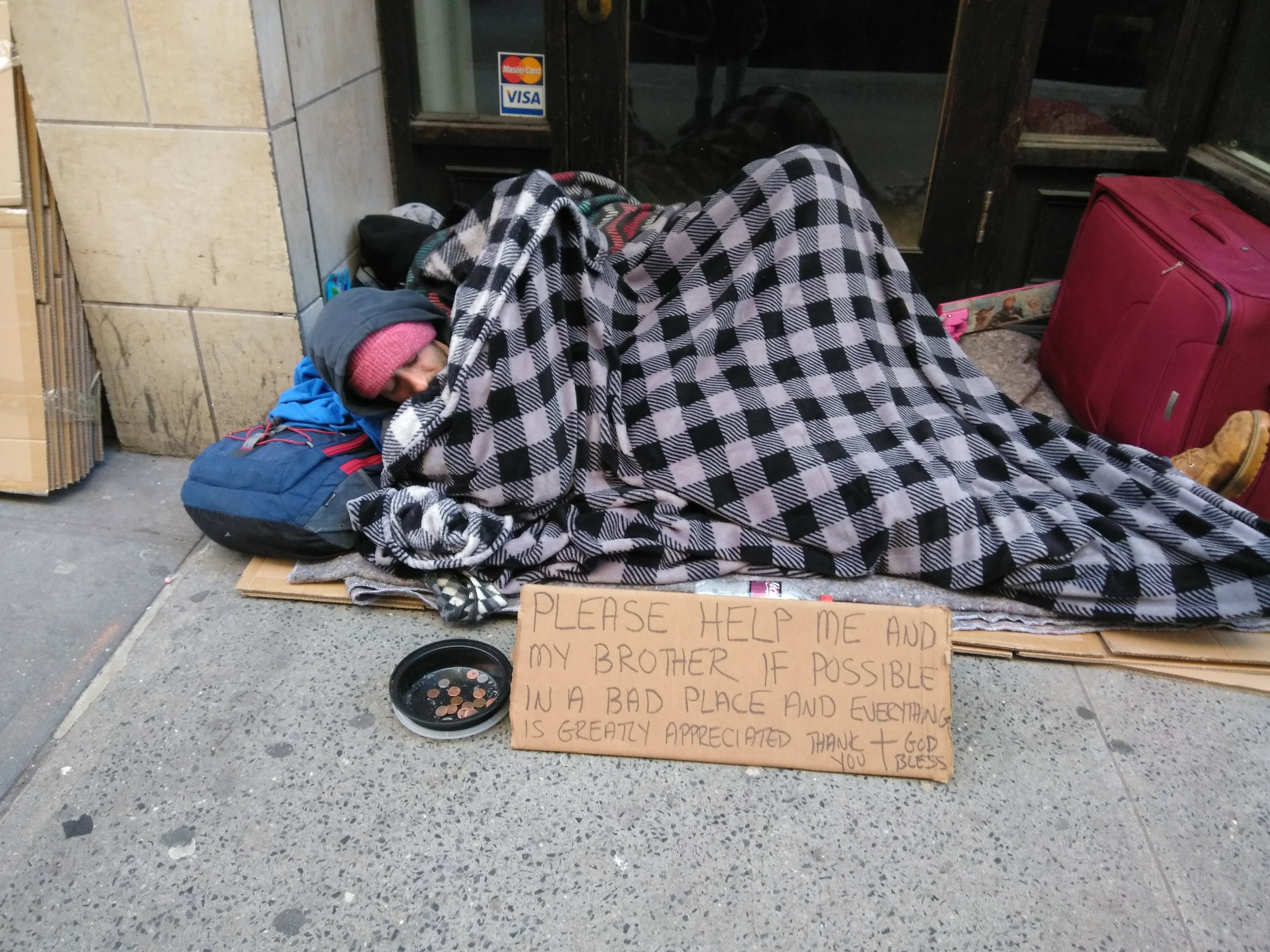
Homeless in New York City

The third factor that explains variation in homelessness is the supply of substitutes to housing through homeless shelters. "Some places, including New York City, the State of Massachusetts, and the District of Columbia – provide a legal "right to shelter" that promises shelter of some minimum level of quality". This means that regardless of occupancy, the shelter ensures a certain level of quality. "Thus, as long as the minimum shelter quality is set high enough (i.e., higher than equilibrium quality levels reached in other places), we would expect right-to-shelter places to have a larger supply of homeless shelters." Since a larger shelter supply entails a higher shelter quality, people who otherwise would not be homeless are found living in shelters because they provide a better alternative. This results in a decrease in the demand for housing and an increase in homelessness.

The fourth and final cause of homelessness is a higher prevalence of individual-level risk factors. These factors include mental health, substance abuse, incarceration, poverty, and social ties. "According to the 2018 homeless point-in-time count, 111,122 homeless people (20 percent) had a severe mental illness and 86,647 homeless people (16 percent) suffered from chronic substance abuse. Among all adults who used shelter at some point in 2017, 44 percent had a disability." In addition, "people experiencing homelessness generally have low incomes and relatively weaker social ties." While the vast majority of people with these issues are not homeless, there is a strong connection to those who are.

The Federal Government provides funding to communities to support homeless assistance programs. The Department of Housing and Urban Development (HUD) is the largest source of Federal funds, providing $2.6 billion combined via the Continuum of Care (CoC) program and Emergency Solution Grant program alone in 2019. These two programs support competitive funding to communities for homeless outreach, emergency shelter, transitional housing, rapid rehousing, permanent supportive housing and homelessness prevention. The U.S. Department of Veterans Affairs (VA) provides $1.8 billion for programs that serve homeless veterans, in addition to funding from HUD targeted specifically to homeless veterans. Other smaller sources of funding include the U.S. Department of Health and Human Services, the U.S. Department of Education, and the U.S. Department of Labor. State and local governments and private philanthropy provide substantial funding and support for homeless assistance as well.

The Trump Administration implemented a range of policies in conjunction with homeless assistance programs in addressing the four major drivers of homelessness. Most significant was the reformation of the Housing First approach which provides competitive funding to CoC's. While the program maintains a commitment to providing housing with no preconditions to program participants, the 2019 Notice of Funding Availability allowed communities flexibility to impose service participation requirements for participants after they have been stabilized in housing. Such reforms allow homeless assistance programs help vulnerable homeless individuals become self-sufficient through employment and earning an income.

== Social and environmental impacts ==
Housing affordability is more than just a personal trouble experienced by individual households who cannot easily find a place to live. Lack of affordable housing is considered by many urban planners to have negative effects on a community's overall health. Unaffordable housing can increase the support for redistribution. Homeowners tend to oppose policies which decrease housing prices.

=== Labour market performance and transportation ===
Lack of affordable housing can make low-cost labor more scarce, and increase demands on transportation systems (as workers travel longer distances between jobs and affordable housing). "Faced with few affordable options, many people attempt to find less expensive housing by buying or renting farther out from their place of employment, but long commutes often result in higher transportation costs that erase any savings on shelter." This has been called the "drive 'til you qualify" approach, which causes far-flung development and forces people to drive longer distances to get to work, to get groceries, to take children to school, or to engage in other activities. A well located dwelling might save significant household travel costs and therefore improve overall family economics, even if the rent is higher than a dwelling in a poorer location. A 2012 study led by Pembina Institute affirmed that the additional expenses of long-distance commuting often negated the savings associated with lower housing costs.

In both large metropolitan areas and regional towns where housing prices are high, a lack of affordable housing places local firms at a competitive disadvantage. They are placed under wage pressures as they attempt to decrease the income/housing price gap. Key workers have fewer housing choices if prices rise to non-affordable levels. Variations in affordability of housing between areas may create labour market impediments. Potential workers are discouraged from moving to employment in areas of less affordability. They are also discouraged from migrating to areas of high affordability as the low house prices and rents indicate low capital gain potential and poor employment prospects. Lack of affordable housing can make low-cost labour scarcer (as workers travel longer distances).

=== Public health and education ===
"In addition to the distress it causes families who cannot find a place to live, lack of affordable housing is considered by many urban planners to have negative effects on a community's overall health." Improving thermal comfort at home especially for houses without adequate warmth and for tenants with chronic respiratory disease may lead to improved health and promote social relationships. Housing cost increases in American cities have been linked to declines in enrollment at local schools.

The American Journal of Public Health recognizes homelessness as a public health issue. In a 2013 survey, a lack of affordable housing was the number one in the list of causes of homelessness among families with children and unaccompanied individuals. Studies through the Canadian Journal of Psychiatry have shown that access to rapid permanent housing with treatment, rehabilitation, and support services have led to a decrease in shelter and emergency department costs.

Affordable Housing is found to reduce the likelihood that a family will be forced to move due to financial challenges such as eviction, foreclosure, or rent increase. A study focusing on the effects of foreclosure on student academic performance within the Boston public school system, found a relationship that suggests foreclosures have a small negative association with individual students' test score and attendance, controlling for the student's previous test score or attendance. A 1996 technical report also found that teachers that teach students that have had to move with a high frequency have had to include a reduction in instructional pacing and more review to accommodate variation and uncertainty in student learning.

=== Affordable housing and sustainability ===
A new subsection of affordable housing has emerged: sustainable affordable housing. This type of affordable housing incorporates both environmentally friendly building practices and elements such as improved insulation and solar energy to lower both current and future environmental impact. This creates environmentally friendly housing for low-moderate income individuals and families with up to 30% lower utility bills. Improving the sustainability of affordable housing units is also found to increase economic value and comfort.

==== Strategies and approaches ====
A significant amount of research has been done on the topic of making sustainability affordable. One method emphasized is creating disaster-resistant affordable housing units to reduce the impact of climate change-related natural disasters. This method includes using weather-resistant housing materials and placing affordable housing units in disaster-resistant geographical locations. Another proposed method is the use of Frugal Innovation (FI), a cost-saving method involving removing unnecessary and complicating aspects of products and business models to reduce costs. In a review of over 480 publications on FI, David Mbabil Dok-Yen et al. found that FI has the potential to lower affordable housing building costs, which in turn reduces costs for the end consumer. A different study found cross-laminated timber (CLT) to be a safe and cost effective replacement for steel or concrete in building multi story buildings, which could reduce material costs for builders of apartments or condos.

==== Assessment and outcomes ====
The evaluation of sustainable affordable housing generally involves several factors, such as environmental performance, economic feasibility, and social outcomes. The sustainability of these developments is often assessed with metrics such as energy efficiency, long term cost savings, resident well-being, and environmental impact reduction.

One key factor for evaluation is upfront cost. Although sustainable building features often increase initial construction costs, this additional cost is frequently diminished over time through lower utility bills and operational costs. There are some downsides, however, including the fact that high upfront costs are often a barrier to widespread usage and the extent of savings depends on location, climate, and the specific strategies implemented.

Social outcomes are also a key component of the assessment of sustainable affordable housing. Improved insulation, ventilation, and access to green spaces have been associated with better physical and mental health outcomes.

Finally, environmental impact, including policy and certification systems, such as green building standards, are often used to evaluate and guide sustainable affordable housing projects. As the primary driving factor in sustainable movements, the impact on the environment is one of the most important measurements in the success of sustainable affordable housing projects. In a study on the relationship between sustainable and affordable housing found that setting clearer standards for energy usage and efficiency as well as location would help to reduce environmental stressors like greenhouse gas emissions.

Despite these efforts, there is still no universally accepted standard for evaluating sustainable affordable housing, leading to differences in how success is measured across different regions and projects.

=== Land values ===
According to a 2022 study, LIHTC projects in the United States increase land value in surrounding neighborhoods.

== Public policy ==
Policy makers at all levels – global, national, regional, municipal, community associations – are attempting to respond to the issue of affordable housing, a highly complex crisis of global proportions, with a myriad of policy instruments. These responses range from stop-gap financing tools to long-term intergovernmental infrastructural changes. There has been an increase among policy makers in affordable housing as the price of housing has increased dramatically creating a crisis in affordable housing. Additionally, the process of weighing the impacts of locating affordable housing is quite contentious and may have race and class implications.

Affordable housing policy has political, philosophical, and ethical elements. In the simplest of terms, affordability of housing refers to the amount of capital one has available in relation to the price of the goods to be obtained. Public policies are informed by underlying assumptions about the nature of housing itself. Is housing a basic need, a right, an entitlement, or a public good? Or is it just another household-level consumer choice, a commodity or an investment within the free market system? "Housing Policies provide a remarkable litmus test for the values of politicians at every level of office and of the varied communities that influence them. Often this test measures simply the warmth or coldness of heart of the more affluent and secure towards families of a lower socio-economic status." Among politicians homeowners are overrepresented. Homeowners tend to prefer policies which make housing less affordable.

To combat slums, homelessness, and other social and economic impacts of a housing unaffordability, many groups have argued for a "right to housing". Article 25 of the Universal Declaration of Human Rights recognizes the right to housing as part of the right to an adequate standard of living. Article 11(1) of the International Covenant on Economic, Social and Cultural Rights (ICESCR) also guarantees the right to housing as part of the right to an adequate standard of living. Many housing rights groups also attempt to combat social and political issues which relate to access to quality affordable housing such as housing discrimination, redlining, and lack of access to amenities in areas with affordable housing including food deserts and transit deserts.

=== Supply-side approaches ===
Policies that reduce housing cost though increased housing supply include favorable land use policies such as inclusionary zoning, relaxation of environmental regulations, and the enforcement of affordable housing quotas in new developments.

In some countries, such as Canada and the United States, municipal governments began to play a greater role in developing and implementing policies regarding form and density of municipal housing in residential districts, as early as the 1950s. At the municipal level, promoted policy tools include zoning permissions for diverse housing types or Missing Middle Housing types such as duplexes, cottages, rowhouses, fourplexes, and accessory dwelling units. Some municipalities have also reduced the amount of parking that must be built for a new structure to reduce land acquisition and construction costs. Other common strategies include reducing permitting costs and wait times for new housing, permitting small-lot development, multi-family tax exemptions, density bonuses, preserving existing affordable housing, and transit-oriented development.

Existing housing that is affordable may be used, instead of building new structures. This is called "Naturally Occurring Affordable Housing", or NOAH.

In a housing cooperative people join on a democratic basis to own or manage the housing facility in which they live. Generally these housing units are owned and controlled collectively by a corporation which is owned and controlled jointly by a group of individuals who have equal shares in that corporation. In market rate cooperatives owners can accumulate equity and sell their share of the corporation at market rate. In a limited-equity housing cooperative there are restrictions on the profits members can earn from selling their share (such as caps on sale price) to meant to maintain affordable housing.

Community land trusts are nonprofit corporation that holds land, housing, or other assets on behalf of a neighborhood or community. A community land trust acquires and maintains ownership of the land through a not-for-profit that holds the land in a trust. Homeowners then purchase or build a home on land trust property but do not purchase the land thus reducing costs. If the homeowner sells, they may be limited on what they may sell the home for or the family may earn only a portion of the increased property value with the remainder kept by the trust to preserve affordable housing There are over 225 community land trusts in the United States.

==== Right to build ====
An article by libertarian writer Virginia Postrel in the November 2007 issue of Atlantic Monthly reported on a study of the cost of obtaining the "right to build" (i.e. a planning permission, red tape, bureaucracy, etc.) in different U.S. cities. The "right to build" cost does not include the cost of the land or the cost of constructing the house. The study was conducted by Harvard economists Edward Glaeser and Kristina Tobio. According to the chart accompanying the article, the cost of obtaining the "right to build" adds approximately $600,000 to the cost of each new house that is built in San Francisco. The study, cited, published by Ed Glaeser and Joseph Gyourko, reached its conclusion about the value of the right to build in different localities based on a methodology of comparing the cost of single-family homes on quarter-acre versus half-acre lots to get a marginal land price and then comparing the selling price of homes to construction costs to get a price for the land plus other costs, with the difference between the two being attributed to the cost of zoning and other local government permitting and regulations.

==== Government restrictions ====
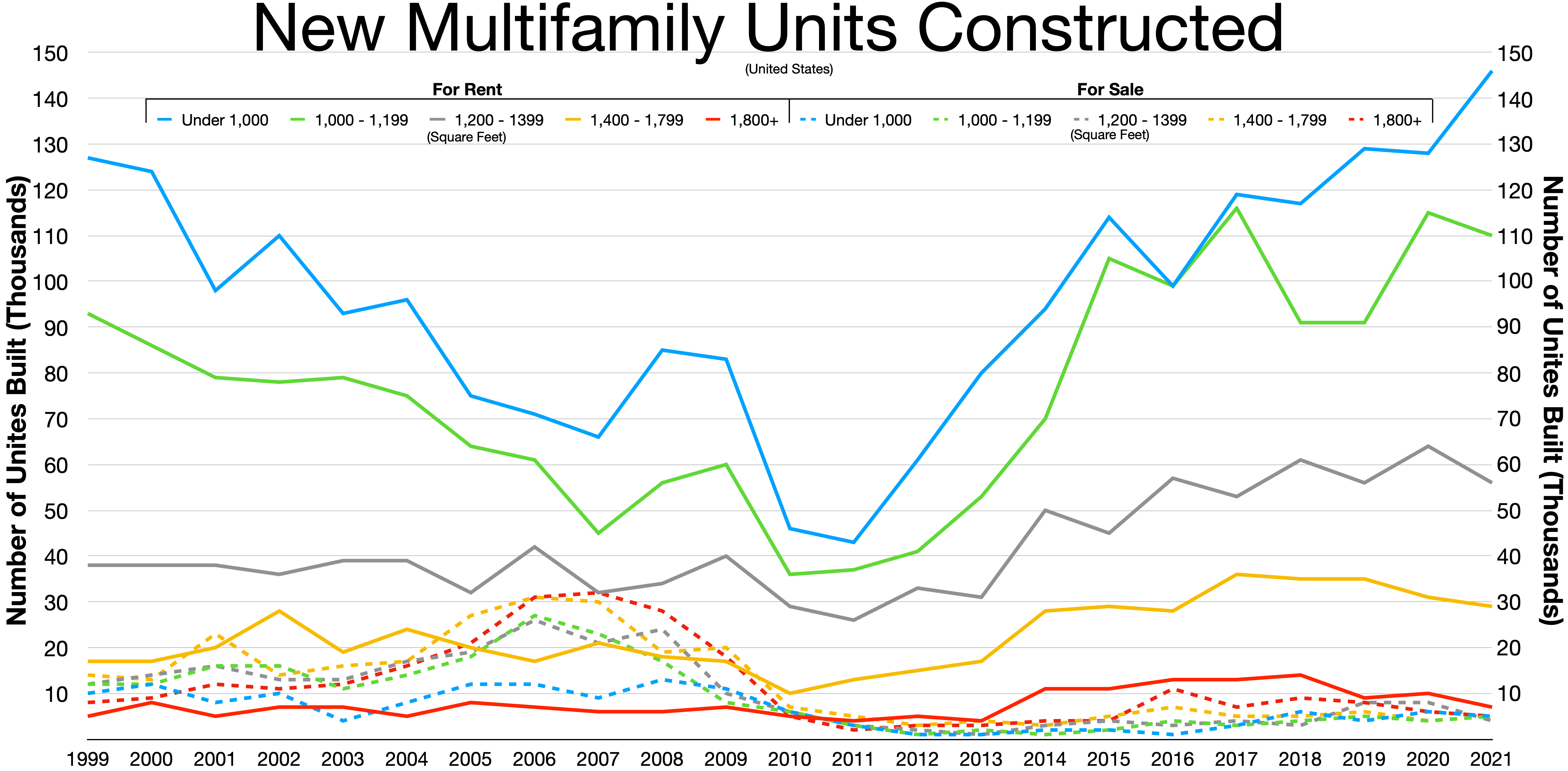
New Multifamily Units Constructed For Rent: Under 1,000 ft^{2}; 1,000–1,199 ft^{2}; 1,200–1,399 ft^{2}; 1,400–1,799 ft^{2}; 1,800+ ft^{2}; For Sale: Under 1,000 ft^{2}; 1,000–1,199 ft^{2}; 1,200–1,399 ft^{2}; 1,400–1,799 ft^{2}; 1,800+ ft^{2}

Many governments put restrictions on the size or cost of a dwelling that people can live in, making it essentially illegal to live permanently in a house that is too small, low-cost or not compliant with other government-defined requirements. Generally, these laws are implemented in an attempt to raise the perceived "standard" of housing across the country. This can lead to thousands of houses across a country being left empty for much of the year even when there is a great need for more affordable housing; such is the case in countries like Sweden, Norway, Finland and Denmark, where there is a common tradition to have a summer house. This sometimes raises concerns for the respect of rights such as the right to use one's property.

In the United States, most cities have zoning codes that set the minimum size for a housing unit (often 400 square feet) as well as the number of non-related persons who can live together in one unit, resulting in having "outlawed the bottom end of the private housing market, driving up rents on everything above it." In California in 2021, researchers estimated that parking requirements increase the cost of building affordable housing by up to $36,000 per unit, and up to $75,000 per unit in cities like Los Angeles and San Francisco. Until 2018, in Los Angeles, for an affordable housing development to be allowed to be built, it required a "letter of acknowledgement" from the city councilperson in whose district it would be constructed. This allowed city council members to block affordable housing developments in their district without having to give any reason.

In 2021, former President Joe Biden launched the Emergency Housing Vouchers program (EVH) as part of the American Rescue Plan Act, developed post the COVID-19 pandemic to assist Americans experiencing domestic violence, homelessness, and human trafficking. On March 6, 2025, the U.S. Department of Housing and Urban Development (HUD) issued a letter announcing that funding for the program is expected to end by of 2026.

=== Demand-side approaches ===
One potential means of addressing affordable housing is through public policy instruments that focus on the demand side of the market, programs that help households reach financial benchmarks that make housing affordable. This can include approaches that simply promote economic growth in general – in the hope that a stronger economy, higher employment rates, and higher wages will increase the ability of households to acquire housing at market prices. Federal government policies define banking and mortgage lending practices, tax and regulatory measures affecting building materials, professional practices (ex. real estate transactions).

Decreased demand can contribute to lower rent prices.

=== Subsidy-based approaches ===
Subsidies can alleviate housing costs and expenses, while increasing demand for housing. Subsidy-based approaches may take the form of government sponsored rental subsidies, government sponsored rental supplements, tax credits, or housing provided by a non-for-profit. The purchasing power of individual households can be enhanced through tax and fiscal policies that result in reducing the cost of mortgages and the cost of borrowing. Public policies may include the implementation of subsidy programs and incentive patterns for average households. For the most vulnerable groups, such as seniors, single-parent families, the disabled, etc. some form of publicly funded allowance strategy can be implemented providing individual households with adequate income to afford housing.

Some forms of subsidies can increase housing supply. In a mutual-aid housing cooperative, a group of families forms a cooperative to collectively build, own, and manage land by participating in the process of constructing the housing for the cooperative. Each family is responsible for contributing labor towards the construction of the housing complex to reduce costs and members take on responsibilities before, during, and after the construction. The Uruguayan Federation of Mutual Aid Housing Cooperatives (FUCVAM) has completed nearly 500 housing cooperatives housing more than 25,000 families.

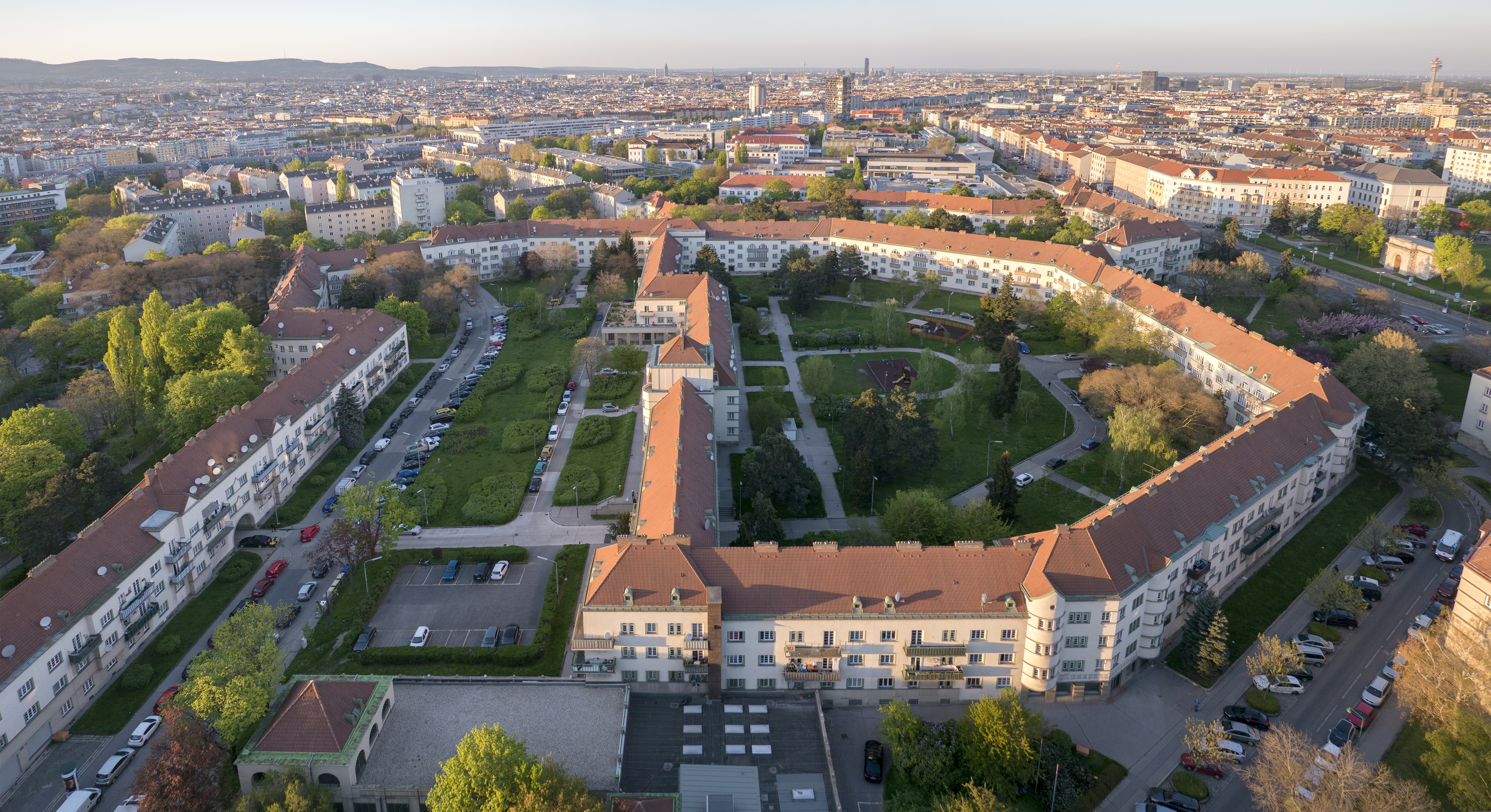
The George-Washington-Hof is protected public housing in Vienna.

=== Public, state, or social housing approaches ===
Public housing is a form of housing tenure in which the property is usually built and owned by a government authority, either central or local. In some countries, public housing is focused on providing affordable housing for low-income earners while in others, such as Singapore, citizens across a wide range of incomes live in public housing. In Vienna, Austria, social housing may be completely government built and run or include a mixture of public land and private-sector construction and management. Combined, the two types of housing represent about 46 percent of the city's housing stock (26% government owned and managed and 20% a public/private partnership) and house people with a wide variety of incomes. In South Korea the public Korea Land & Housing Corporation has provided homes to 2.9 million households which is 15% of the national total of 19.56 million households. This includes 2.7 million newly built public housing units and 1.03 million rental homes of which 260,000 were purchased or rented by the Land and Housing Corporation.

=== Design-based approaches ===
==== Containerized housing units ====
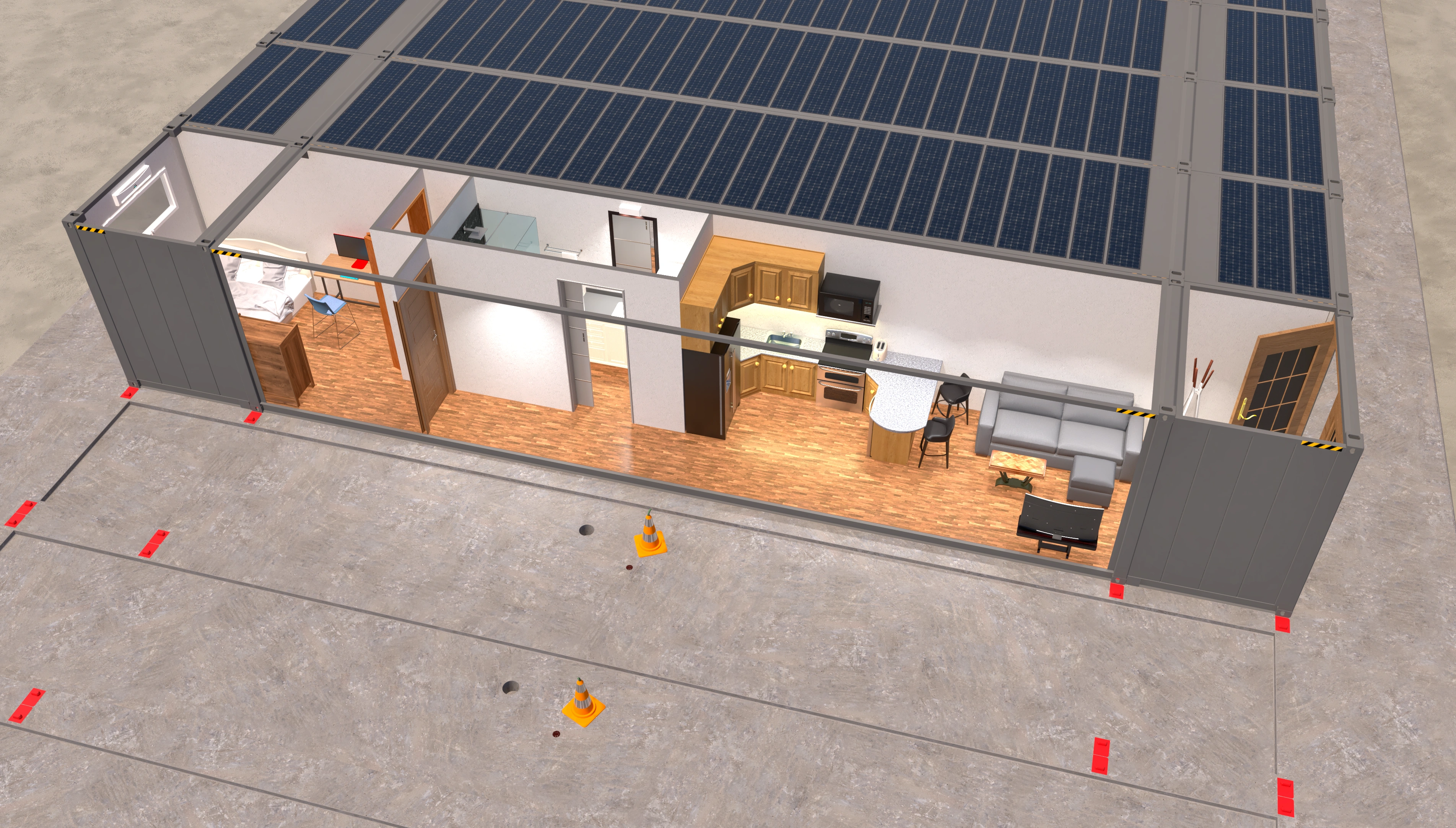
53-foot reefer container home

Containerized housing units are pre-fabricated housing units built out of shipping containers or similar containers. They can be stacked or connected to make a larger home, or to make a block of multi-family housing. Reefer containers or refrigerated containers are containers built to haul refrigerated or frozen products. Compared to standard shipping containers, they have good insulation in the walls, ceiling, and floor, so they maintain a more comfortable temperature.

==== Triple decker triplex ====
Modern triple decker triplex concept with standing seem metal roof with thin film solar. The left and right side doors go to the 2nd and 3rd floors respectively.

Triple-decker triplex housing is more prominent in the New England area and became popular in the late 19th century and early 20th century with the immigration from Europe during that time. Each floor is separately owned or rented out. If they are owned like a condo an HOA maintains ownership of the outside and yard.

==== Over-1s ====
5-over-1s down to 1-over-1 buildings have the parking spaces below the living spaces and allow for higher density building, because parking lots take up a lot of space and on street parking limits the density of zoning for a particular lot.

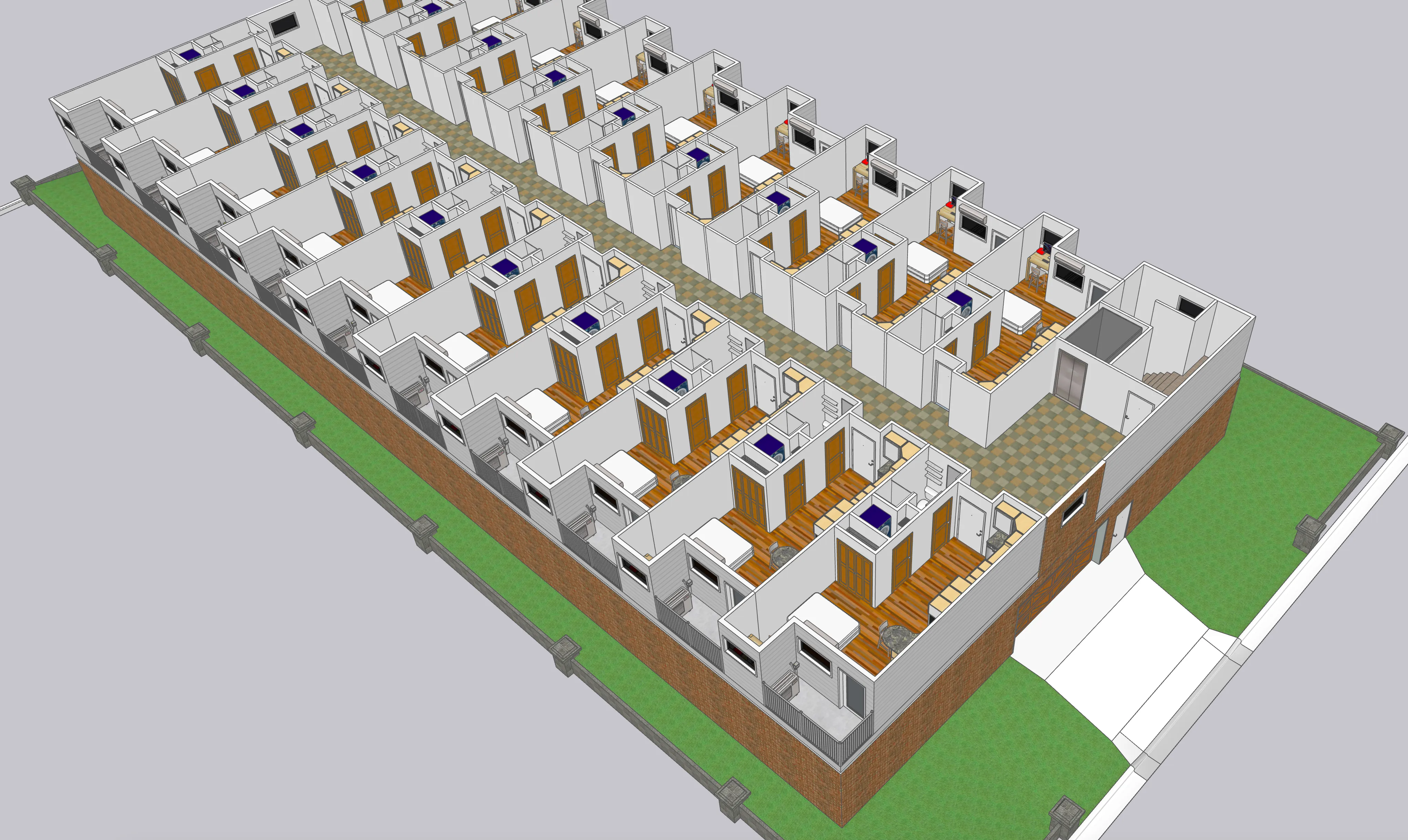
1-over-1 studio condos

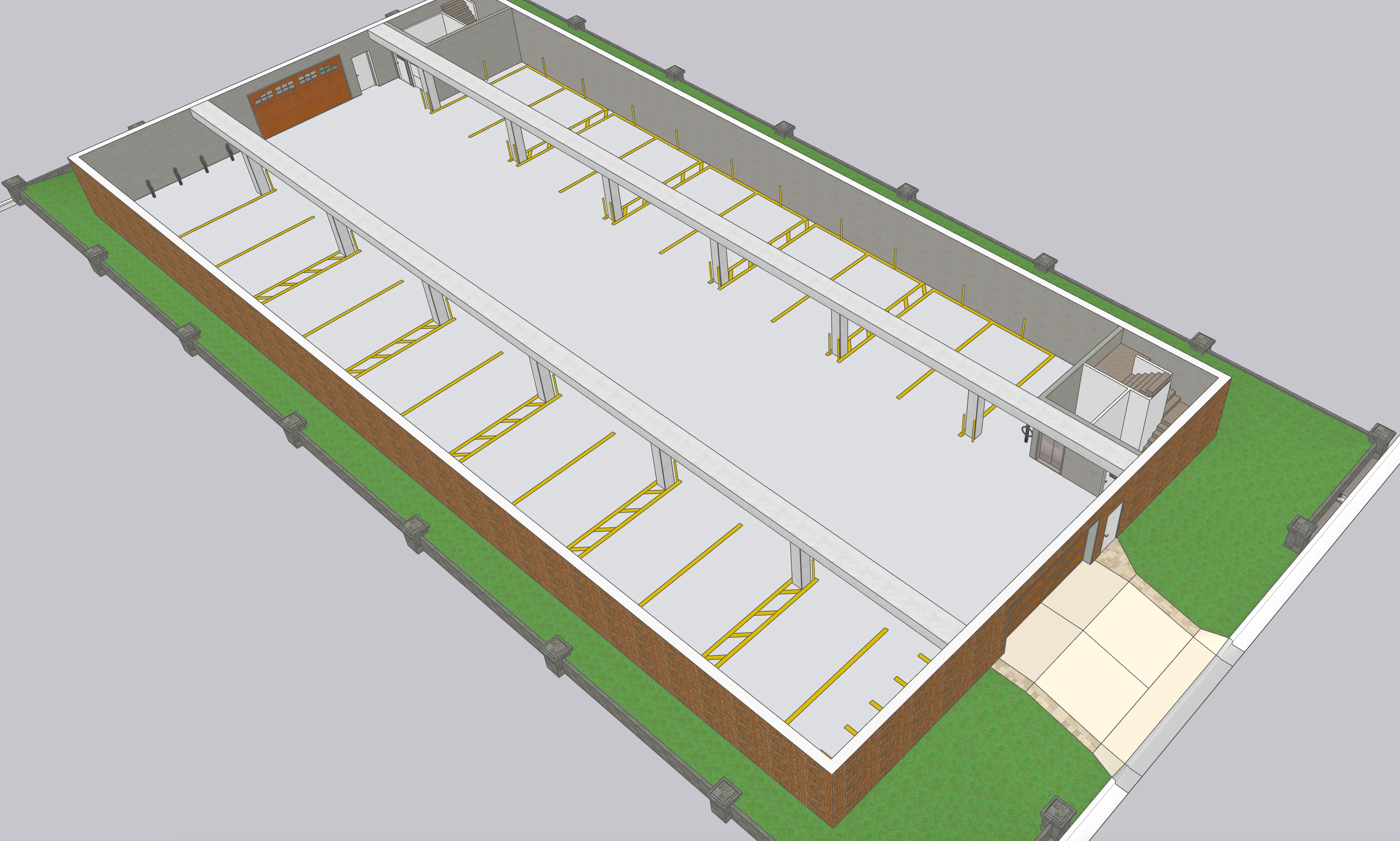
Parking and utilities down below

19 studio condos and 22 parking spaces below
Heat pump on the balcony

==== Adaptive reuse ====
In the United States, "adaptive reuse" has been proposed by affordable housing experts as a way to increase the supply of affordable housing. As opposed to new construction, adaptive reuse involves the repurposing of old structures into housing or mixed-use developments. This is considered more sustainable than building new because the developed structures already exist as underused, abandoned, or functionally obsolete buildings. Adaptive reuse has also been described as less expensive than new construction.

According to 2023 estimates, 90 percent of U.S. real estate growth by 2033 will entail the adaptive reuse of existing buildings rather than new construction.

==== Self-built (owner-built) housing ====
Low-tech, low-cost, traditionally designed, sustainable, self-built homes can enable individuals to construct affordable, healthy housing using local materials. The process may be assisted by free-to-access plans optimised for single-person construction, that are also easily adapted to a broad variety of locations and climates. An example of this approach is the Tasmanian House project in Australia.

== Affordable housing by country ==
Different countries and cities throughout the world have found unique ways to respond to the need for affordable housing. In some provinces within China, for example, local governments have instituted "tradable land quotas." These quotas allow developers to construct new housing units at the outer bounds of the city limits, and, in return, land outside of the city is protected from development. On the other hand, in Los Angeles, the city government recently instituted legislation that allows motels to be transformed into affordable housing units, regardless of zoning regulations. In Brussels, an architectural firm was able to repurpose a soap factory, creating affordable housing units that included one- to 6-bedroom apartments, studios, lofts, and duplexes. These residential units are also energy-efficient, so have both social and environmental benefit.

While innovative building practices have been incredibly successful in countries such as Nigeria and India, cities in more developed countries have found unique ways to increase affordable housing in dense urban areas through partnerships with private developers. For example, in Germany, cities including Berlin and Hamburg have established partnerships with private developers to construct new affordable housing units. In a 2011 agreement, developers in Hamburg agreed to build 3,500 new housing units per year and 30% of these units would only be available to low and middle income households. To support the developer's work, Hamburg's city government agreed to provide city-owned land and acquire privately owned land on which the units would be constructed. Additionally, Hamburg modified urban planning regulations in locations occupied predominantly by low-income individuals to simplify the process of affordable housing construction. Conversely, in Berlin, the Alliance for Housing Construction, which was established in 2014, brought together Berlin's local government, private landlords, and public utility landlords to make rental units in the city more affordable. Public utility landlords such as non-profit organizations agreed to build 3000 new dwellings each year. Between 300 and 1000 of these units would be provided as "non-serviced rents." Additionally, private landlords agreed to construct 6000 units each year, and between 600 and 1200 of these units would be provided as "non-serviced rents."

== Notable people ==
- Trudy McFall, 1994 co-founder and Chairman of "Homes for America"

== See also ==
- Subsidized housing
- Sídlisko or Panelák
- Housing estate
- Alternative housing
- Informal housing
- Modular building
- Non-profit housing
- Real estate appraisal
- Recreational vehicles
- Single-room occupancy
- Tiny house movement
