= Construction trailer =

Portable building used in construction

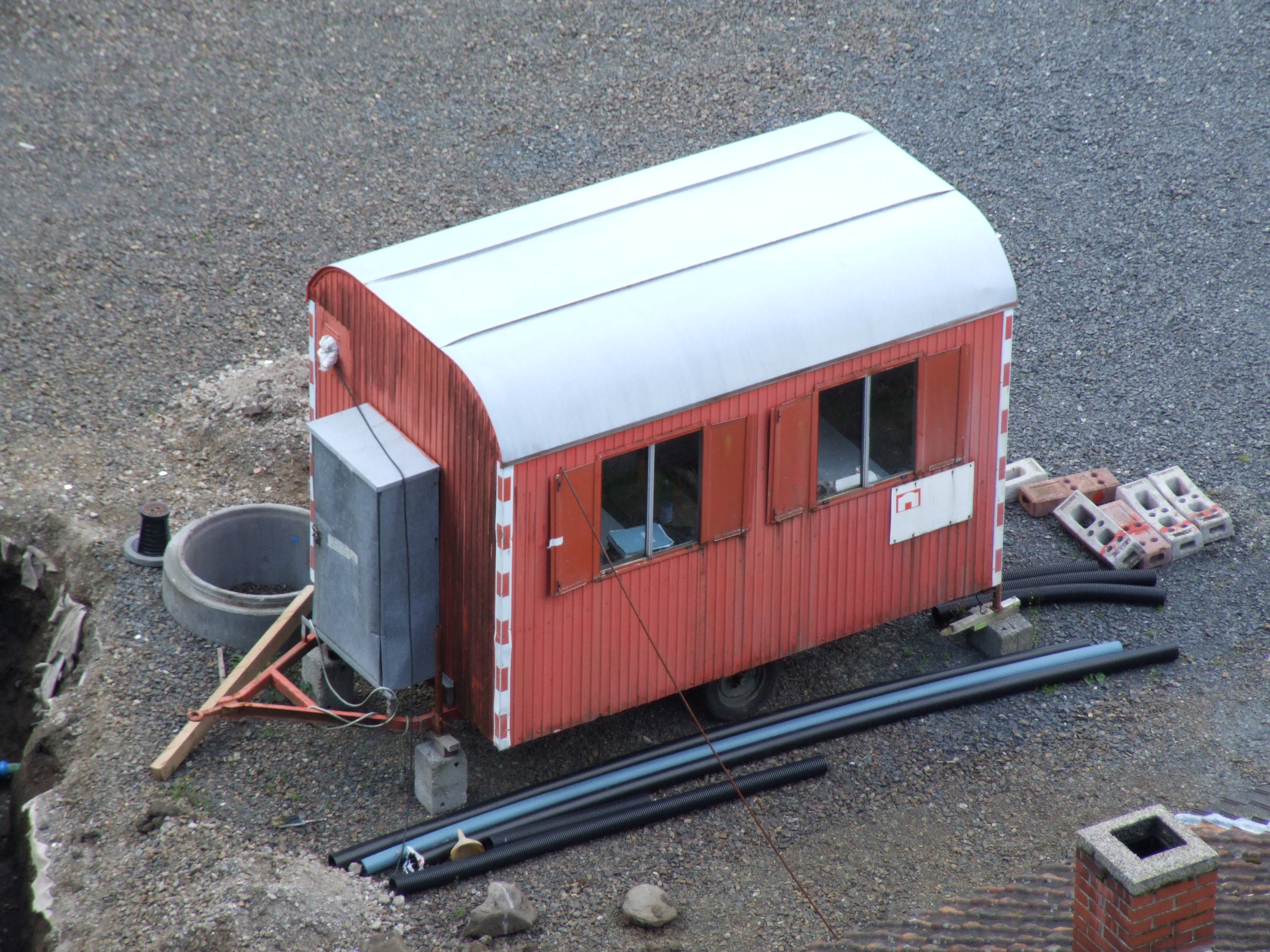
One-axle construction trailer

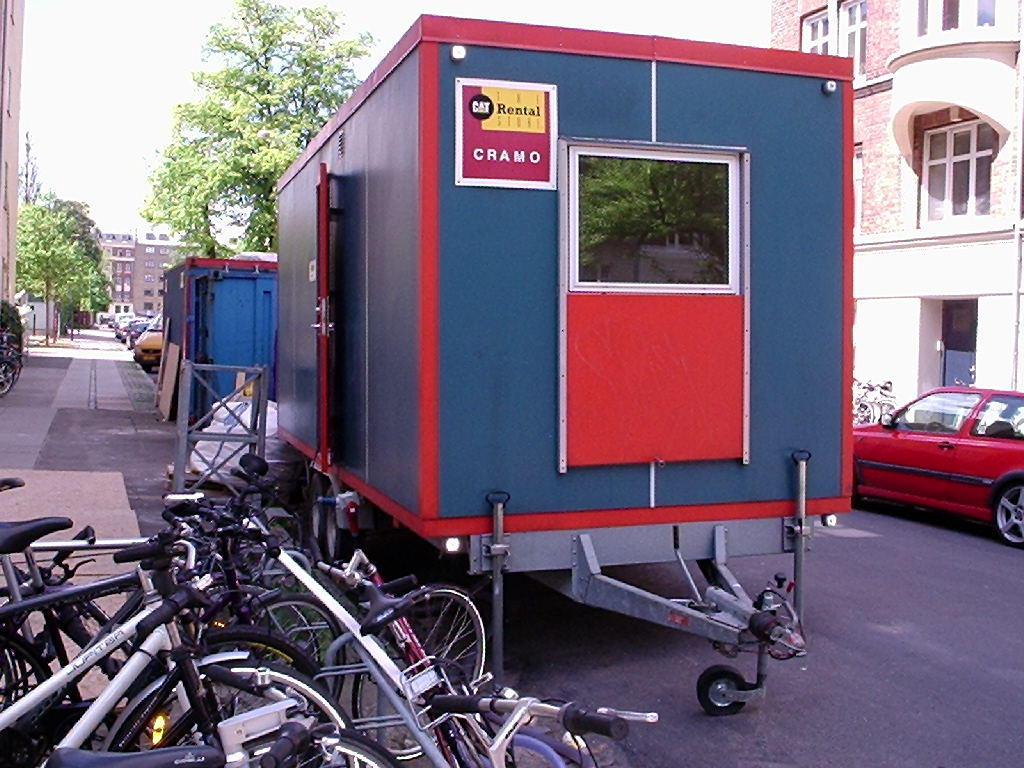
Modern construction trailer

Construction trailers are mobile structures (trailers) used to accommodate temporary offices, dining facilities and storage of building materials during construction projects.

== Hook-ups ==
Typically, trailers need to be equipped with telephone lines and electrical power. Lavatories are usually provided for separately. They are often skid-mounted, on trailers, or put on piles. Construction trailers are often manufactured using traditional stick-frame construction. Intermodal containers are also being converted into construction trailers.

== Use in different countries ==
=== United States ===
Municipalities can require the use of construction trailers to be subject to permit proceedings. The City of Fremont, California, for example, publishes its permit requirements on its municipal website. Enclosed Cargo Trailers are a very popular tool used by many in the construction industry. Keeping equipment and materials clean and dry are a high priority to anyone in the construction industry. These trailers are very user friendly and are multipurpose. Hauling generators, ladders, air compressors and other small to medium-sized power tools from one job site to the next is a necessity. Construction trailers are ordinarily moved by heavy trucks but may also be moved by rail.

=== Europe ===
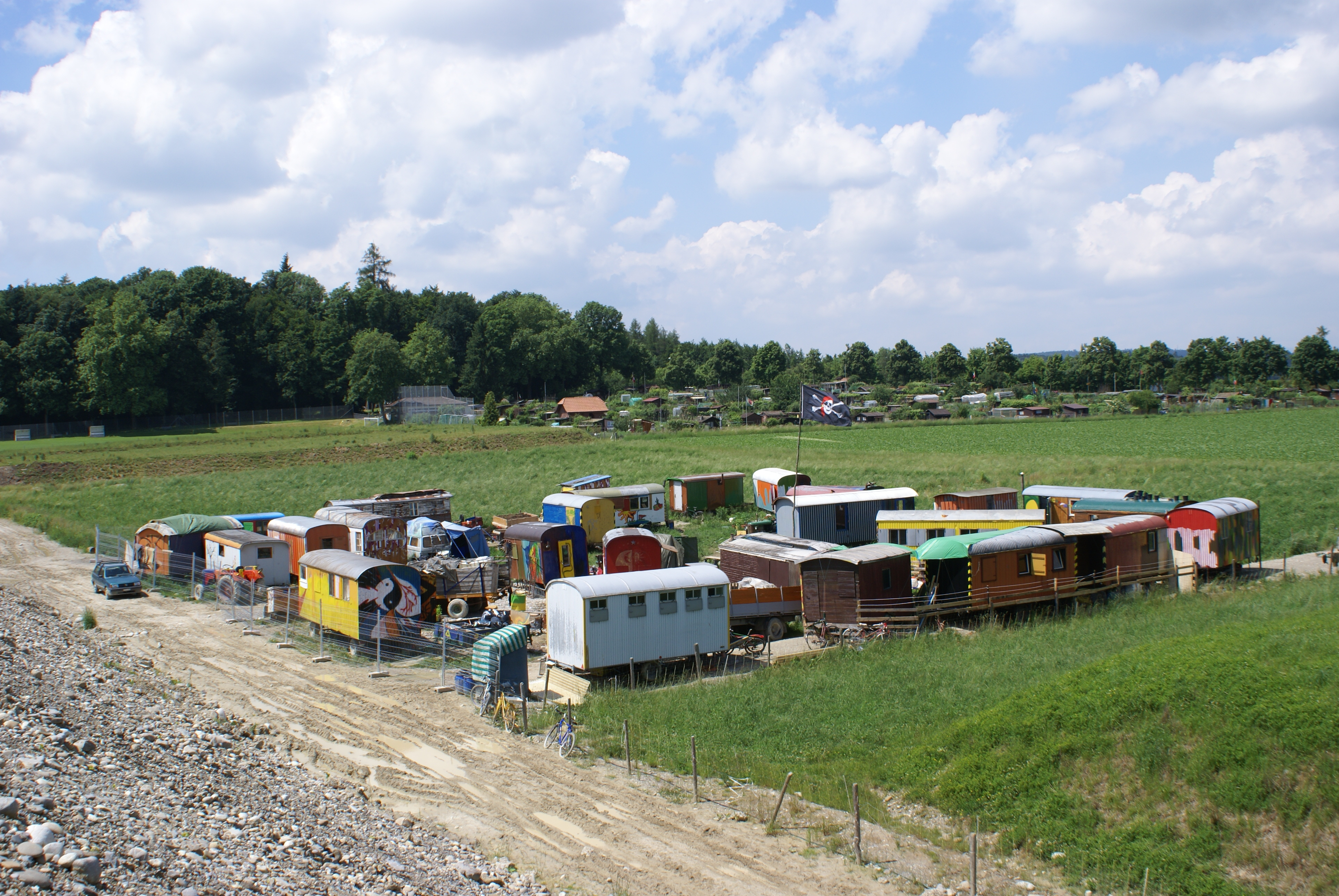
Wagenburg with several construction trailers in Switzerland

There are people in Europe, especially in German-speaking Europe, who live in trailers of this type, and in German there are words for a congregation of these trailers, Bauwagenplatz and Wagenburg. These trailers, usually lacking modern-day comforts like heating, electricity, toilets and running water, have become a popular form of eco-friendly alternative lifestyle among people mainly from hippie, punk and environmentalist subcultures. The scene bears similarities and can be seen as a European counterpart to housetruckers and the Tiny-house movement.

In 2008 Norwegian media reported that two construction sites (of Byggmester Harald Langemyhr AS) had been housing Polish workers in construction trailers — 4 workers in each.

== See also ==
- Alternative housing
- Fulltiming
- Mobile home
- Portable building
- Tiny home movement
- Housetruckers
- Vandwelling
