= Portable classroom =

Type of classroom

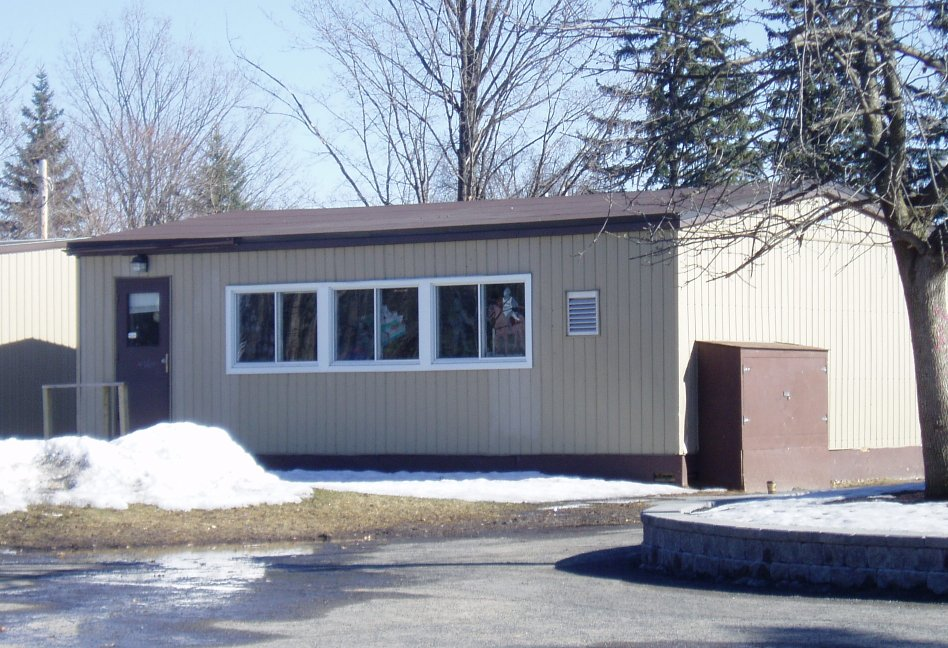
A portable classroom at Rockcliffe Park Public School in Ottawa, Ontario, Canada

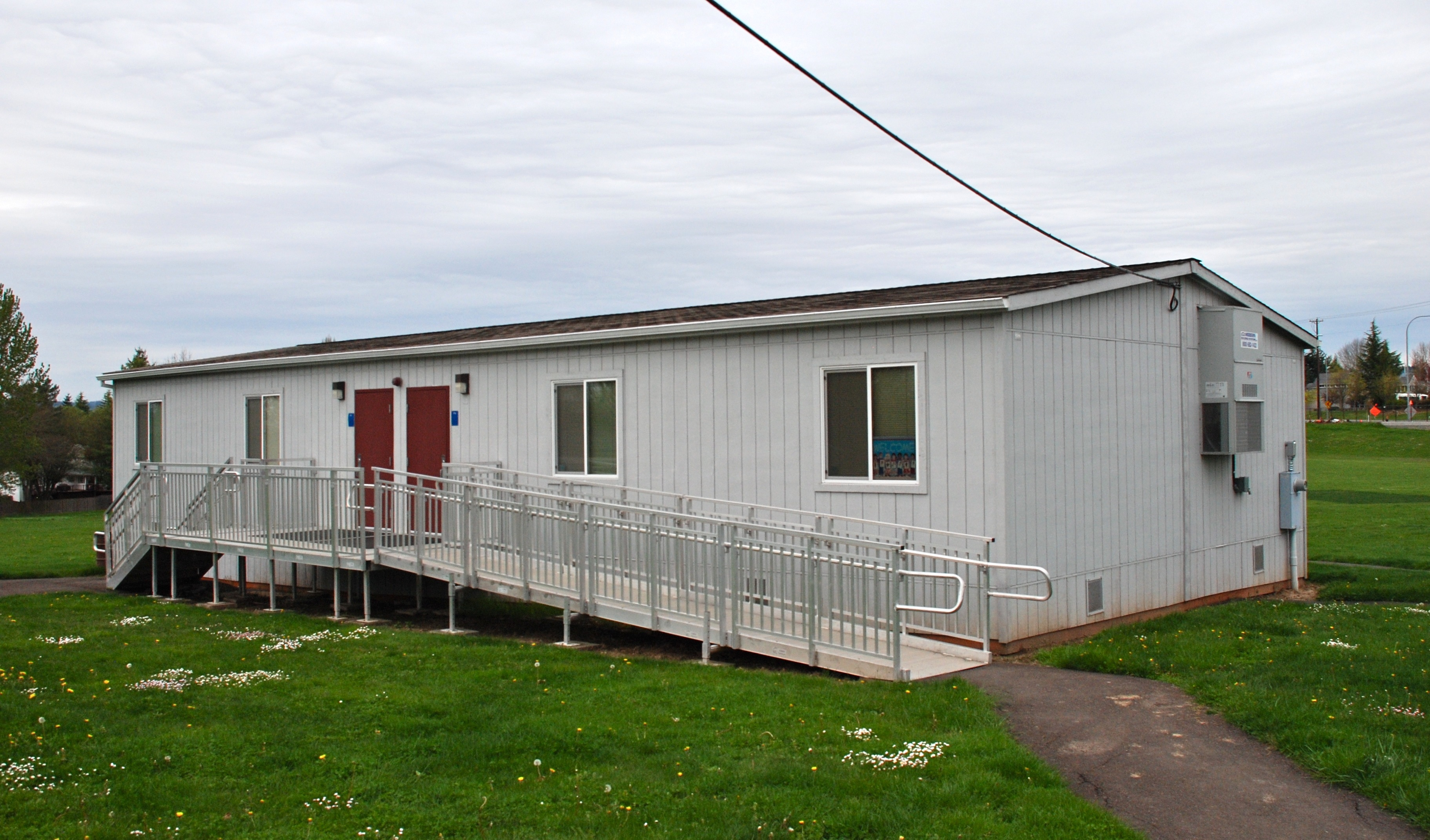
A portable classroom with wheelchair ramp at an elementary school in Washington County, Oregon, U.S.

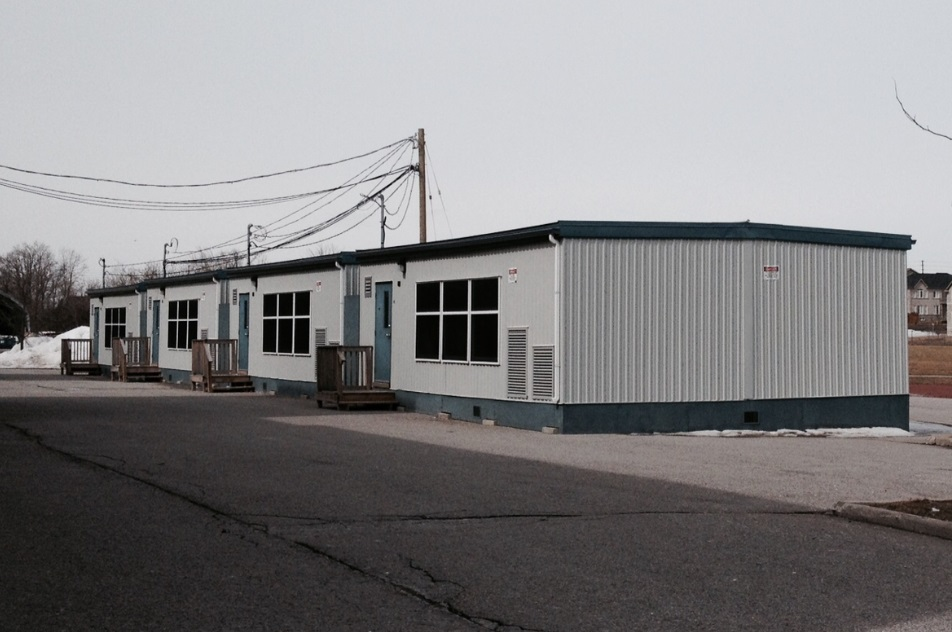
Portable classrooms at Pierre Elliott Trudeau High School in Markham, Ontario, Canada

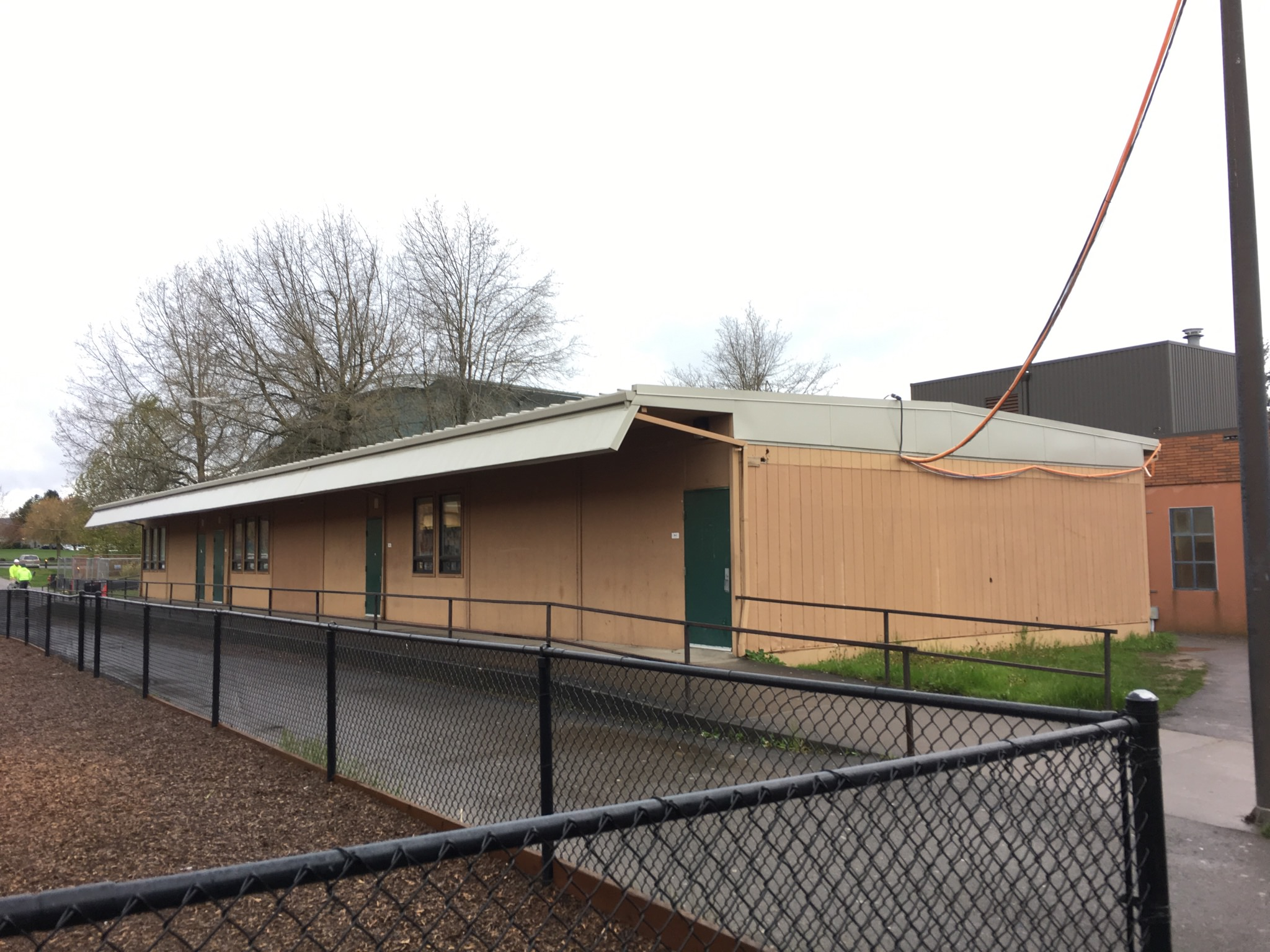
A four-room portable classroom at Reynolds High School in Troutdale, Oregon, U.S.

A portable classroom (also known as a demountable, relocatable classroom or portacabin (UK)), is a type of portable building installed at a school to temporarily and quickly provide additional classroom space where there is a shortage of capacity. They are designed so they may be removed once the capacity situation abates, whether by a permanent addition to the school, another school being opened in the area, or a reduction in student population. Such buildings would be installed much like a mobile home, with utilities often being attached to a main building to provide light and heat for the room. Portable classrooms may also be used if permanent classrooms are uninhabitable, such as after a fire or during a major refurbishment.

Sometimes, the portable classrooms are meant to be long-lasting and are built as a "portapack", which combines a series of portables and connects them with a hallway.

Portable classrooms are sometimes known as bungalows, slum classes, t-shacks, trailers, terrapins, huts, t-buildings, portables, mobiles, or relocatables. In the UK, those built in 1945–1950 were known as HORSA huts after the name of the Government's post-war building programme, "Hutting Operation for the Raising of the School-leaving Age". Others in the UK are often known as 'Pratten huts' after the Pratten company that supplied many of them after World War II.

== See also ==
- Modular building
- Modular design
- OpenStructures
