= Workamping =

Working (paid or volunteer) while camping

In the United States, workamping (a portmanteau word) is a combination of work and camping. A workamper combines part-time or full-time paid or volunteer work with RV or tent camping. Workampers generally receive compensation in the form of a free campsite, usually with free utilities and additional wages. Workamping positions can include working at campgrounds, RV resorts, mobile home communities, Christmas tree or pumpkin sales lots, amusement parks, motels/hotels, national parks, state parks, U.S. Army Corps of Engineer locations, national monuments, lighthouses, retail stores, food service, sales and more. Workamping is particularly popular among retirees. While year round workamping jobs do exist, many workamping positions are seasonal.

== See also ==
- Fulltiming
- Housetrucker
- Perpetual traveler
