= Fulltiming =

Term for motorhome use

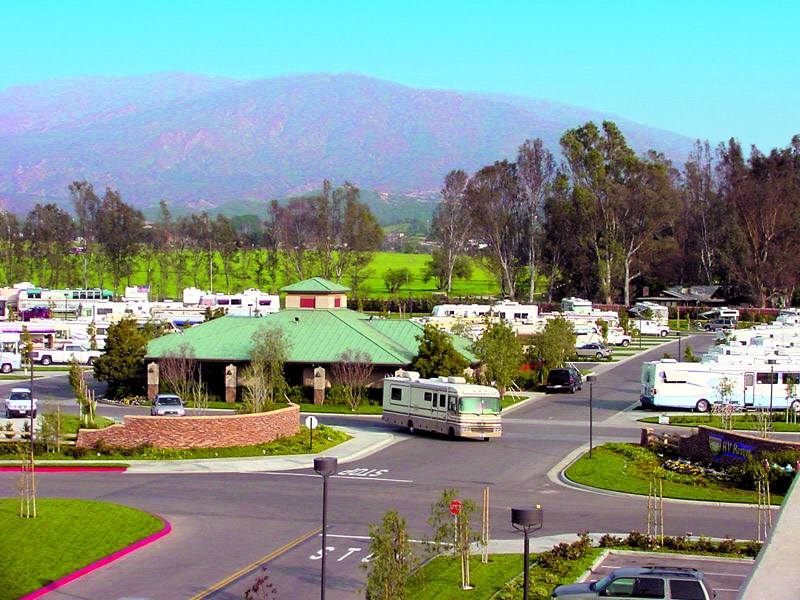
An American RV park

Fulltiming is a term used among motorhome individuals and families who live "full-time" in their motorhome or RV. Such mobile individuals are often called fulltimers. Fulltiming is a worldwide activity, and there are many bloggers who record their day-to-day life on the road. The term has been discussed in publications since around 1993.

Many are retired and just looking to do something different and see the world, but it is becoming increasingly common for young families to live, work and home school their children from their vehicle.

Individual fulltimers live different lifestyles. Some may choose to move their RV from one high-dollar camping resort to another. Some might volunteer or workcamp in order to trade labor for a campsite. Others might live off the grid and "boondock" (or "dry camp") full-time; in the United Kingdom this is known as "wildcamping" or "wildparking".

Fulltiming is becoming a popular way for single people and families to get a start in something that they own and avoid renting. Many people park their RV in one place and use it as a permanent residence.

== See also ==
- Snowbird (person)
- Digital nomad
- Vanlife
- Vardo (Romani wagon)
