= 12 Neighbours =

- Tiny house community
- Interactive map of 12 Neighbours
- Coordinates: 45°59′11″N 66°37′34″W
- Country: Canada
- Province: New Brunswick
- City: Fredericton
- Website: 12neighbours.com

12 Neighbours is a Canadian non-profit tiny house community in Fredericton, New Brunswick. Started in 2021 by multi-millionaire software engineer Marcel LeBrun, the community includes 96 tiny homes built between 2021 and 2024. LeBrun founded and funded the project, which was established as a means of combatting the homelessness and poverty crisis in the area. In early 2023, the project received $13 million in additional funding from the provincial and federal governments.
