= Marcel LeBrun =

Canadian businessman

- Education: University of New Brunswick
- Occupations: Entrepreneur, philanthropist
- Known for: Co-founder of Radian6; Founder of 12 Neighbours

Marcel LeBrun (born c. 1970) is a Canadian entrepreneur and philanthropist from New Brunswick. He is best known as the co-founder and former CEO of Radian6, a social media monitoring company acquired by Salesforce in 2011. He also founded the 12 Neighbours project, a tiny home community aimed at addressing homelessness in Fredericton.

== Life and career ==
Marcel LeBrun was born around 1970. He graduated from École Mathieu-Martin in Moncton, New Brunswick, and graduated from the University of New Brunswick in 1992 with a Bachelor of Science. He began working for NBTel and afterwards co-founded iMagicTV Inc., a video service company based in Saint John which, after being acquired in 2003 by Alcatel, led to LeBrun landing a vice president role in the company. In 2006, LeBrun co-founded Radian6, a social media marketing platform, with Chris Newton and Chris Ramsey. It had 350 employees at its peak before being acquired by Salesforce in 2011 for around US$326 million cash and $50 million in stock. After the acquisition, LeBrun served as a Senior Vice President for Salesforce and later became a venture partner with Real Ventures.

LeBrun founded 12 Neighbours, a non-profit housing initiative in Fredericton, to build affordable tiny homes for homeless individuals.
