= Tumbleweed Tiny House Company =

American construction company

- Founder: Jay Shafer
- Headquarters: Sonoma, California, United States
- Website: tumbleweedhouses.com

Tumbleweed Tiny House Company is a company in Sonoma, California, that designs and builds small houses between 65 and 887 square feet (6 and 80 m^{2}), Many are timber-framed homes permanently attached to trailers for mobility. The houses on wheels are available to be purchased ready made and shipped to consumers, and are individually manufactured and customized for their buyers. The company also offers construction plans for their mobile houses and larger designs, as well as workshops geared toward teaching people how to build their own cottage or tiny house on wheels.

Tumbleweed is part of the small house movement.

== History ==
Tumbleweed was founded in 1999 by Jay Shafer, and originally focused on sheds and chicken coops. In 2002, Shafer, co-founded the Small House Society in Iowa City, Iowa. In 2003, he was commissioned by Gregory Paul Johnson, Small House Society co-founder, to build The Mobile Hermitage, which became one of Tumbleweed's first commercially sold homes. That same year, the company began selling how-to books and hosting workshops about building tiny homes.

In the aftermath of Hurricane Katrina, a few were sold to Gulf Coast residents who preferred them to government-supplied temporary housing.

In 2007, Steve Weissman bought the company, after volunteering with them the year prior.

In 2008 the company reported selling only one house per year, though this had increased five-fold in 2009. As of 2011, the company reported building "only a few houses" annually. The majority of the houses built to its designs are constructed by customers using Tumbleweed's plans. In 2012, Shafer left the company and founded Four Lights Tiny House Company.

In 2012, the company's headquarters were moved to Sonoma, California, although the houses were manufactured in Colorado. In 2013, the company began to lean more into selling pre-manufactured homes. In 2015, they began to advertise tiny homes as a vacation experience.

Between 2011 and 2016, the company grew 50% each year, and its staff leapt from three people to 80 people. In 2016, it was the country's top tiny house manufacturer, building about 125 tiny homes each year.

In February 2017, the company's headquarters were moved to Colorado Springs, where it had a 20,000-square-foot factory.

== See also ==
- Sarah Susanka

== Bibliography ==
- Style, Small House (September 9, 2008). "Jay Shafer and the Tumbleweed Tiny House Company make small… BIG". Small House Style.
- LeMoult, Craig (March 31, 2006). "Anti-McMansions have every comfort of home". Chicago Tribune.
