= Sarah Susanka =

American architect

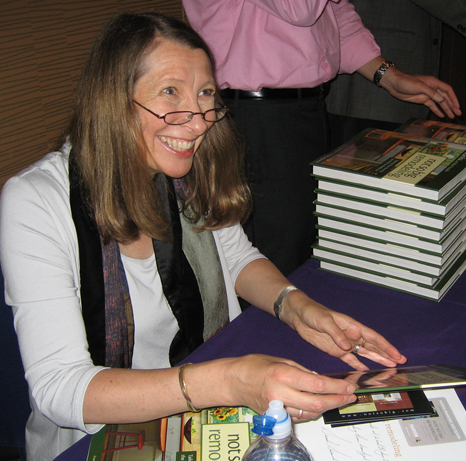
Sarah Susanka

Sarah Susanka FAIA (born March 21, 1957) is an English-born American-based architect, an author of nine best-selling books, and a public speaker. Susanka is the originator of the "Not So Big" philosophy of residential architecture, which aims to "build better, not bigger." Susanka has been credited with initiating the tiny-house movement.

== Biography ==
Susanka was born March 21, 1957, Knockholt, Kent, England, and moved to the US in 1971. After graduating from the University of Oregon, she settled in Minneapolis, Minnesota. She pursued a master's degree in architecture from the University of Minnesota while working for several architecture firms. Her thesis was the basis of her "Not So Big" books. She was a founding partner, along with her thesis advisor, of the Minneapolis-based residential architecture firm, Mulfinger, Susanka, Mahady & Partners (now known as SALA Architects) before leaving to pursue her writing and speaking career full-time. Her company is Susanka Studios.

She has been featured on The Oprah Winfrey Show, the Charlie Rose Show, and NPR's Diane Rehm Show, and her philosophies have appeared in various publications such as USA Today and The Wall Street Journal.

Susanka was dubbed "one of 18 innovators in American culture" by U.S. News & World Report in 1998. In 2004, Builder Magazine ranked her as No. 14 out of 50 "Power Brokers". She appeared on the "Environmental Power List" in Organic Style magazine that same year. In 2007, she received the Anne Morrow Lindbergh Award, an award given periodically to recognize "outstanding individual achievement, a spirit of initiative, and work that exemplifies great dedication toward making positive contributions to our world".

She is a registered architect and certified interior designer as well as a member of the College of Fellows of the American Institute of Architects and a Senior Fellow of the Design Futures Council.

== Design language ==
Susanka has proposed an approach to housing that values quality over quantity. She outlines a design language for homeowners, builders, and architects that is based on architectural elements such as framed openings (windows, doors, or doorways that are framed or nested in certain ways), spatial layering, visual weight, diagonal views, and variations to ceiling height, all of which are intended to let the interior of a house feel comfortable and more spacious. They are tools used to create a subjective feeling of separation and shelteredness yet interconnection with other parts of the house.

In her work she refers to the pattern language of Christopher Alexander. In the acknowledgements section of her book Not So Big House she refers to his book A Pattern Language, published 1977, as "inspiration for a generation of architects" as well as to her work.

== Books ==
The basic philosophy of quality over quantity, or "build better, not bigger," is described in great detail in Susanka's first book, The Not So Big House, which discloses her conceptual principles, and in seven of her following books, including Creating the Not So Big House, Not So Big Solutions for Your Home, Home By Design, Inside the Not So Big House, Outside the Not So Big House, Not So Big Remodeling, and More Not So Big Solutions for Your Home. She expands on her philosophy into how we live our lives in her seventh book, The Not So Big Life, focusing on "quality, not quantity" of time and life experience.

== Personal life ==
Susanka resides in North Carolina. She is a breast cancer survivor.

== Bibliography ==
- Susanka, Sarah; Obolensky, Kira (1998). The Not So Big House: A Blueprint for the Way We Really Live. Taunton Press. ISBN 1-56158-130-5. (2008 10th Anniversary Edition) ISBN 1-60085-150-9
- Creating The Not So Big House: Insights and Ideas for the New American Home (2000) ISBN 1-56158-377-4
- Not So Big Solutions for Your Home (2002) ISBN 1-56158-613-7
- Home By Design: Transforming Your House Into a Home (2004) ISBN 1-56158-618-8
- Inside the Not So Big House: Discovering the Details That Bring a Home to Life (2005) ISBN 1-56158-681-1
- Outside the Not So Big House: Creating the Landscape of Home (2006) ISBN 1-56158-734-6
- The Not So Big Life: Making Room for What Really Matters (2007) ISBN 978-1-4000-6531-8
- The Not So Big House: Home By Design DVD (2008) ISBN 1-60085-071-5
- Not So Big Remodeling: Tailoring Your Home to Fit the Way You Really Live (2009) ISBN 978-1-56158-827-5
- More Not So Big Solutions for Your Home (2010) ISBN 978-1-60085-148-3

== See also ==
- Small house movement
- Tumbleweed Tiny House Company
