= Optibo =

Optibo is the product of a collaboration between Swedish firms to solve the housing industry's problem of availability of space caused by high land prices. Optibo's main architect was inspired when he saw the Disney cartoon Mickey's Trailer on TV.

The project has led to the construction of an apartment which is only 25 square meters (270 square feet) in area. The single-room living space has the furniture built into the floor and the room can be changed from a living room to a bedroom, to a dining room, and back. The kitchen area is affixed to the wall and does not change.
