= Tiny-house movement =

Architectural movement advocating smaller living spaces

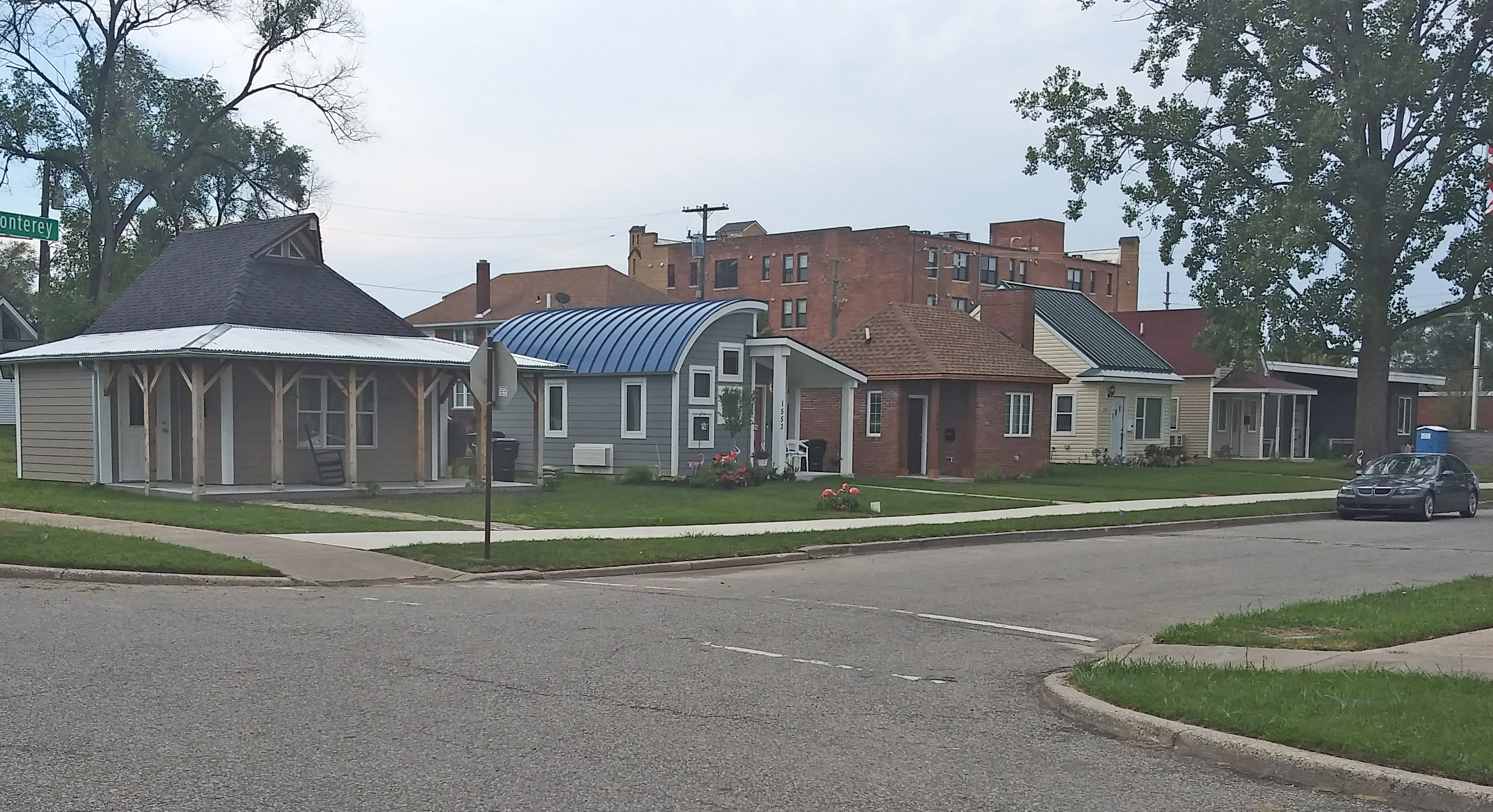
Tiny homes in Tiny Homes Detroit

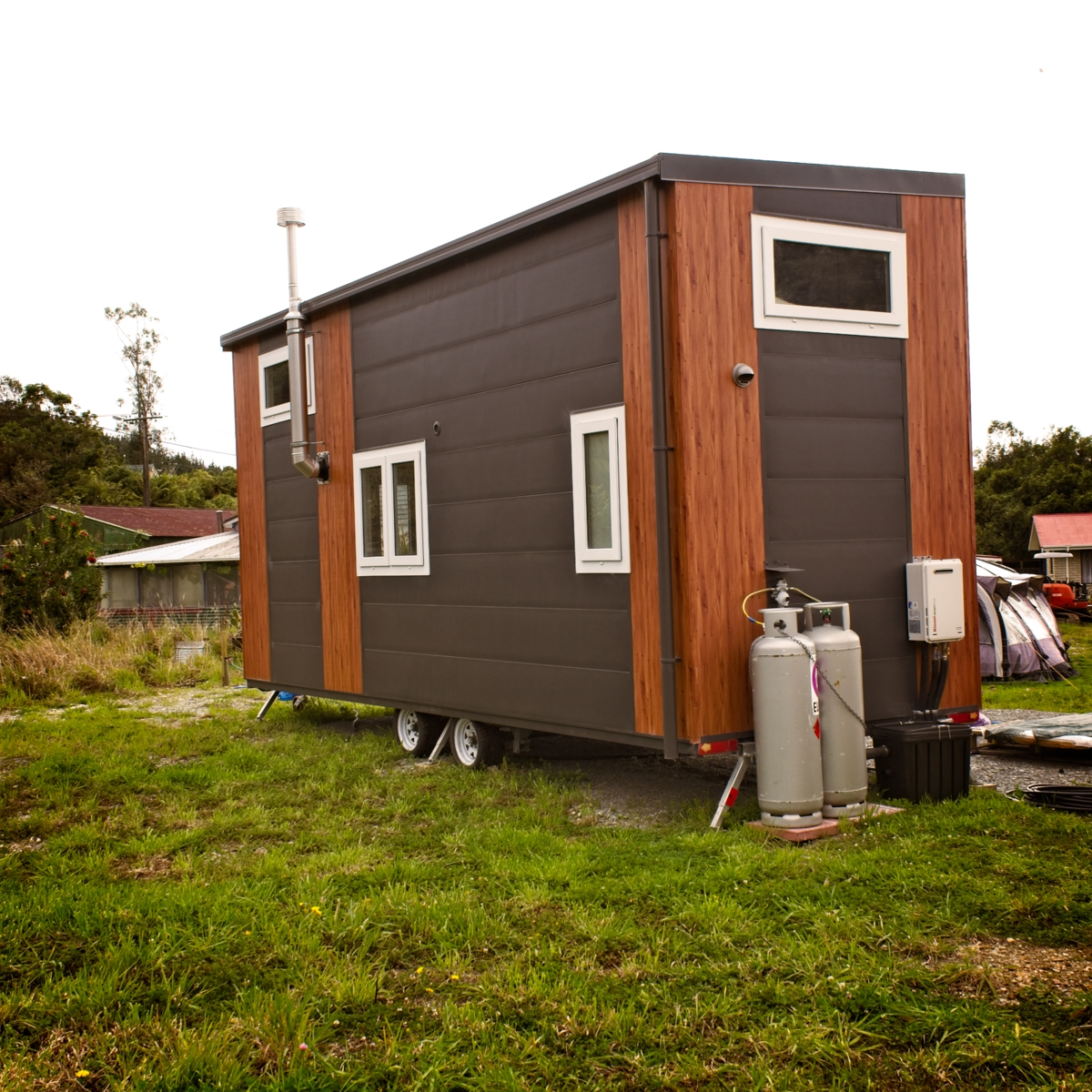
Semi-mobile tiny house in New Zealand

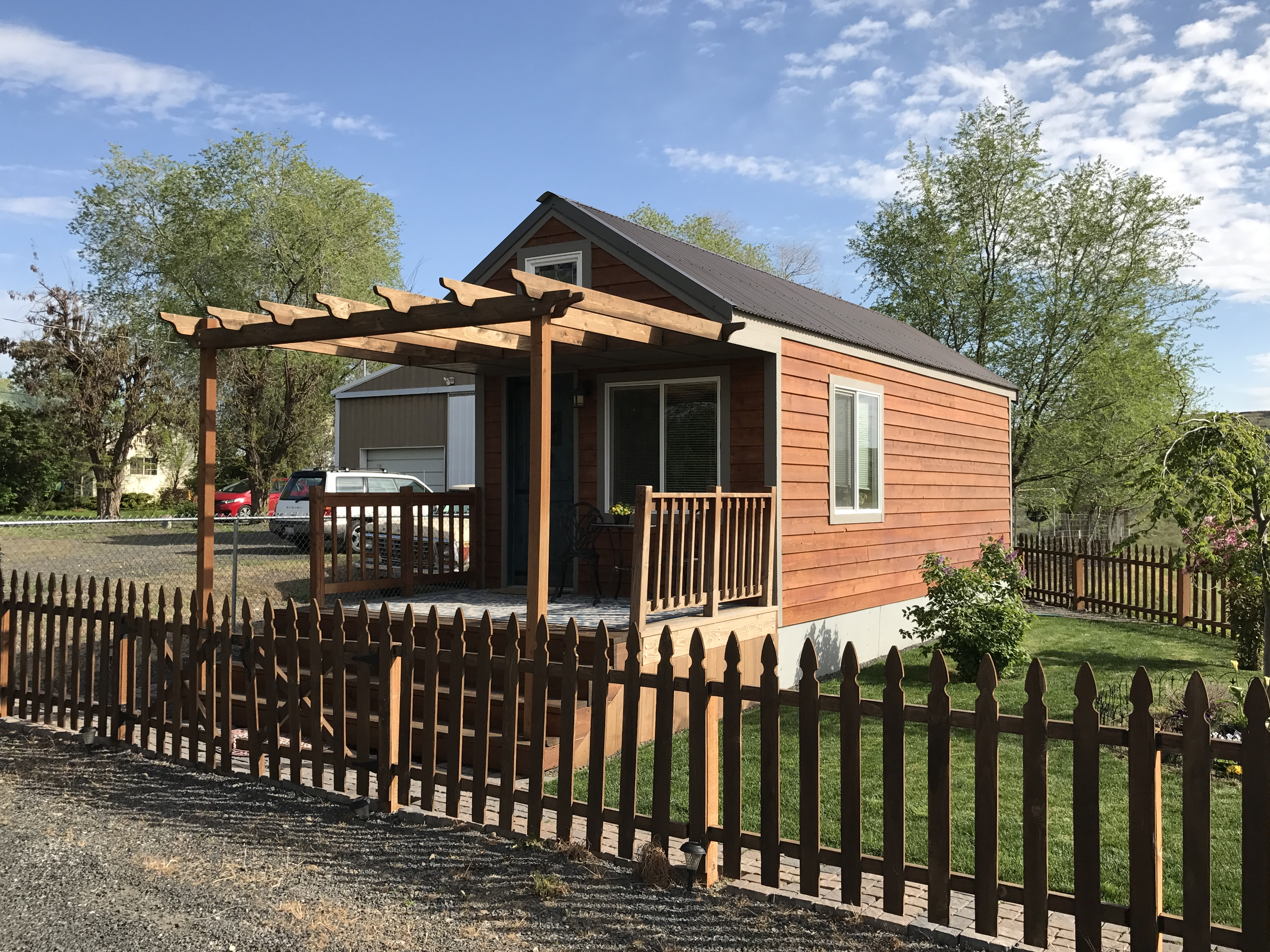
Tiny house with cottage style (10x24 ft)

The tiny-house movement (also known as the small house movement) is an architectural and social movement promoting the reduction and simplification of living spaces. Tiny homes have been promoted as offering lower-cost and sometimes eco-friendly features within the housing market, and they have also been promoted as an option for homeless individuals. However, the lack of clearly defined features and legality in many cases can cause issues for ownership, including being more expensive for the amount of area, vulnerability to natural disaster, lack of storage, difficulty hosting, smaller or lacking traditional home appliances, and legal and or zoning issues.

There is some variation in defining a tiny home, but there are examples and they are usually based on floorspace. The International Residential Code states that a tiny house's floorspace is no larger than 400 square feet (37 m^{2}). Merriam-Webster says they can be up to 500 sq ft (46 m^{2}). One architectural firm used a threshold of 600 sq ft (56 m^{2}) to define a tiny home. What further complicates the definition is that tiny homes may or may not be mobile, and lack clearly defined features.

== Introduction ==
The tiny home movement started in the late 1990s has grown through the 2020s. The movement's core involves living full-time in a very small floorspace building. In some cases, tiny houses are very small houses with a foundation, plot, and traditional sewage and electrical hookups, while in other cases, they are more mobile, similar to an RV or mobile home. Types of tiny houses include shipping container homes, small houseboats, bus conversions, and more.

Tiny homes have gained popularity among people trying to downsize, and in areas of short-term rentals, disaster relief housing, and homeless relief housing. Small houses are also used as accessory dwelling units (ADUs) to serve as additional on-property housing for aging relatives or returning children, as a home office, or as a guest house. The national median cost of a tiny house in 2019 was $60,000 but could run much higher depending on features. A 2024 Fidelity survey found that 73% of Americans say they would consider living in a tiny home, due to affordability and the appeals of a minimalist lifestyle.

In several incidents, tiny house owners have found themselves in a legal gray area. In one case in Canada, tiny home owners got into legal trouble due to a local issue with property rules for homes versus RVs. Another challenge of tiny houses is that they can be pricier per square foot than regular-size homes.

In the 2010s and 2020s, television shows featuring various aspects of tiny houses became popular, and tiny homes trended on social media, especially Instagram. For the most part, tiny homes have not gained widespread adoption, and have remained a niche market: In Grist, Eve Andrews wrote: "You’re more likely to encounter one while scrolling through $300-a-night Airbnb listings than browsing Zillow."

== Precursors of tiny homes ==
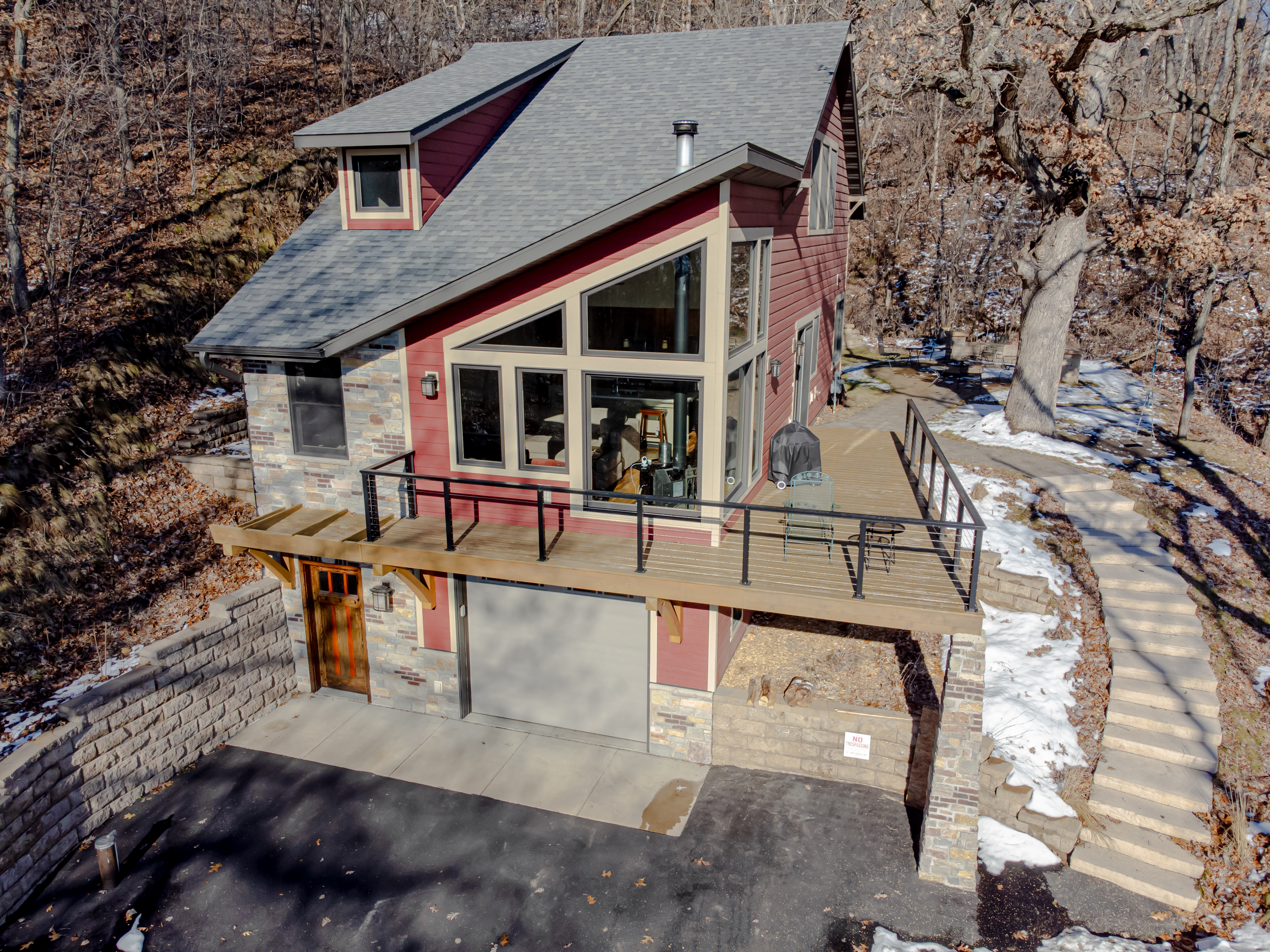

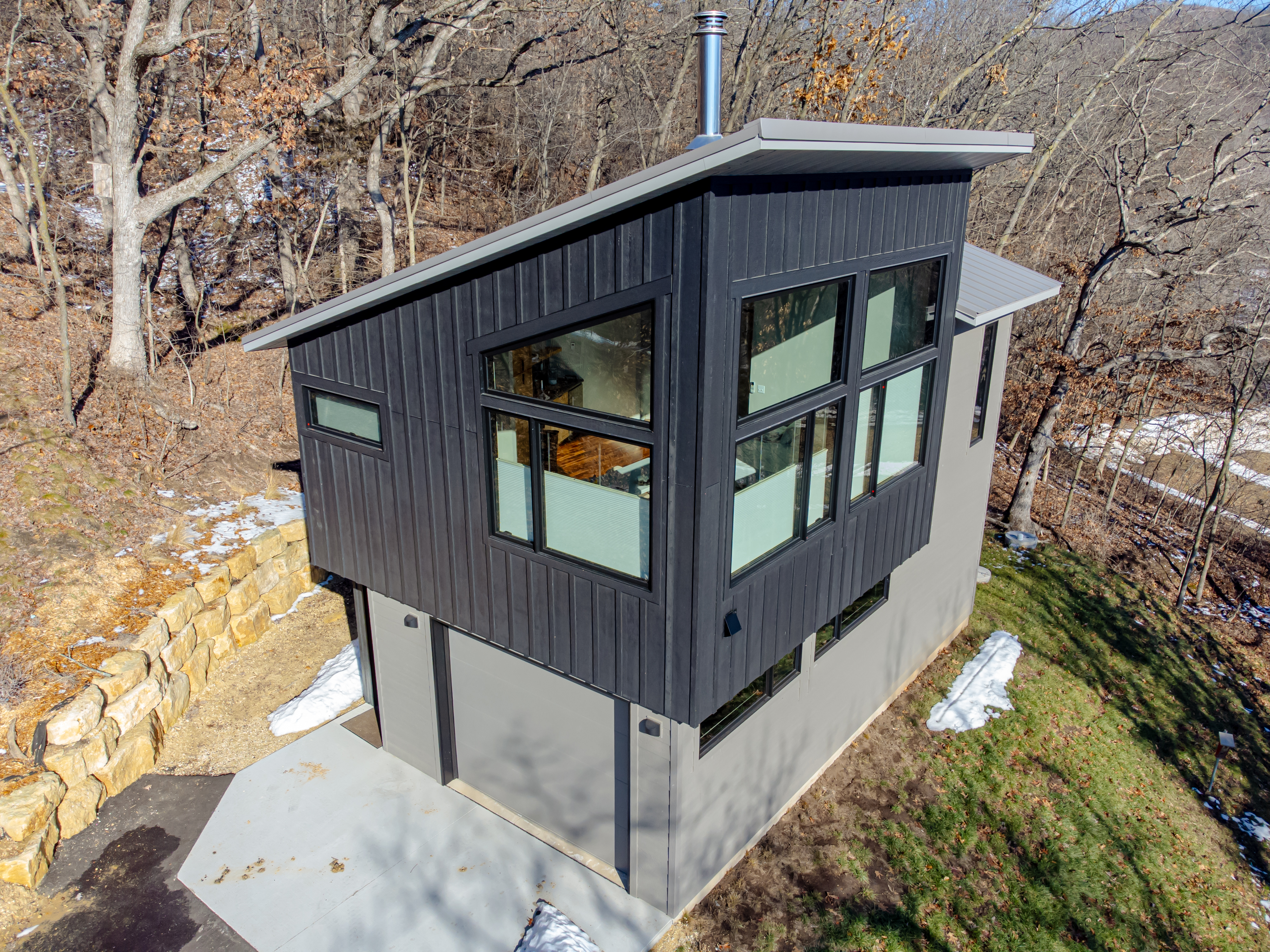
Tiny homes with a 1-car garage

Henry David Thoreau and his 1854 book Walden are often quoted as an early inspiration for the tiny-house movement. From the late 19th century through the Great Depression, shotgun shacks were small, single-story buildings in use among Americans in cities. Although few such houses contained more than two bedrooms, they provided accommodation for blue-collar families in southern U.S. cities like New Orleans.

The modern movement is considered to have started in the 1970s, with artists, such as Allan Wexler, investigating the idea of contemporary compact living. Early pioneers include Lloyd Kahn, author of Shelter (1973), and Lester R. Walker, author of Tiny Houses (1987). Sarah Susanka started the "counter-movement" for smaller houses, something she details in her book The Not So Big House (1997).

In 1999, Jay Shafer built the first modern tiny home — a 90-square-foot (8.4 m^{2}) mobile tiny home — and founded the Tumbleweed Tiny House Company In 2002, Shafer, Greg Johnson, Shay Salomon, and Nigel Valdez founded the Small House Society, which advocates for the tiny house movement. Salomon and Valdez also published a guide to the modern tiny-house movement, Little House on a Small Planet, in 2006, and Johnson published his memoir about living in a tiny house, Put Your Life on a Diet, in 2008.

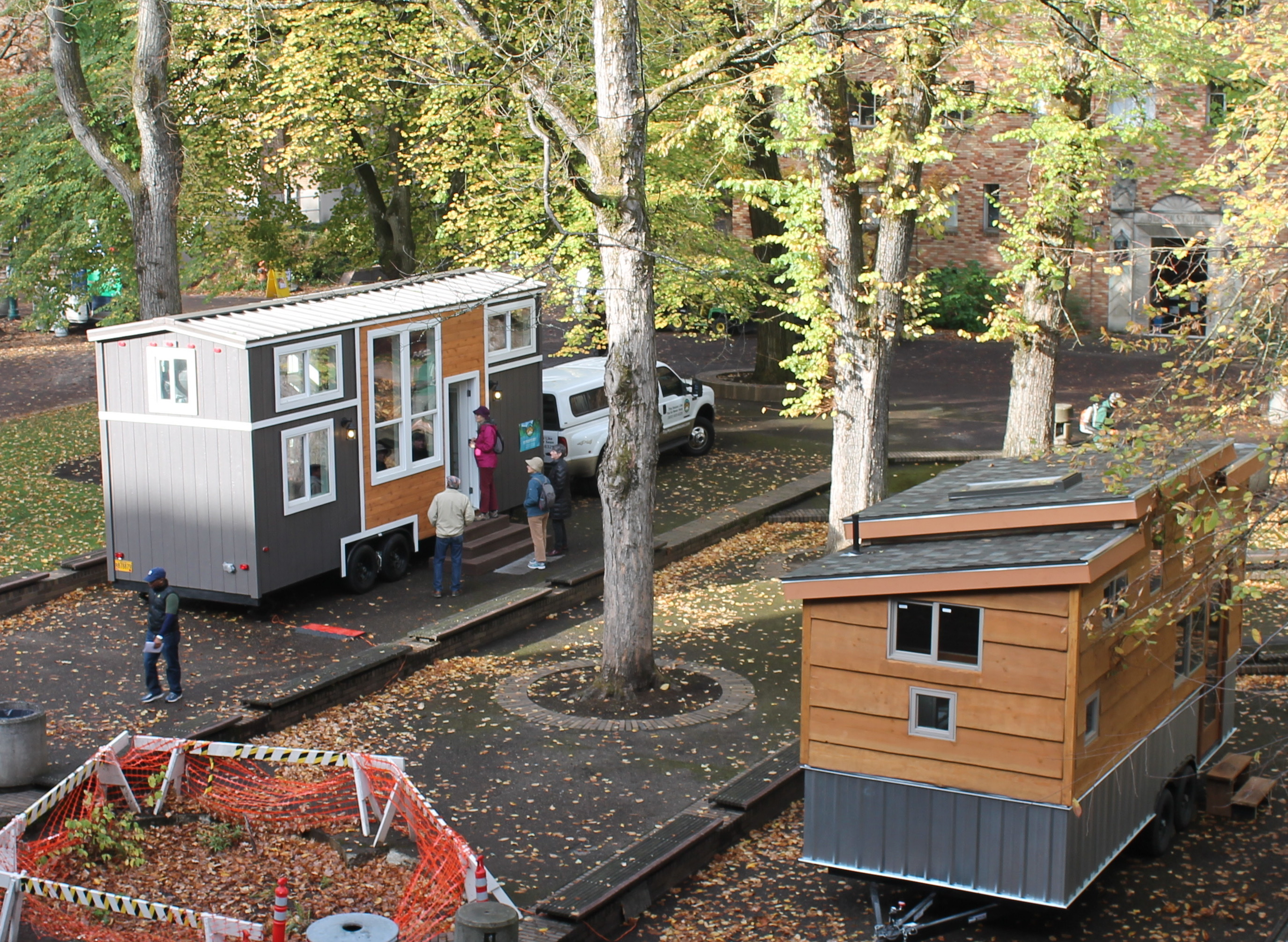
Tiny houses on display in Portland, Oregon

With the Great Recession affecting the economy of the United States from 2007 to 2009, the tiny-house movement appeared to gain momentum. Nonetheless, tiny-house purchases remained a minimal percentage of real estate transactions, with only approximately 1% of total home buyers acquiring houses qualified to be labeled as tiny homes. In fact, the average size of newly constructed homes in the United States continued to grow — from 1,780 sq ft (165 m^{2}) in 1978 to 2,479 sq ft (230.3 m^{2}) in 2007, and further still to 2,662 sq ft (247.3 m^{2}) in 2013.

In 2013, the Tiny House Fair in Yestermorrow, Vermont, was organized by Elaine Walker. Two years later, she founded the non-profit American Tiny House Association. Tiny houses received considerable media coverage during this time, with a television show on the movement, Tiny House Nation, airing in 2014, alongside the similar program Tiny House Hunters.

== Globally ==
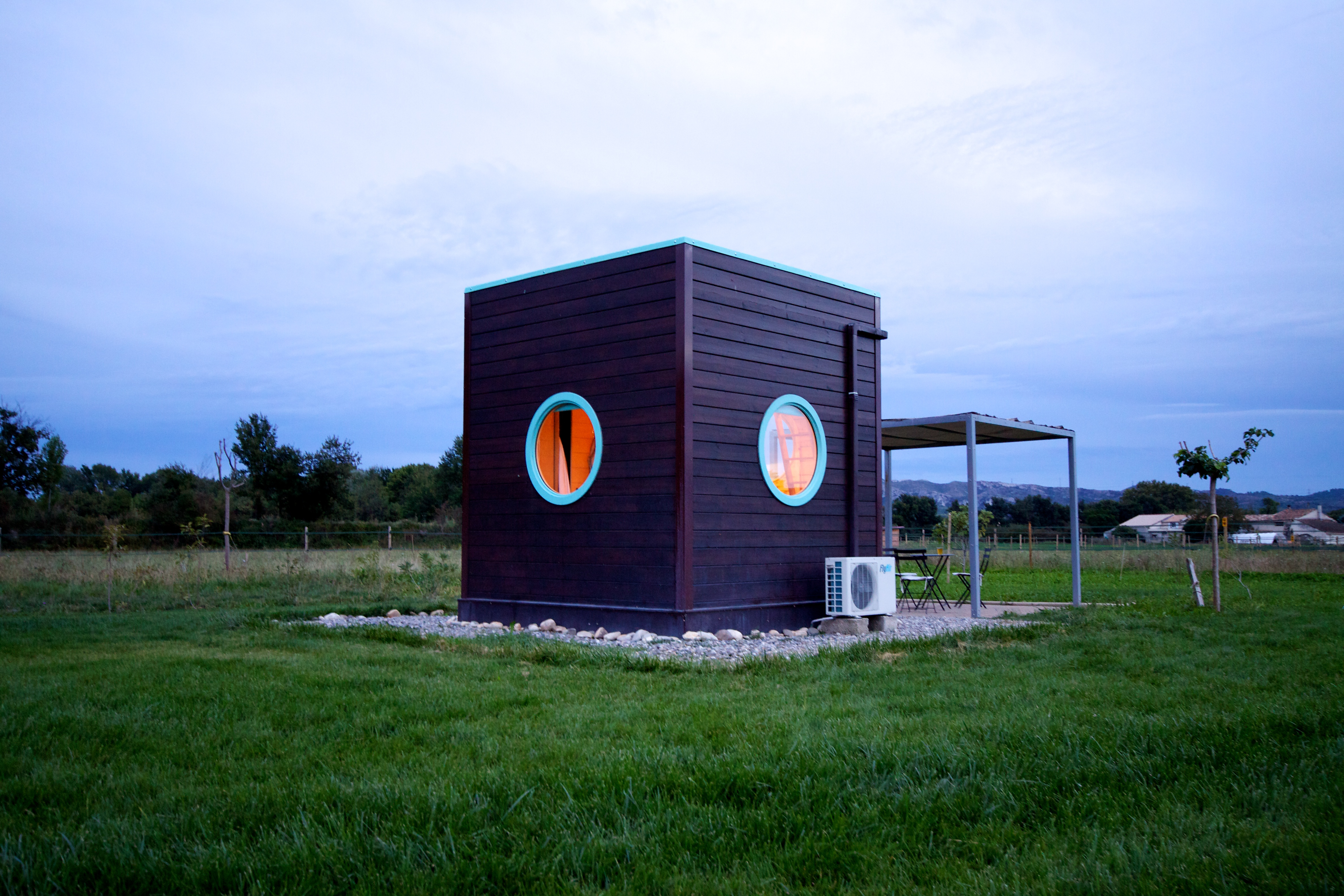
Tiny house in France

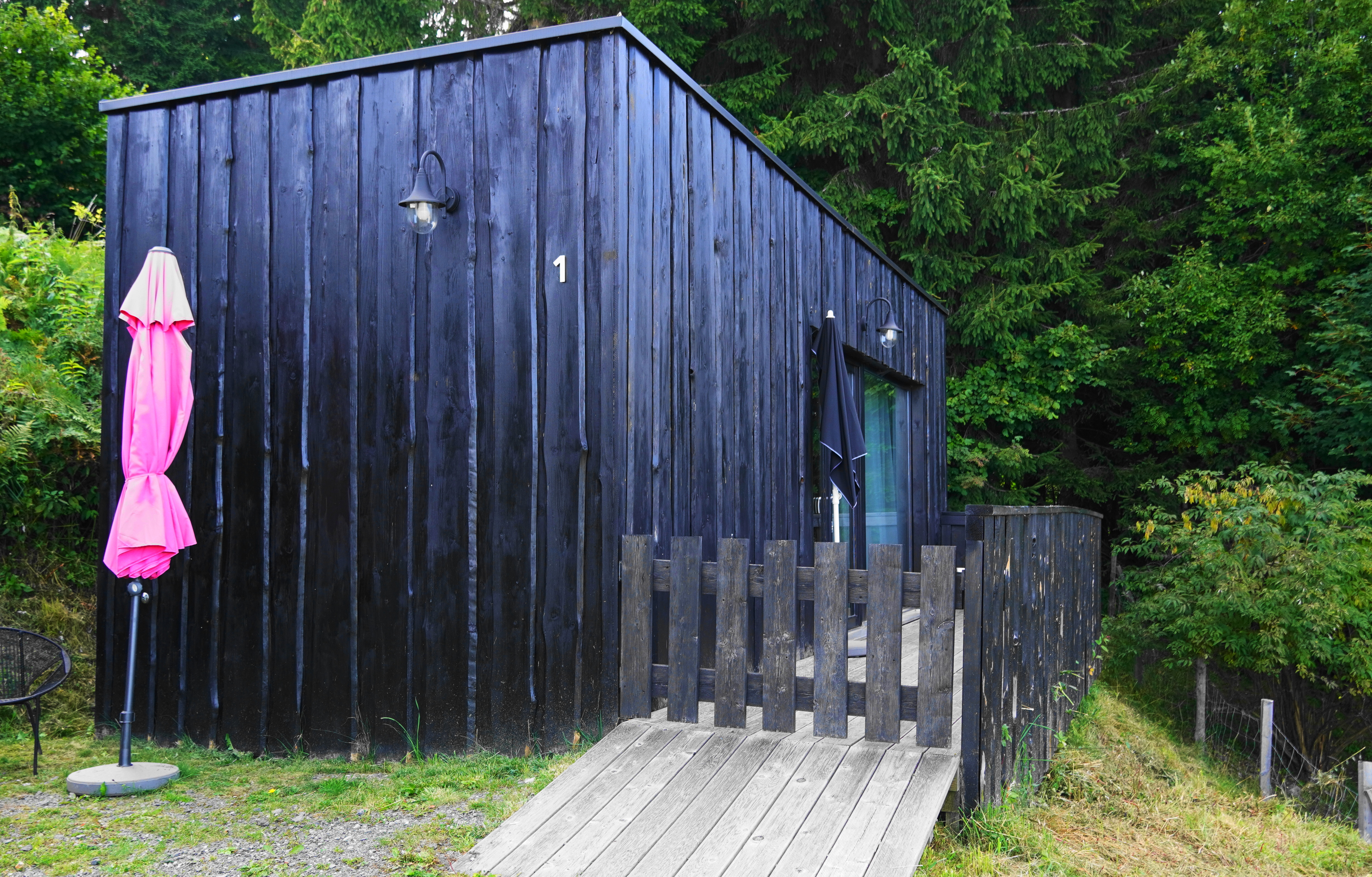
Tiny house in Austria

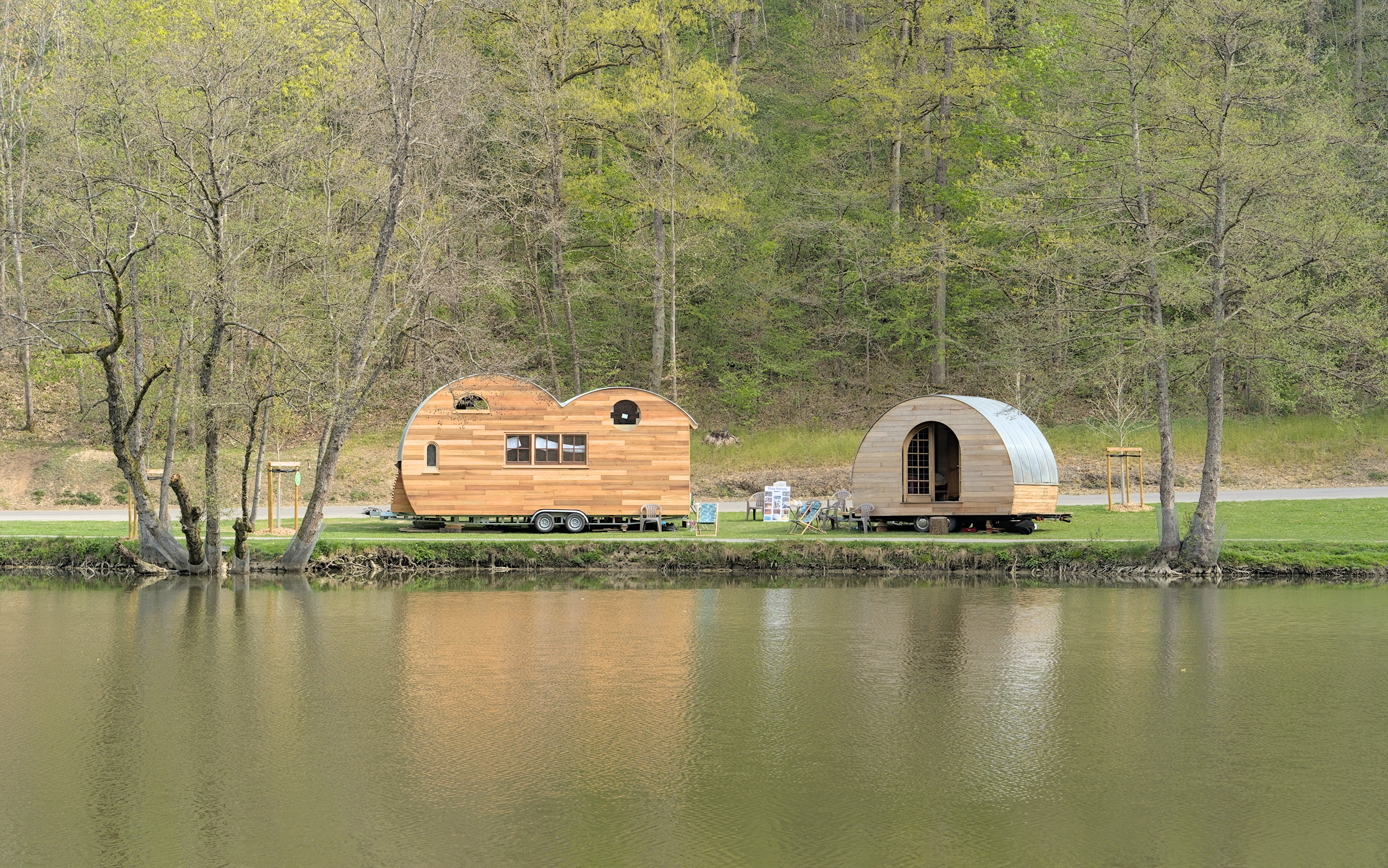
Tiny houses at an alternative housing festival in Belgium

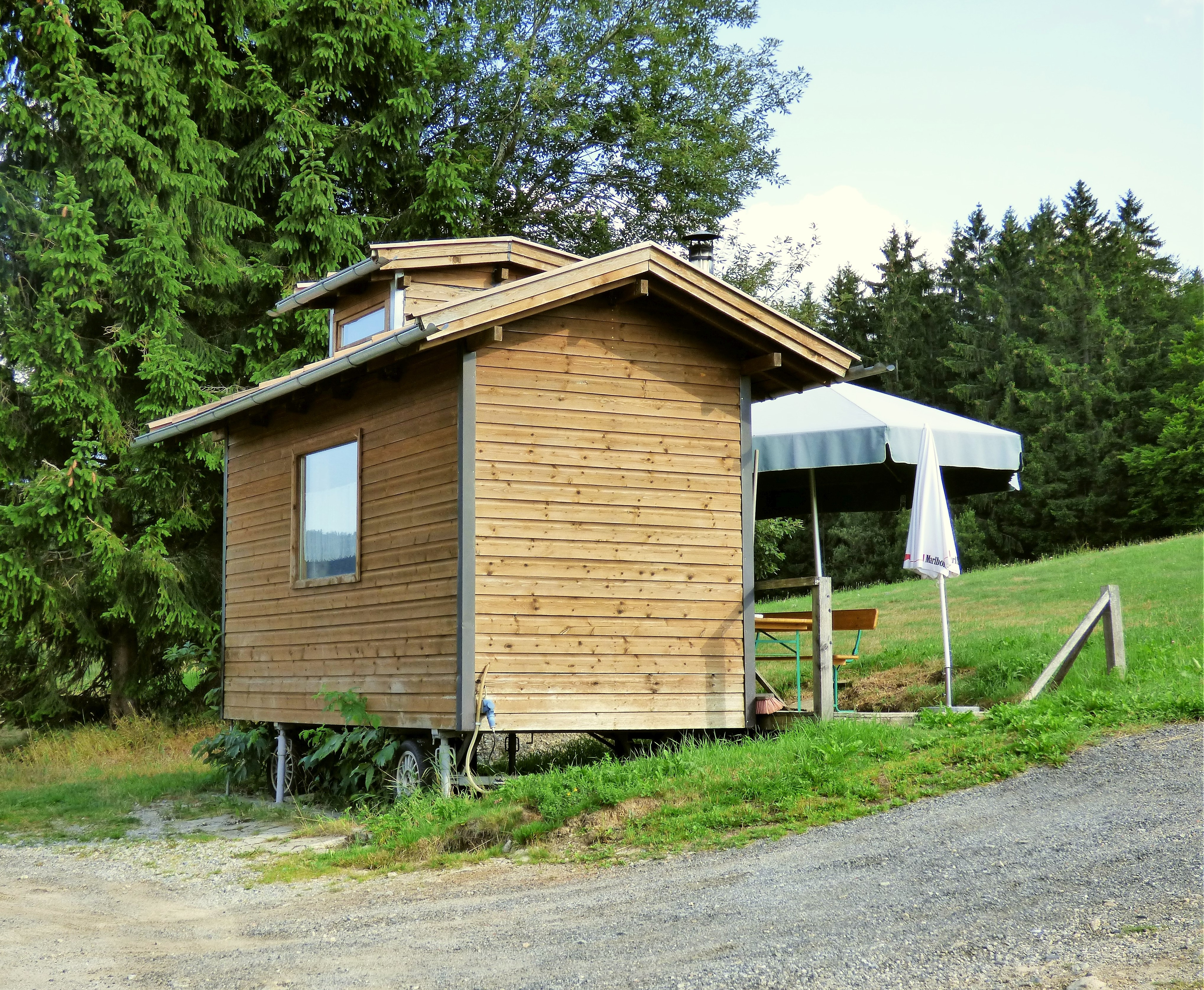
Tiny haus in Herzogsreut, German

While the movement is most active in the United States, interest in tiny homes has been observed in other countries as well:

- In Australia, designers such as Fred Schultz have created attention for the tiny-house movement. Designer Eco Tiny Homes, founded by Grant Emans, is Australia's largest tiny-home builder, creating roughly 100 tiny homes annually out of 2 factories in Ulladulla. Currently, many tiny home manufacturers design and build to meet the caravan regulations in efforts to avoid needing Council/Building approval. Although in practice, many of the buildings are not being weighed by the manufacturer and are indeed being sold over the 4.5 tonne weight limitation. In New South Wales, the legal status of tiny houses often falls under the Local Government (Manufactured Home Estates, Caravan Parks, Camping Grounds and Moveable Dwellings) Regulation 2021, which classifies them as "moveable dwellings." This regulatory framework has encouraged the development of modular "expandable" tiny houses, which are transported at a standard width but expand upon deployment to increase habitable floor space while maintaining their legal classification.
- In Canada, the legality of tiny homes depends on the location of the home and whether it is mobile or stationary. In Toronto, a tiny home requires a building permit and a connection to the power grid. In December 2019, Edmonton introduced by-laws permitting the construction of tiny homes on foundations, removing the former 5.5 m (18 ft) minimum width requirement. Some municipalities consider buildings that are not connected to the city electricity grid and sewerage systems in violation of building codes, possibly to avoid incidents similar to the leaky condo crisis in British Columbia, which resulted in an overhaul of the province's building codes. Similarly, some mobile tiny homes have been rejected from spaces designed for recreational vehicles (RVs) due to the tiny home failing to meet RV criteria. An "eco-village" of homes under 600 sq ft (56 m^{2}) in Okotoks known as the Homestead Project was proposed in 2017 but faced opposition from the Okotoks residents. Eventually, in August 2019, the council voted not to consider the project further after receiving a petition with 3,000 signatures opposed to the development.
- In France, the Ty Village, the first student tiny homes community in France, opened its doors 6 km (3.7 mi) away from University of Rennes Saint-Brieuc campus in Brittany, in September 2019.
- In Germany, the community of Vauban created 5,000 households on an old military base in Freiburg im Breisgau. The planned density of the building in that area was 50 dwelling units per acre. British architect Richard Horden, at the Technical University of Munich, developed the Micro Compact Home (M-CH), a high-end small (76 sq ft or 7.1 m^{2}) cube designed for 1–2 persons, with functional spaces for cooking, hygiene, dining/working, and sleeping.
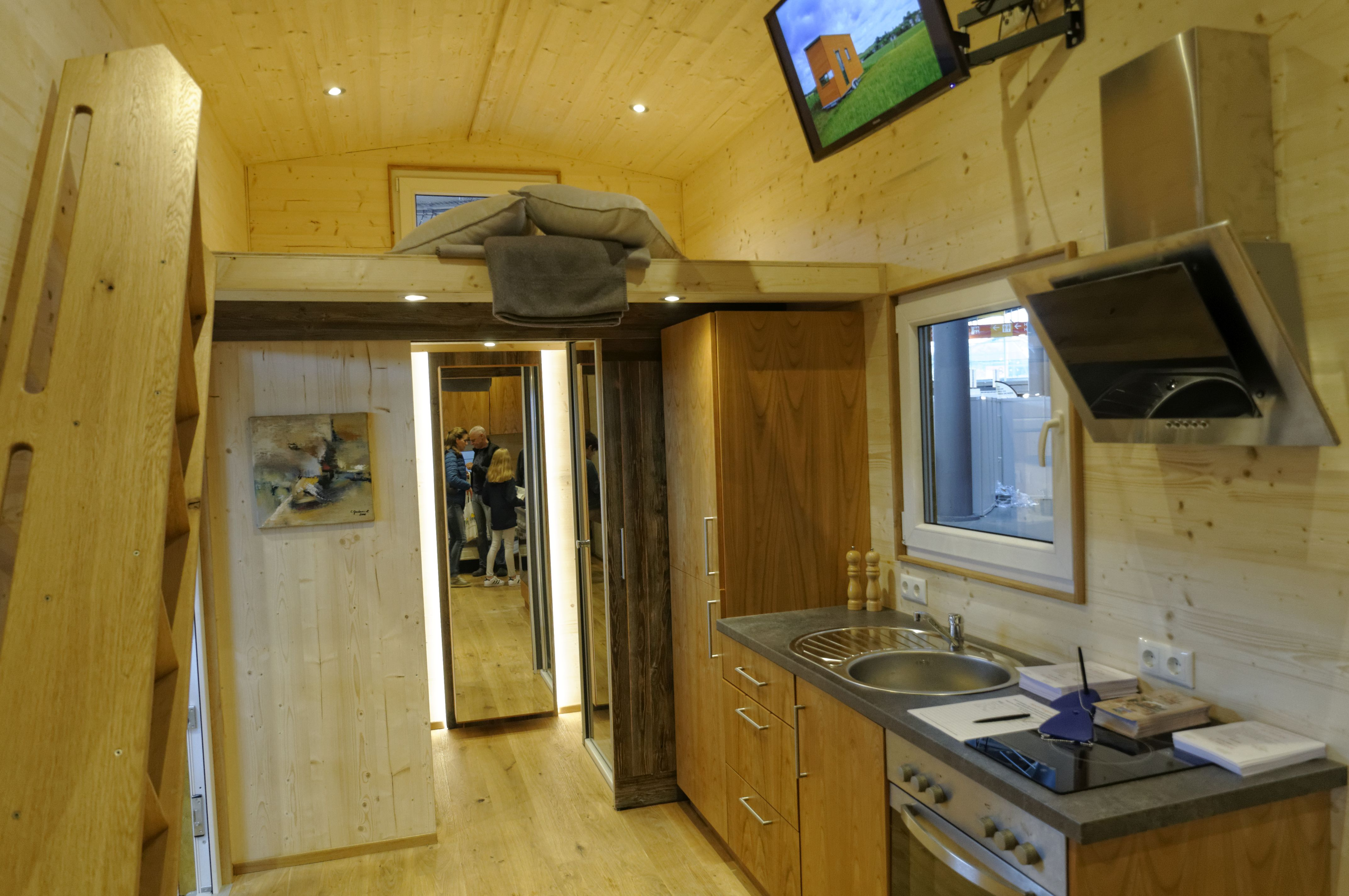
Interior of mobile tiny house on display Stuttgart 2019

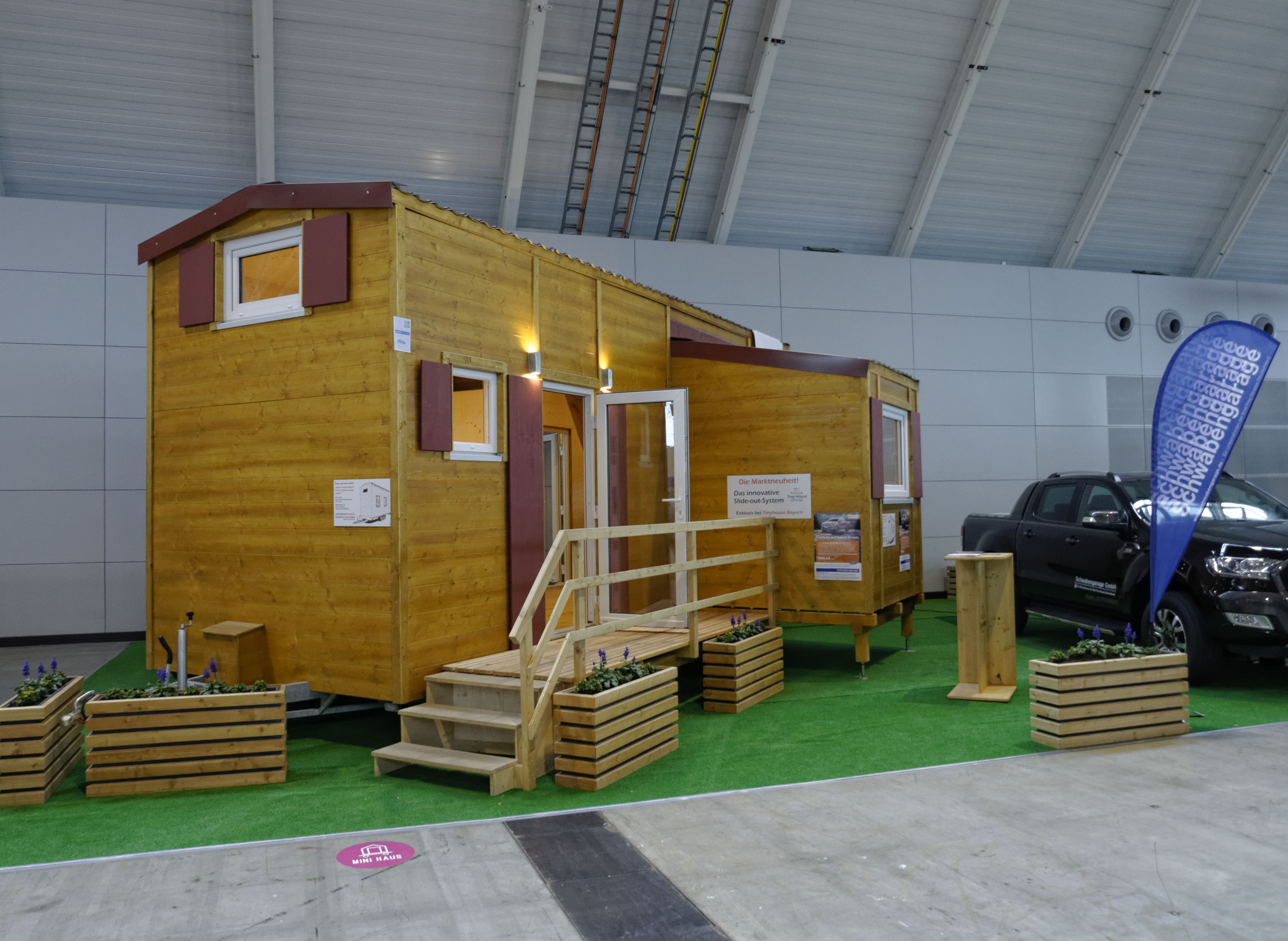
Exterior of the same

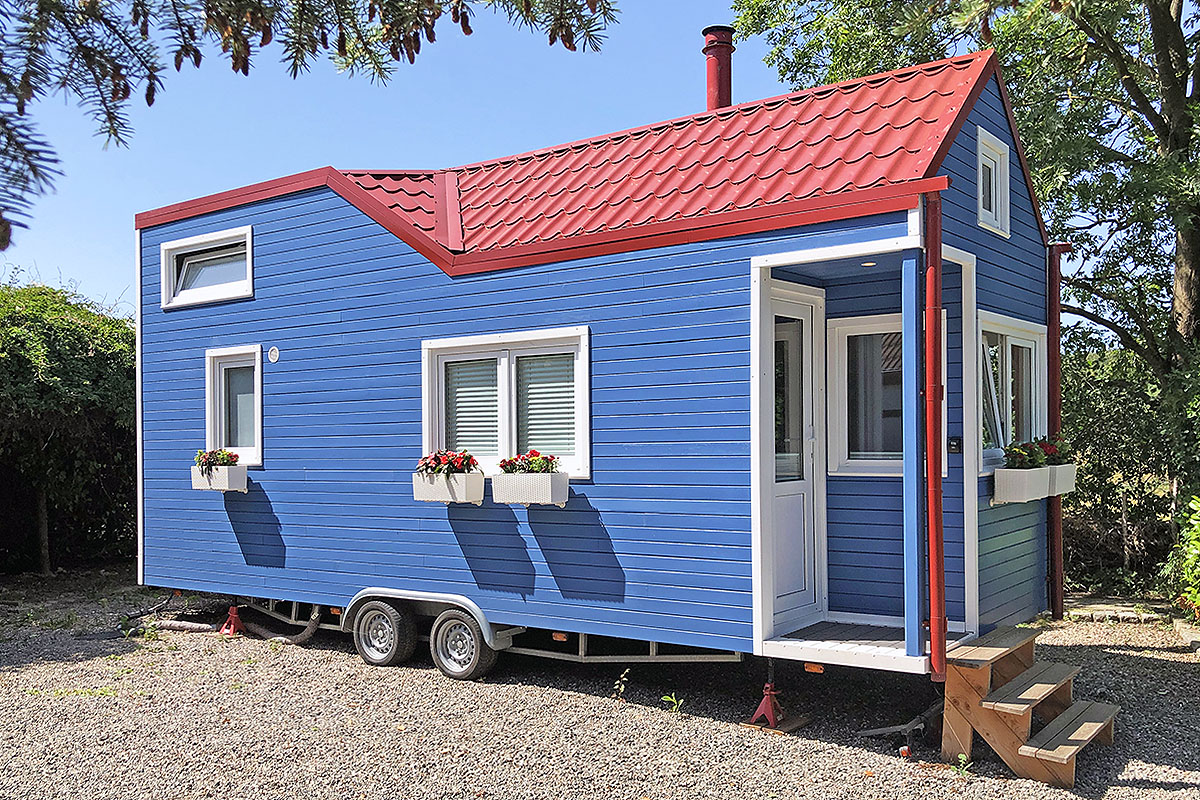
Rolling tiny house by PKW-Anhänger
- In New Zealand, company-built units are called mobile homes and tiny houses on wheels. As of 2021, it tends to be a grassroots initiative. Since 2013, New Zealand filmmaker Bryce Langston has hosted Living Big in a Tiny House, a short, documentary-style YouTube series on tiny homes around the world.
- In Spain, Eva Prats and Ricardo Flores created the 300 sq ft (28 m^{2}) House in a Suitcase.
- In the United Kingdom, tiny homes are developed by companies including Tiny Eco Homes UK and Abito. Tiny House Scotland has created the "NestHouse," a 23 m^{2} (250 sq ft) modular movable small eco-house to explore the possibilities of sustainable small-scale living in a highly insulated timber-framed structure with some passive house principles ensuring very low energy usage. Northern Ireland has also seen a small but growing community of tiny house owners, although the planning rules do not specifically accommodate tiny houses, with the result being that the planning process for a tiny house would need to be decided upon on a case-by-case basis.

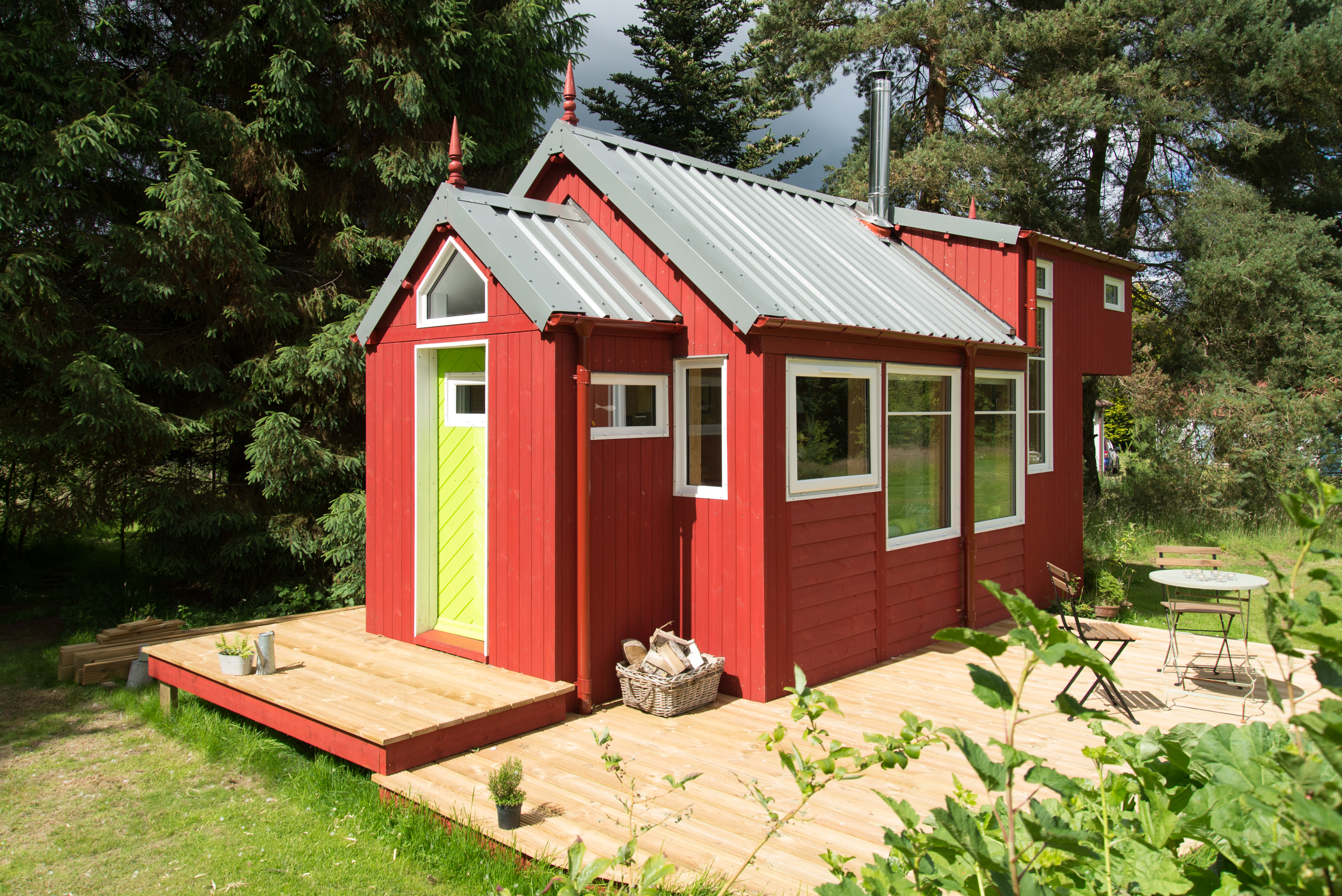
The NestHouse tiny house was designed and built by Jonathan Avery of Tiny House Scotland, Linlithgow UK.

- In Brazil, Tiny Houses Brazil was the first mini-house factory in the country, operating out of a shed on a farm property in Porangaba, São Paulo. The company develops projects and builds mini-houses on wheels.

== Legality ==
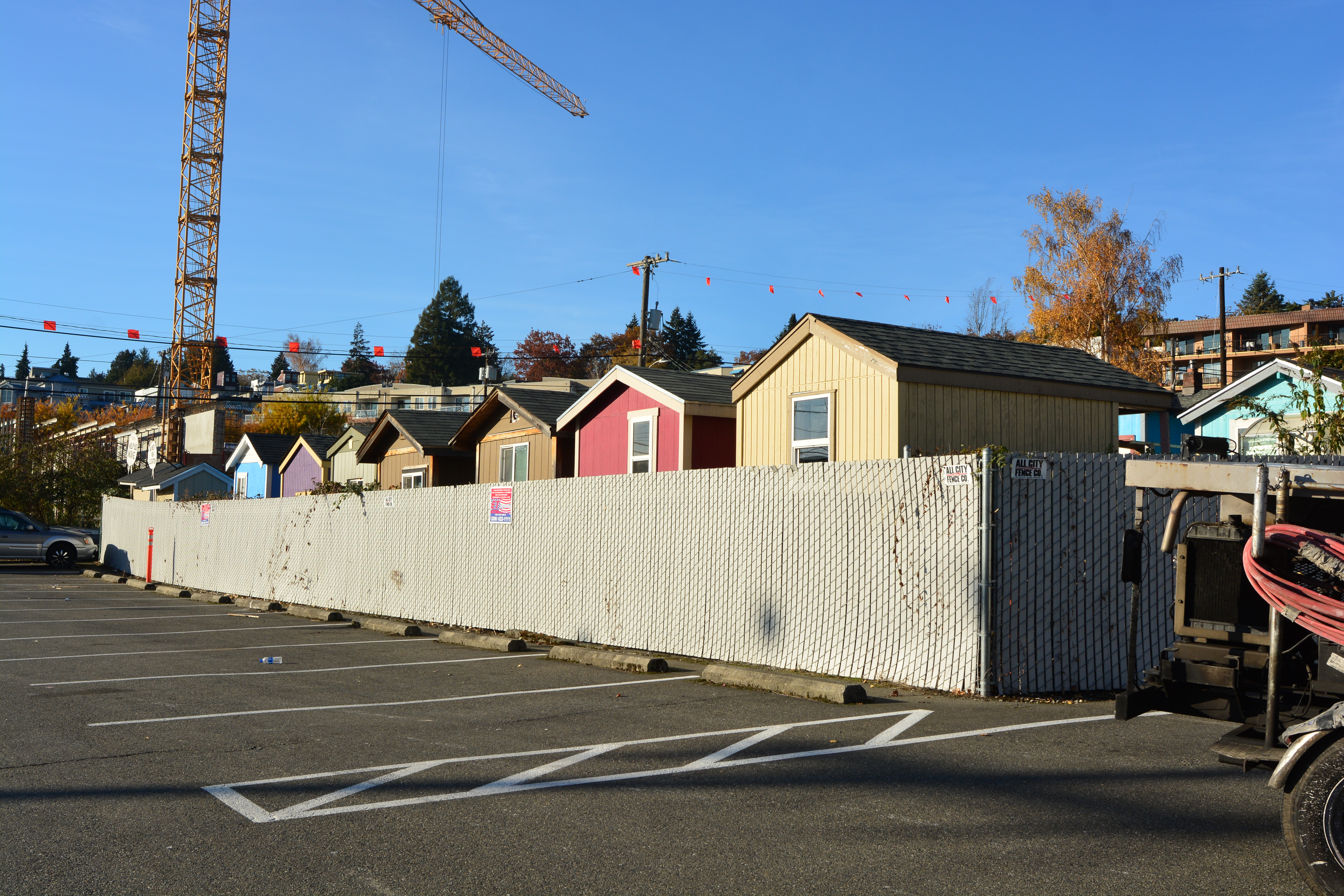
Tiny house village in Seattle, Washington, US

One of the biggest obstacles faced by the tiny-house movement is the difficulty of finding a region in which such a house can be constructed. Zoning regulations typically specify minimum square footage for new constructions on a foundation, and for tiny houses on wheels, parking on one's own land may be prohibited by local regulations against camping. While tiny houses have the potential to reduce building and living costs, they can still be costly as a result of the cost of the land they occupy.

In addition, RV parks do not always allow tiny houses unless they meet the criteria required for RVs. Tiny houses on wheels are considered RVs and are not suitable for permanent residence, according to the Recreational Vehicle Industry Association (RVIA). From RV Business, "The RVIA will continue to shy away from allowing members who produce products that are referred to as 'tiny houses' or 'tiny homes.' (However, the RVIA does allow 'tiny home' builders to join as long as their units are built to RV or park-model RV standards.)"

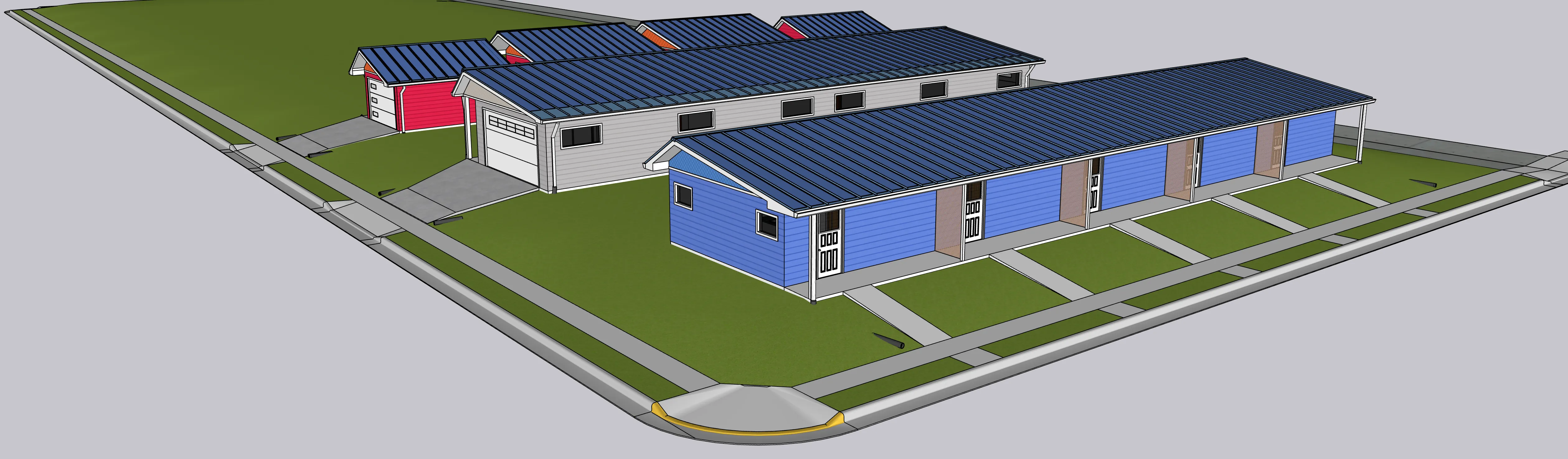
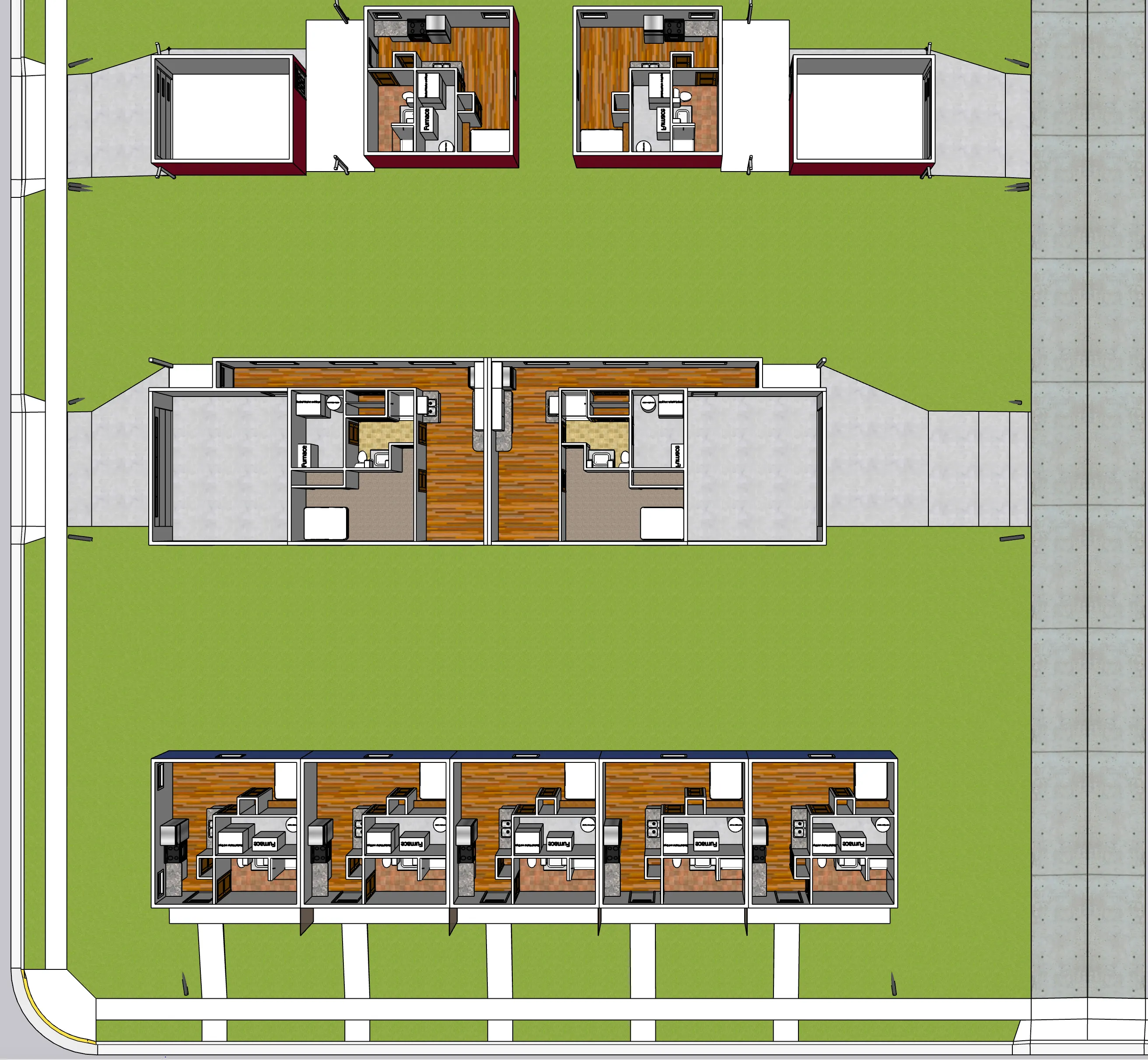
Concept for different ways of laying out a tiny home community

Some lower court decisions in the U.S. have struck down zoning laws related to size, which pose an obstacle to tiny housing. One such case was League of South Jersey, Inc. v. Township of Berlin, in which the court found that a zoning law related to the size of a home did not advance its stated goal of protecting citizens, causing the law to be repealed. This, and other similar decisions, have assisted in allowing for the propagation of the tiny-house movement despite their infrequency.

In 2014, the first "tiny-house friendly town" was declared in Spur, Texas; it was later clarified that a tiny house may not be on wheels, but rather must be secured to a foundation.

In July 2016, Washington County, Utah revised its zoning regulations to accommodate some types of tiny housing. Also in 2016, Fresno, California became the first US municipality to "write into its development code authorization for 'tiny homes,'" according to Mayor Ashley Swearengin.

Increasingly, tiny houses have become larger, heavier, and more expensive. This has signaled a move away from the initial movement goal of a reduced environmental impact as the popularity of tiny homes has taken off.

Tiny houses have been labeled as impractical spaces to raise families in. Overcrowding and lack of space have been noted to be detrimental to both physical and mental health, with the potential to affect academic performance in youth negatively.

In New Zealand, some district councils have sought to classify mobile homes and tiny homes on wheels as buildings, subject to the Building Act 2004. This was backed by the Ministry of Business, Innovation and Employment (MBIE) in a determination that was then challenged in District Court (Dall v MBIE). Judge Callaghan found in favor of Dall's argument that his home was not a building, ruling the council and MBIE to have erred in saying it was. Other cases have since been heard, but no further clarifications have been made by the New Zealand Government as of January 2021.

In the US, for a mobile tiny home to be legal on the road, it has to be less than 13.5 feet (4.1 m) tall, in order to pass under bridges.

== Housing for the homeless ==
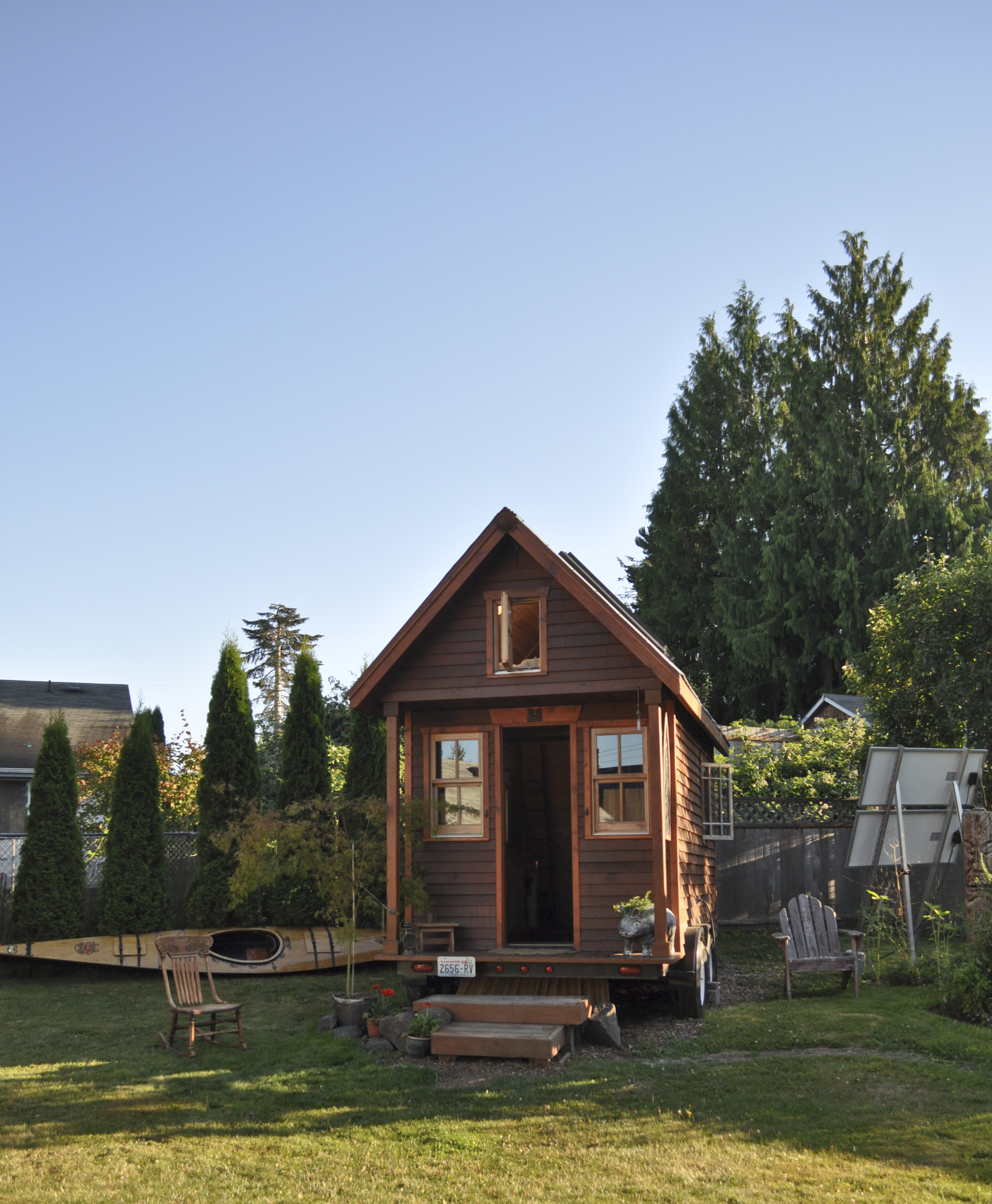
A tiny, mobile house in a Portland, Oregon, yard

The Great Recession (2007–2009) fueled the growth of the tiny-house movement. In several cities, an entrenched homeless population formed around tent cities, encampments that evolved to become semi-permanent housing. Homelessness in these communities was driven by foreclosures and expensive mortgages as a result of the United States housing bubble.

Tiny houses became an affordable option for individuals who lost their homes as a result of financial hardship. With their low cost and relatively easy construction, tiny houses have been adopted as shelters for the homeless in Eugene, Oregon; Olympia, Washington; Ithaca, New York; and other cities. Communities of tiny houses offer residents a transition towards self-sufficiency. Communities such as Othello Village in Seattle, Washington, originally lacked electricity and heat. In Seattle, non-profits have stepped in to help provide amenities.

Providing housing to the homeless reduces costs for municipalities. The long-term viability of tiny houses for homeless people is entirely dependent on the structure and sustainability of the model. Benefits of access to housing include privacy, storage, safety, restoration of dignity, and stability. For cities such as Chicago, tiny houses are seen as an appealing option to close the gap in housing availability.

In Reno, Nevada, faith-based groups and community advocates have legislated new zoning for housing of homeless people in a tiny home community called Camp Safe. The community, which opened in October 2023, has 50 8'x8' tiny house units, which the city calls ModPods. Each ModPod costs US$13,000 to build, compared with the $3,800 the county had initially estimated. The program has come out to $5.25 million. In 2020, Worcester, Massachusetts, announced plans for a village of 21 tiny homes for the chronically homeless. Due to complication from the COVID-19 pandemic, the city had to pivot to micro-units within a building rather than individual tiny homes. The city unveiled 24 long-term supportive housing units in October 2023, intending to open to tenants in December.

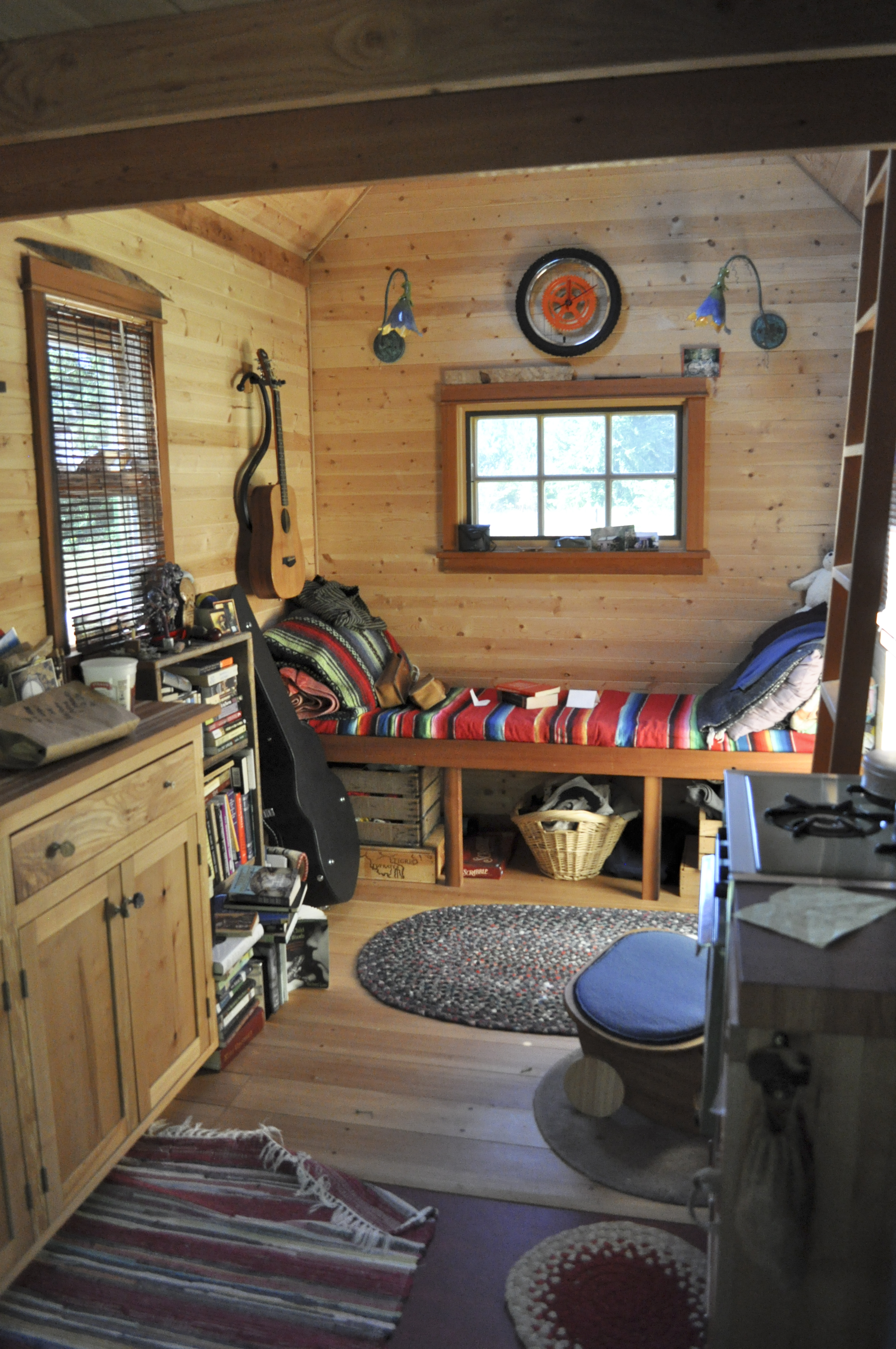
Interior of that tiny home in Portland

One challenge besides zoning and funding has been a NIMBY response by communities, which may weigh concerns over collections of tiny homes devolving into shantytowns or blighted neighborhoods which reduce the property values of the surrounding neighborhoods. Community planners have also voiced concerns in regards to the possibility of tiny house communities developing into shantytowns.

In California, the city of Richmond has engaged University of California, Berkeley students in the THIMBY (Tiny House In My Backyard) project with a pilot program aimed at developing a model of six transitional tiny homes to be placed in the city. THIMBY, with the support of Sustainable Housing at California, intends to foster an environment that allows homeowners and transitional housing residents to live as neighbors rather than in a landlord-tenant relationship. THIMBY acquires target locations for tiny housing development through surveying interested homeowners, offering to rent out backyard space for the tiny housing unit. While Sustainable Housing at California has independently scouted out interested individuals for the initial pilot project, the organization also aims to work closely with the City of Richmond's Tiny House on Wheels ordinance to bolster city-level efforts to provide affordable housing and shelter. This is in line with developing efforts in the San Francisco Bay Area to use micro-apartments and tiny houses in combating the housing crisis and homelessness in the San Francisco Bay Area. Similar efforts of using tiny houses to house the homeless are also ongoing in Oakland through a partnership between the City of Oakland and Laney College. In 2021, the California-based nonprofit organization Hope of the Valley funded and built 4 tiny home villages in Los Angeles, forming the first formal, legally uncontested tiny home project in the region. More informal efforts to build tiny homes for homeless communities had been made in the past by citizens in Los Angeles, but were ultimately seized by the city due to sanitation concerns.

As of 2022, tiny homes have been gaining popularity as a temporary solution for homelessness across the West coast, and in the Bay Area. Homeless individuals or families are commonly allowed to live in tiny homes for six months while seeking permanent housing, often with help from caseworkers; if they cannot, they are evicted, and then the tiny home is given to the next person or family on the waiting list. An analysis of data from several tiny home communities in Santa Clara and Alameda counties found that compared to dormitory-style homeless shelters, which led to permanent housing less than 15% of the time, tiny home communities led to permanent housing almost 50% of the time. Dormitory-style homeless shelters cost about $17,000 per bed per year; some tiny home communities like Oakland's Oak Street cost $22,500 per bed per year (with onsite portable toilets), with the inclusion of ensuite bathrooms as seen in certain San Jose shelters resulting in a cost increase to approximately $34,000 per bed per year. While the median studio apartment in San Jose rents for $29,000 per year as of 2022, tiny houses come equipped with support services to help homeless persons get jobs and permanent housing, resulting in higher overall costs.

In Edinburgh, Scotland, the Social Enterprise Social Bite asked Jonathan Avery of Tiny House Scotland to design a two bedroom variation of his "NestHouse" tiny house for its Homeless Tiny House Village in the Granton area of Edinburgh. The village was opened on May 17, 2018, by Angela Constance, the Scottish Cabinet Secretary for Communities, Social Security and Equalities, and features eleven "NestHouse" tiny houses and a community hub building all built by Carbon Dynamic.

In 2023, Tampa, Florida publicly funded the construction of 99 tiny houses that were 64 sq ft (5.9 m^{2}) each, with a fold-down bed and air conditioning to provide a place for the homeless to live, on a city lot. After one year, it was about 1/3 full, and a non-profit organization organized the homeless to live there to get them off the streets. There are also similar programs in Los Angeles. California is planning to invest $80 million to build 1200 tiny houses, though there are concerns that the tiny homes will not have a decent bathroom.

The number of tiny home villages went from 34 in 2019 to 123 by the summer of 2024, in an attempt to prevent homelessness. About 40% of the funding for these projects has come from philanthropic donations, and while the homes are usually less expensive, it can take time to work through bureaucratic and legal hurdles, in particular to have accountability that they are a humane living space. Designs vary, but some are thought to offer better living conditions than tents, or being on the street or woods.

=== Background on homelessness in the USA ===
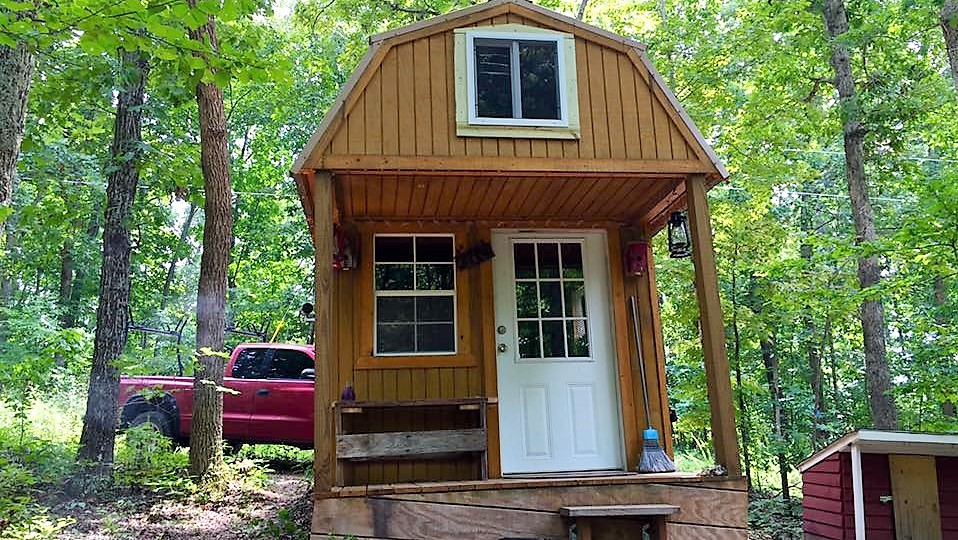
Shed converted to tiny home in Missouri, USA.

Homelessness is a critical issue in the United States. According to the U.S. Department of Housing and Urban Development, about 550,000 individuals were experiencing homelessness on a given night in 2018. By 2025, that number had risen by nearly 30% to more than 771,000. Categories of concern are those that are chronically homeless, those with mental health issues, and families with children who are going homeless, even temporarily. About 1/5 of the nation's homeless are in California, the largest population of any US state, but it's not uncommon in many big cities. In 2024, no community had enough permanent housing to meet the demand, according to the National Alliance to End Homelessness. Over half of those individuals were able to sleep in different types of shelters, while roughly 35 percent were unable to reside in a sheltered area. People who experience homelessness die 30 years earlier than the average American. According to the Environmental Council of Sacramento, homelessness is also a contributor to environmental deterioration. For example, waste can accumulate around outdoor living spaces, which tend to be near waterways, sewage systems, or parks, which can lead to the contamination of the surrounding ecosystem.

Some advocates have suggested combating chronic homelessness through the establishment of tiny house communities. The nonprofit organizations behind such establishments aim to help individuals solve their housing problems and offer a space where individuals can connect with others who find themselves in similar circumstances. Their goal is not only to give homeless people a place to live, but also offer them a variety of resources. Building communities of tiny homes for the homeless is a group effort involving homeless people, cities themselves, and housing advocates.

== Housing for disaster relief ==
Tiny homes are also utilized for disaster relief housing, and one such design was developed in the late 2010s in Florida. It was intended for disaster relief housing and was designed to handle hurricane-force winds. There are several non-profit organizations that specialize in using tiny homes to provide housing in disaster areas. For example, after Hurricane Helene destroyed the Del Rio, Tennessee, home of an 84-year-old cancer patient in 2024, a tiny house company provided him a free 8x20 foot home.

== Reactions ==
In 2019, researchers published the results of the Tiny House Community Survey, finding that "decreased cost, a simplified lifestyle and increased freedom" were leading motivators for tiny house residents.

Smaller homes are less expensive than larger ones in terms of taxes and building, heating, maintenance, and repair costs. The lower cost of living may be advantageous to those with little savings, such as people aged 55 and older. In addition to costing less, small houses may encourage a less cluttered, simpler lifestyle, and reduce ecological impacts for their residents. The typical size of a small home seldom exceeds 500 square feet (46 m^{2}). The typical tiny house on wheels is usually less than 8 by 20 ft (2.4 by 6.1 m), with livable space totaling 120 sq ft (11 m^{2}) or less, for ease of towing and to exempt it from the need for a building permit.

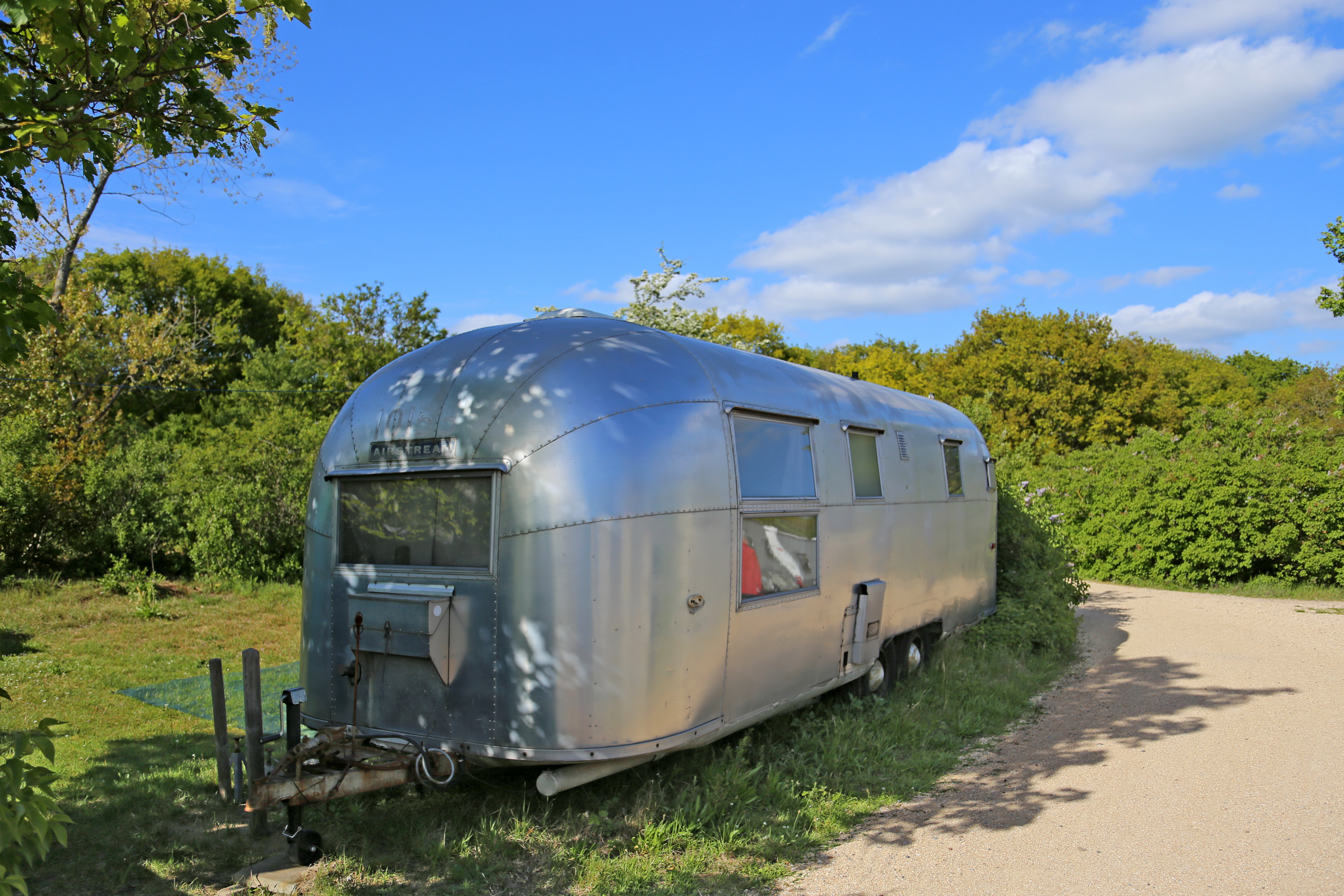
Trailer home - in some cases, ''tiny homes'' fall under laws used for mobile homes and recreational vehicles.

Small houses may emphasize design over size, utilize dual-purpose features and multi-functional furniture, and incorporate technological advances of space-saving equipment and appliances. Vertical space optimization is also a common feature of small houses and apartments. An example of this is the use of loft spaces for sleeping and storage. Because of overall height restrictions related to the ability to easily tow a tiny house, it is common for lofts to be between 3.3 ft and 5.5 ft (1.0m and 1.7m) in height. Therefore, for accessibility of elderly and disabled people, larger floor plans that keep essential elements like a bed, bathroom, and kitchen on the main floor are more typical.

The increased use of small houses as second homes or retirement houses may lead to the development of more land. People interested in building a small home can encounter institutional "discrimination" when building codes require minimum size well above the size of a small home. Also, neighbors may be hostile because they fear negative impacts on their property values and have concerns about increased taxes.

In building tiny houses, there is often a misalignment between the needs of the occupant(s) and the expressed design from the creating team. This reality is used as a call for architects and design teams to work with psychologists to build tiny homes that are better suited to the needs of the occupant(s). In understanding these considerations, not everyone is suited for a tiny house.

More broadly, these sentiments of "othering" homeless and unhoused persons have culminated in a broader movement of NIMBY-ism, or "Not in My Backyard."

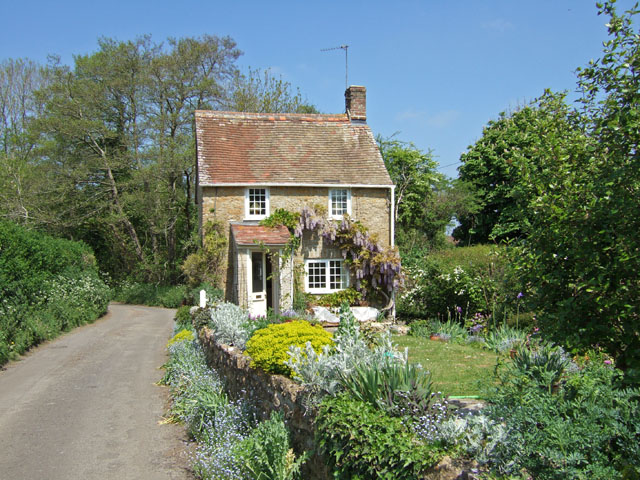
In other cases, tiny homes fall under rules for houses, like this small cottage.

The advent of NIMBY-ism occupied much of community organizing and housing advocacy dialogue in the 1980s, so much that some coined it "the populist political philosophy of the 1980s." In many ways, NIMBY philosophy functions through the "spatialization of stigma," allowing residents and homeowners to reallocate and redefine neighborhoods and local communities and, consequently, which individuals should be allowed to occupy such an area. While modern U.S. society has statistically experienced a growing need for human services and welfare, researchers have acknowledged that "the stigmatization of persons and places are thus mutually constitutive of community rejection and organized resistance to human service facility sitting." In effect, community resistance to housing advocacy and affordability measures further exacerbates the dwindling number of public resources and social services available to vulnerable and displaced homeless persons.

Concerns over the efficacy of tiny homes for homeless people persist. Some critics have argued that, similar to other forms of anti-homelessness legislation, tiny home villages are fundamentally carceral, designed to push their tenants into less public spaces near city outskirts to marginalize homeless people rather than provide long-term stability. These villages, the critics argue, effectively exempt homeowners from community obligations towards the well-being and sheltering of community members experiencing homelessness: "Tiny sheds and other forms of carceral housing are part of a system of interdependent measures intended to banish unhoused people from the public eye and to invisibilize the poverty produced by high rents and low wages."

Despite the framing of housing as a fundamental rights-based issue, community perspectives have evolved towards a more economic, individualized form that correlates a person's home-ownership and housing to their values and ethics, employability, and general ability to provide for themselves and their families. As such, the inability of both the private and public sectors to supplement the widening gap of affordable housing options and shelter is, in some ways, conveniently explained by an individual's supposed inability to ensure living stability, maintain financial independence, and solidify their position within society at large.

== Design ==
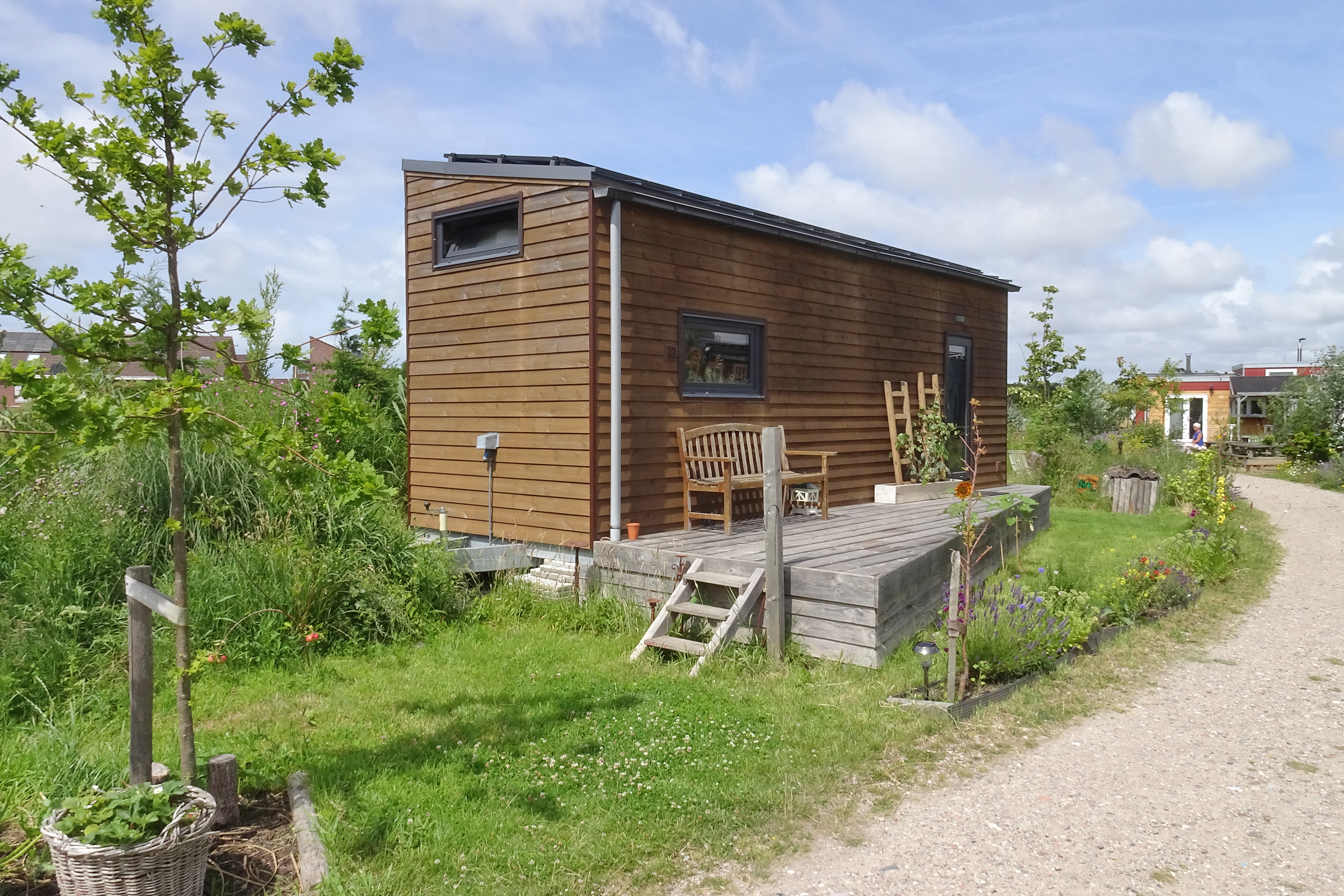
Tiny house in the Netherlands

Tiny homes threaten increased grid defection because of their inherently low energy demands as a result of their small size. Their customized builds and smaller energy demand often result in the ability to sustain a tiny house entirely on rooftop photovoltaics such as roof-mounted solar panels. This has become especially prominent due to the continuously decreasing price of solar panels and batteries, and tiny homes have become notable as an example of an existing and commercially available alternative off-grid option for housing.

One of the issues with designing a tiny house is when to know when a home is too small to live in humanely. On the other side, there is some dispute when a house becomes too big to be a tiny home, with an upper limit of 400 square feet (37 m^{2}). Though some disagree, and choosing 500 sq ft (46 m^{2}), and even 600 sq ft (56 m^{2}) to define a tiny home.

Many tiny houses range from 100 sq ft (9.3 m^{2}) to 400 sq ft (37 m^{2}), though houses up to 1,000 sq ft (93 m^{2}) might be thought of as tiny houses. However, at 1,000 sq ft the house may also be considered a small, not tiny, house.

There is not a single standard to decide what is part of the area of a tiny home or not, though in general, a loft with limited floor area is not included. There are rules in the International Building Code for determining habitable space, such as the minimum ceiling height and rules about lofts. However, because there is not one standard, it can be hard to compare tiny houses if not aware of what is being included.

=== Off-grid solar electrical system ===
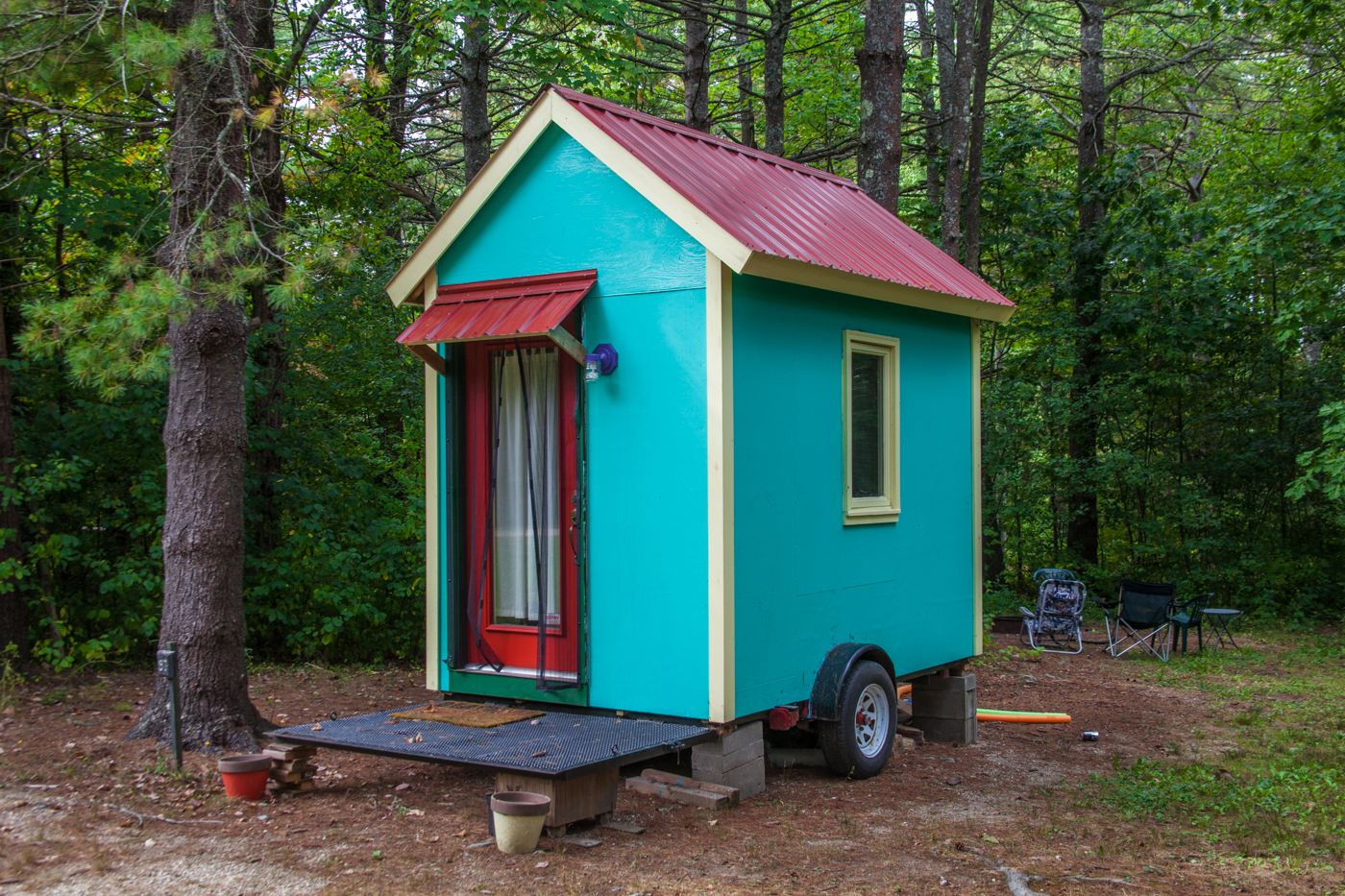
Mobile tiny house at a Maine campsite

Each space and house will have its own energy consumption profile and generation demand. Consequently, they must size their power equipment accordingly. The needed size of battery systems to store captured energy or grid-supplied energy that will be used during times without power production from the rooftop solar, such as when there is inadequate insolation, depends on the generation capacity (as to not under or oversize the battery bank), the type of batteries used, their individual capacity (A⋅h), the discharge rate allowable per cycle (%), the size of loads (W), how long they will be run, and how many days of storage are needed. Battery sizing calculators are available online to simplify this process. Additionally, battery balancers, sensors that can read and recalibrate the available capacity, or state of charge, between different battery cells, can be added to extend the life of a battery system to prohibit voltage offset or non-ideal current flow, potentially damaging or capacity reducing to batteries over time. Batteries are rated in terms of ampere-hours with their discharge rate and capacity set by the manufacturer at a specific current and total amount of time, as voltage differs with temperature and power will vary with the rate of discharge.

To fully convert a tiny home for living capacities off-grid, other power electronic power equipment is necessary, such as a charge controller, an inverter to power AC loads or down-regulators for DC loads, and proper protection devices such as circuit breakers and fuses. Specific sine inverters may offer simultaneous grid power hookup, called grid-tie inverters, in case of insufficient energy generation locally. Grid-tie inverters are of academic interest and are being studied by utilities for their impacts and potential benefits to voltage regulation, infrastructure implications, protection schema requirements, economics, and optimum policy regarding integration for implementation into the electrical grid with the rise of distributed generation, namely, residentially supplied solar power.

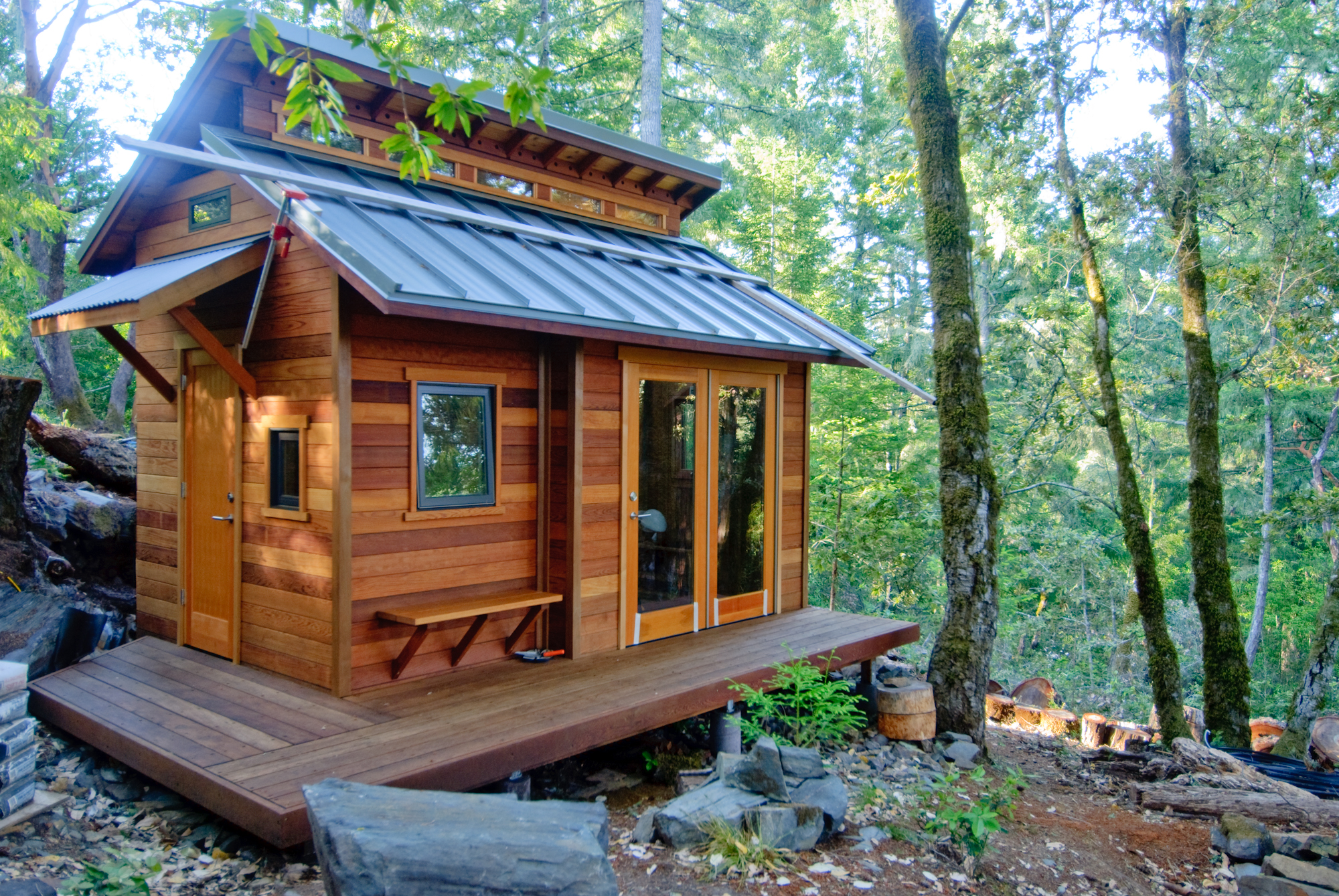
Cabin-inspired tiny home built in the woods

=== Size of homes ===
Tiny homes typically range between 100 and 300 square feet (9.3 and 27.9 m^{2}). Considering the small size of tiny homes in comparison to that of average-sized homes, energy costs are consistently smaller; moreover, tiny home power grids are typically sourced from solar panels, which decreases the amount of publicly produced energy necessary to sustain the home. More importantly, the price difference of using solar power on a tiny home in comparison to an average-sized home significantly decreases the homeowner's expenses, resulting in a significant difference between the energy emissions and cost necessary for output between a tiny home and average-sized home. While a tiny home is sustained to operate on 914 kilowatt hours a year, producing on average 1,144 pounds (0.519 t) of carbon dioxide, an average-sized house requires 12,733 kilowatt hours, which releases close to 16,000 pounds (7.3 t).

Consequently, tiny homes require the consumption of less energy to support the homeowner. As a result, people living in tiny homes typically limit their engagement with materialism. The limited space of a tiny home encourages owners to make sacrifices in regards to the accumulation of materialistic items. It further allows homeowners to re-evaluate their personal habits, which subsequently translates into awareness regarding environmental sourcing. The concept of a "tiny" home reflects all aspects of the chosen lifestyle; a minimized space necessitates minimal consumer spending while the limited amount of surface area provided decreases the rate and level of energy consumption.

=== Environmentally conscious design ===
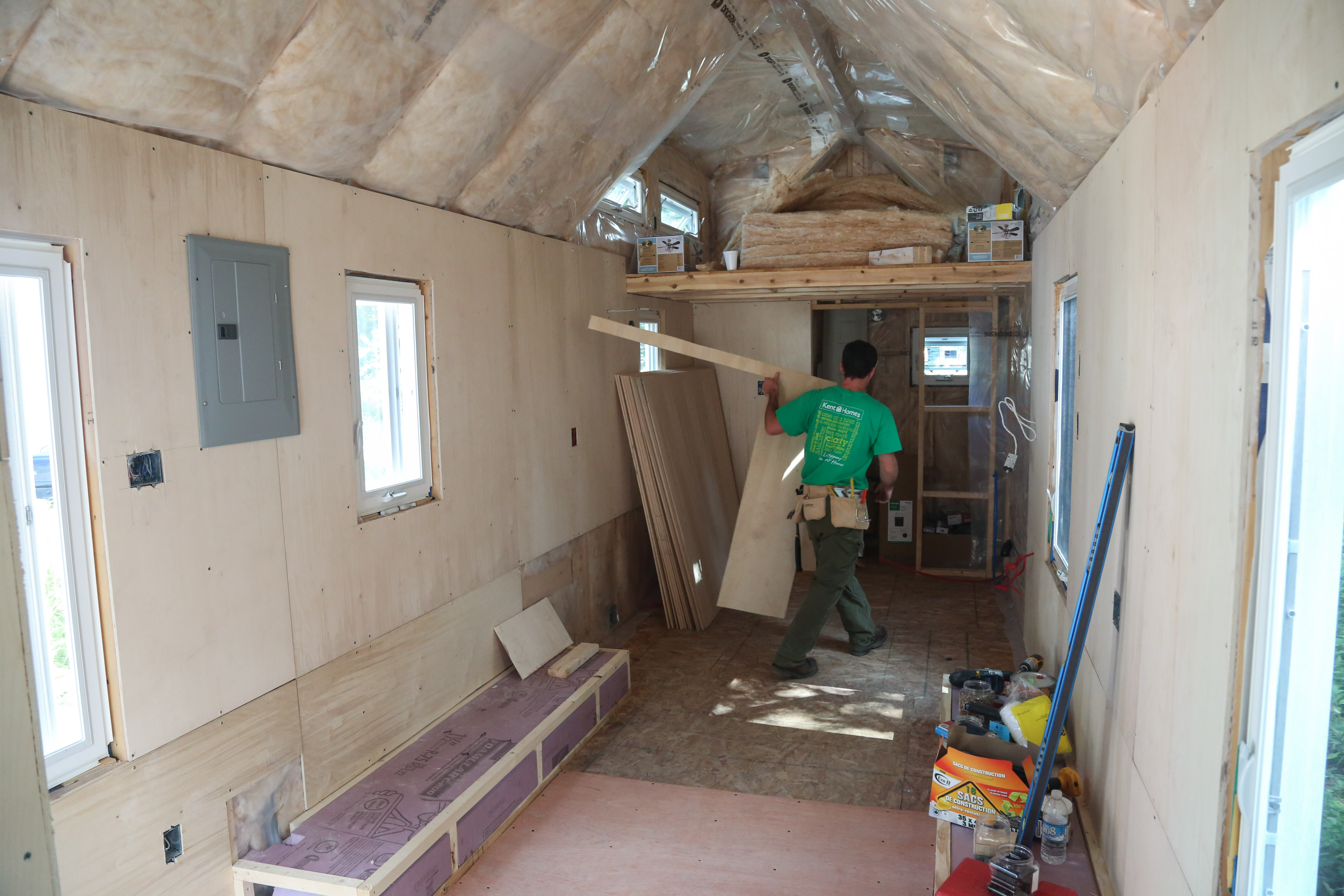
Interior construction of a tiny house

Human beings have been the main contributors in recent environmental changes. One critical proponent of these changes relates to infrastructure; buildings affect both human beings and the environment. However, the costs tend to affect the environment while the benefits are exclusive to humans. The intention of building new infrastructure is to guarantee its sustainability for a long period. As a result, the less environmentally intentional a facility is, the more it will depend on consumption of natural resources. "Part of the very definition of a tiny home is that it be constructed with environmentally conscious and renewable materials." Most tiny homes are designed to receive their services in ways that are less environmentally exhausting. Electrical grids and public utilities have distinguishable ways that tiny homes receive various water, electric, and plumbing services. This detail is critical for consideration when individuals move from average-sized homes to tiny homes because it allows individuals to save money while using fewer environmental resources. Another important environmentally conscious feature relates to toilets. Some tiny homes are equipped with incinerator toilets, which get rid of waste by burning it rather than flushing. By eliminating toilet flushing, the amount of water used in a household significantly decreases. An alternative feature is a compost toilet which works by decomposing the waste using evaporation to remove it. Therefore, not only are tiny homes energy efficient, the makeup of these homes is also intended to be environmentally friendly. Subsequently, for new materials to be both utilized in construction and sustainable for long periods, the production of such materials is dependent on various chemicals; this added step removes additional resources from the environment. An alternative to this is the usage of recycled materials. The tiny homes designed by a group in Texas consciously avoid using new materials in their construction. Because 30–40% of energy consumption is expended by human beings, it has been argued that infrastructure is best fit to include the consumption of humans within its blueprints.

Individuals who live in tiny homes are directly connected to the environment primarily because of the proximity between tiny homes and the surrounding ecosystems. Through constant contact, the homeowner is allowed to better understand the functions of nature. Such an understanding allows for an increase in environmental awareness.

== Superlative tiny houses ==
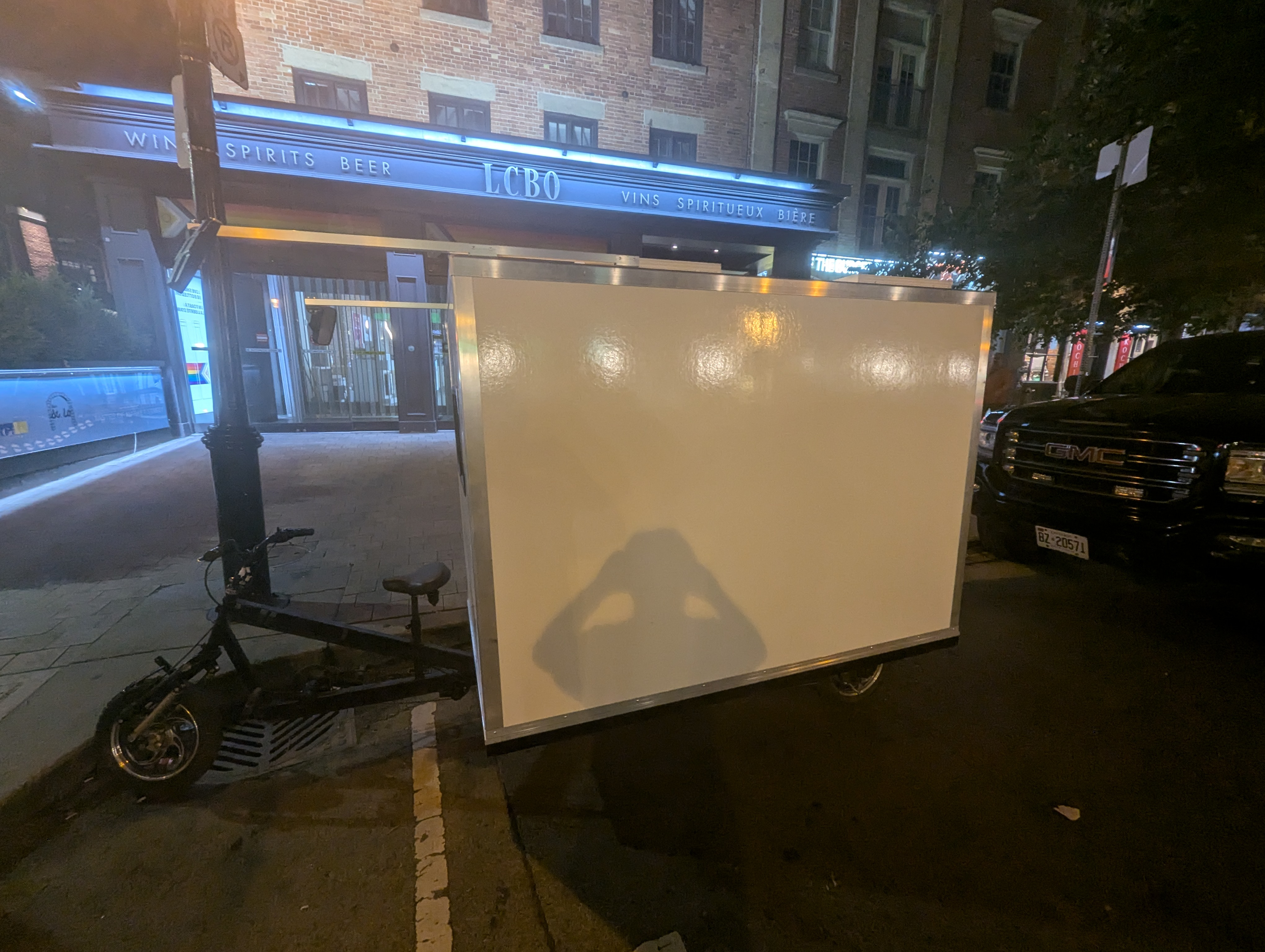
Tiny house tricycle in Canada

There are various informal records for tiny houses, and articles discussing the tiniest tiny houses are popular. One of the tiniest recognized tiny houses, was created by Boston artist Jeff Smith, who built a house with just 25 sq ft (2.3 m^{2}) for a mockumentary in 2016. Despite the size, the mobile dwelling had many functional if limited features, including bed, bathing, stove, windows, waste management, and was listed on AirBnB (a room rental company) in the late 2010s. In 2024, a YouTuber built a 24 sq ft (2.2 m^{2}) house in an attempt to build the smallest house, the final design had slightly less area at 22.7 square feet (2.11 m^{2}); they hoped to get Guinness book of records category but there was no such category. That same year, Levi Kelly, a YouTuber built a "tiniest tiny home", a portable home with 19.4 sq ft (1.80 m^{2}). It included a sink, a/c, seating area, bed, and outdoor toilet and shower. A mobile composting toilet could be used outside or taken in for privacy. As with previous examples, it was built for the express purpose of breaking a record, though they did intend to use it as camper (caravan).

The smallest recognized standard tiny small house size is about 160 sq ft (15 m^{2}), or 8x20, which, though on the smaller side of a small house might include a tiny kitchen area, bathroom, and sleeping area combined in one space with minimal features. One of the problems with houses this size is having running water and electricity, though they can be more mobile than larger sizes.

One of the smallest houses lived in is 50 sq ft (4.6 m^{2}), but 60 sq ft (5.6 m^{2}) may be the minimum threshold for a "normal" tiny house. In comparison, some of the smallest apartments in cities, for example, there is a 60 sq ft former broom closet in London, and in New York City, a 90 sq ft (8.4 m^{2}) space near Central Park included a bathroom. However, some lofts and studio apartments start to deviate from the concept of a home, such as having a shared bathroom. In Hong Kong, small 4 sq ft (0.37 m^{2}) sleeping areas can be rented for example, and in Tokyo the idea of capsule hotels.

In 2023, a review of the tiniest tiny homes selected models that ranged from 143 to 270 sq ft (13.3 to 25.1 m^{2}) per person in range of designs, ranging from floating cabin (323 sq ft, 30.0 m^{2}) to house-like mobile home at 200 sq ft (19 m^{2}) per person but would house parents, grandparents, and kids in one dwelling.

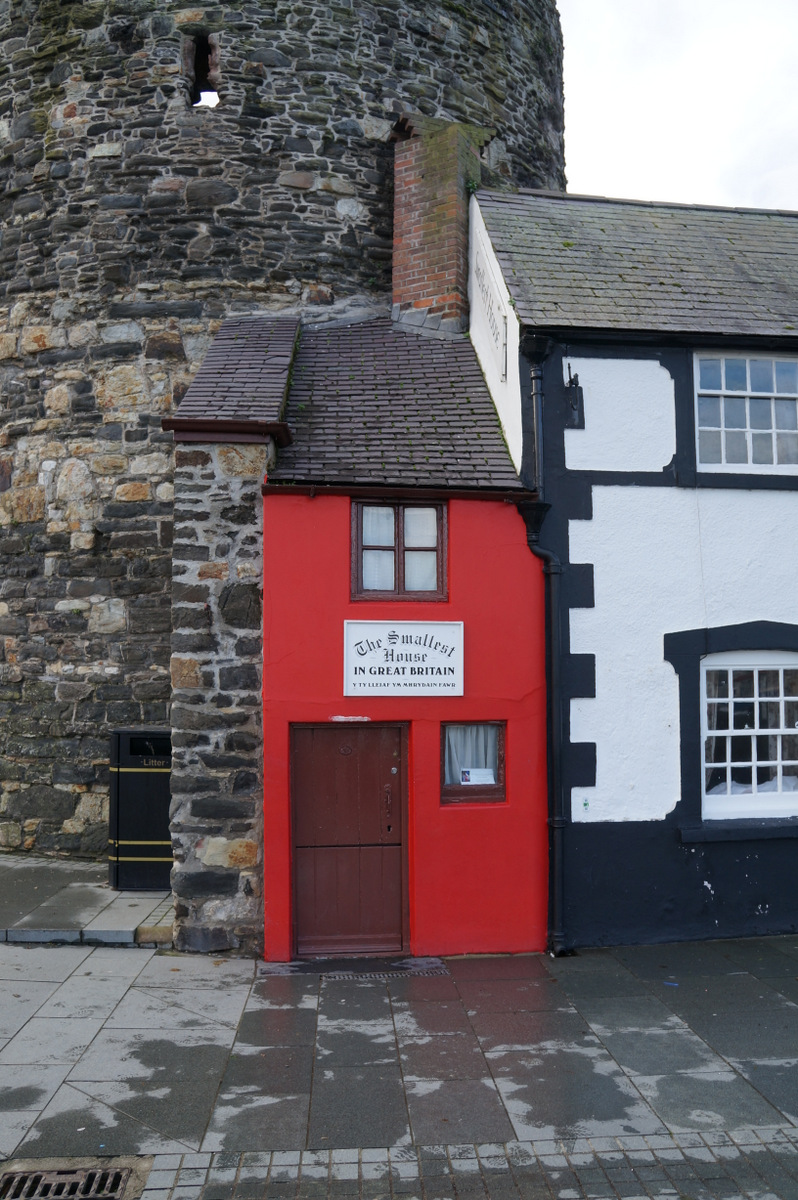
While predating the modern tiny house movement, this is the smallest recognized house in the U.K., however it has become a tourist attraction after it was ruled uninhabitable.

One of the most recognized smallest houses is the Smallest House in Great Britain; however, the owner had to leave when authorities ruled it was not fit for habitation. In Romania, the MuMa Hut by WeWilder is recognized as tiny home and is 15 m^{2}, designed chiefly by architect Miodrag Stoianov and set in orchard.

== See also ==
- Affordable housing
- Alternative housing
- Beach hut
- Caravan (trailer)
- Construction trailer
- Cottage
- Earthship
- FIRE movement
- Friggebod
- Fulltiming
- Homestead principle
- Housetrucker
- Laneway house
- Log cabin
- Mobile home
- Modular building
- Optibo
- Perpetual traveler
- Recreational vehicles
- Shanty town
- Shepherd's hut
- Shipping container architecture
- Shotgun house
- Simple living
- Summer house
- Tent city
- Triple-decker triplex
- Van-dwelling
- Vardo (Romani wagon)
- Yurt
