= Poppleton, Baltimore =

Neighborhood in Baltimore

Poppleton
- Neighborhood of Baltimore
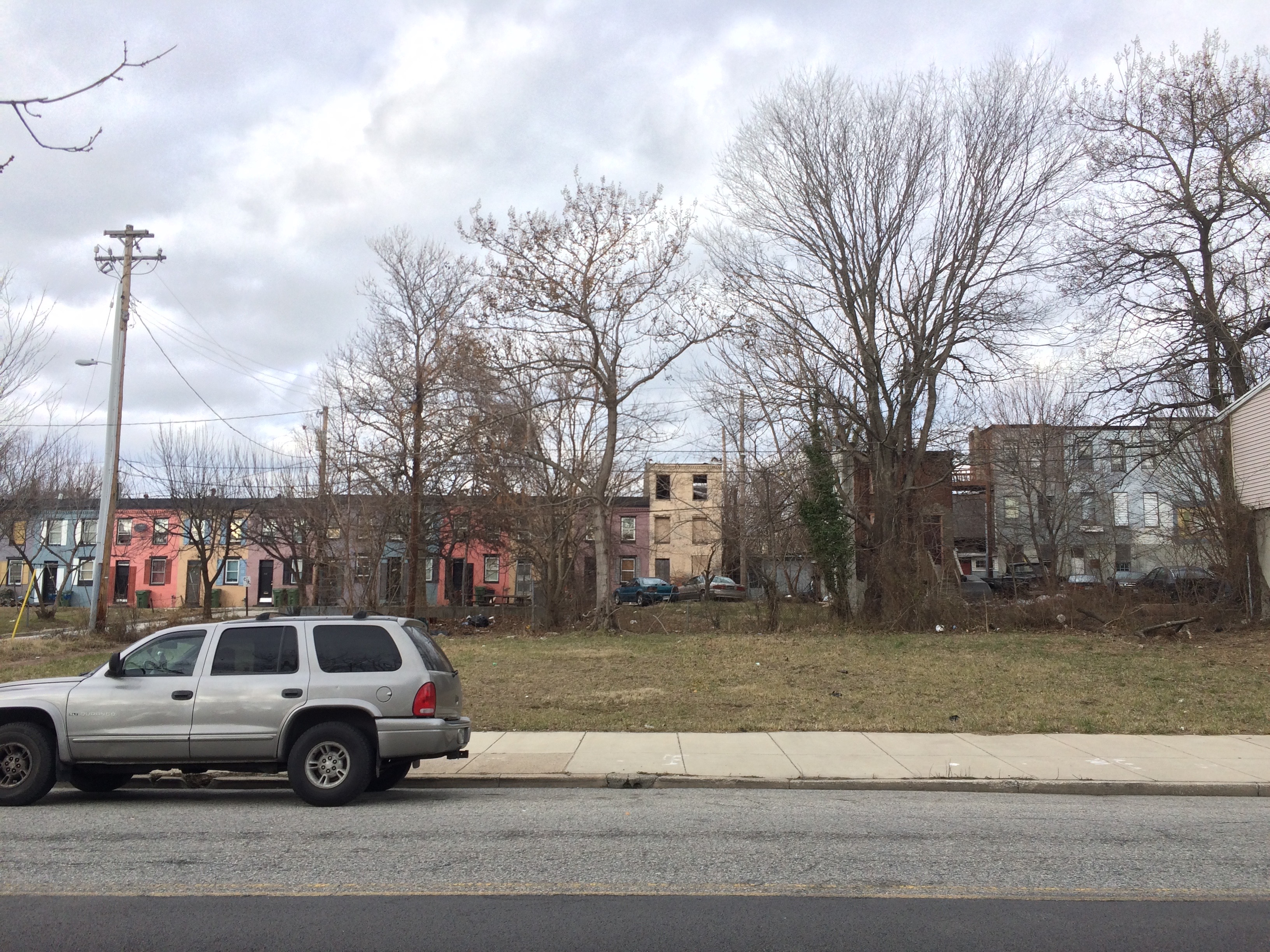
- 1100 block of Saratoga Street, with row of alley houses on 1100 block of Sarah Ann Street visible behind, in Poppleton, Baltimore

- Location within Baltimore Location within Maryland Location within the United States
- Coordinates: 39°17′28″N 76°38′00″W
- Country: United States
- State: Maryland
- City: Baltimore
- Time zone: UTC−5 (Eastern)
  - Summer (DST): UTC−4 (EDT)
- ZIP Codes: 21223, 21201
- Area Codes: 410, 443, 667

Poppleton is a neighborhood in west Baltimore, Maryland. The neighborhood is bounded on the north by West Mulberry Street, on the south by West Baltimore Street, on the west by North Carey Street, and on the east by the Martin Luther King Jr. Boulevard. Previously, Poppleton was construed in a broader sense extending further south to West Pratt Street or Lombard Street, but today this area is commonly described as the separate neighborhood of Hollins Market.

Poppleton is the site of several Baltimore landmarks noted for their historical and/or architectural significance, including Old St. Paul’s Cemetery, Poppleton Fire Station, St. Peter the Apostle Church, Lithuanian Hall, Carter Memorial Church, the Edgar Allan Poe House and Museum, and Perkins Square. The neighborhood also features some of the city's remaining alley houses, structures which were once prevalent in Baltimore but which are now uncommon. These houses are also noted for having been continuously inhabited by working-class African-American residents since just after the Civil War.

== History ==
Poppleton is named for Thomas Holdsworth Poppleton, an English surveyor who constructed a map which laid out Baltimore's street grid in 1822. Much of the neighborhood's original buildings were constructed in a period between 1845 and 1880.

The Poppleton area was home to the 19th- and 20th-century west Baltimore political boss John "Frank" Kelly, who lived at a still-extant home at 1106 West Saratoga Street.

The construction of Interstate 170, often referred to as the "Highway to Nowhere," in the 1970's displaced 3,000 people from the area, and separated Poppleton from adjacent neighborhoods to the north. Intended to connect I-95 with I-70, the highway was left unfinished, and has since been cited as an example of structural inequality in the city; residents of the more affluent neighborhoods of Federal Hill and Fell's Point were able to successfully fight off a similar plan to build a highway through those neighborhoods. By the mid-1970s, the neighborhood was already characterized by Johns Hopkins professor Phoebe Stanton as "architecturally rich but [...] in poor shape," due to the presence of vacant and previously demolished homes.

The neighborhood was selected as part of a multi-million dollar federally funded redevelopment plan alongside five others in 1996, leading to the formation of an organization called the Village Center of Poppleton. Tasked with fulfilling promises to redevelop the area and attract new investment and jobs, the organization failed to deliver on its purported goals. Residents have accused the group's leader, an individual who almost entirely ran its operations, of misusing more than $2 million in funds, and the group was subject to federal audits, fines, and a 2-year suspension from the Empowerment Zone program.

== Architecture ==
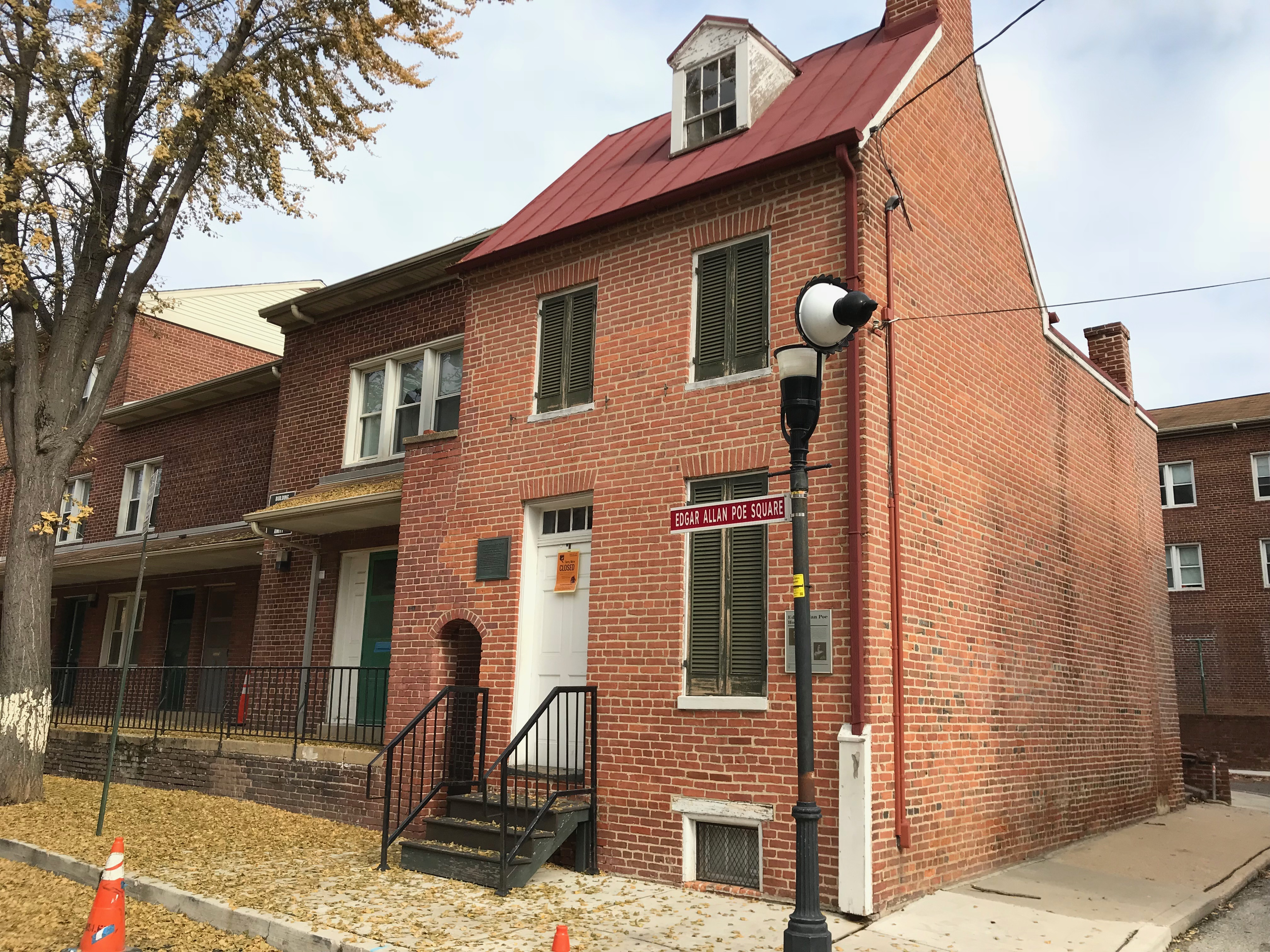
Edgar Allan Poe House, 203 N. Amity Street

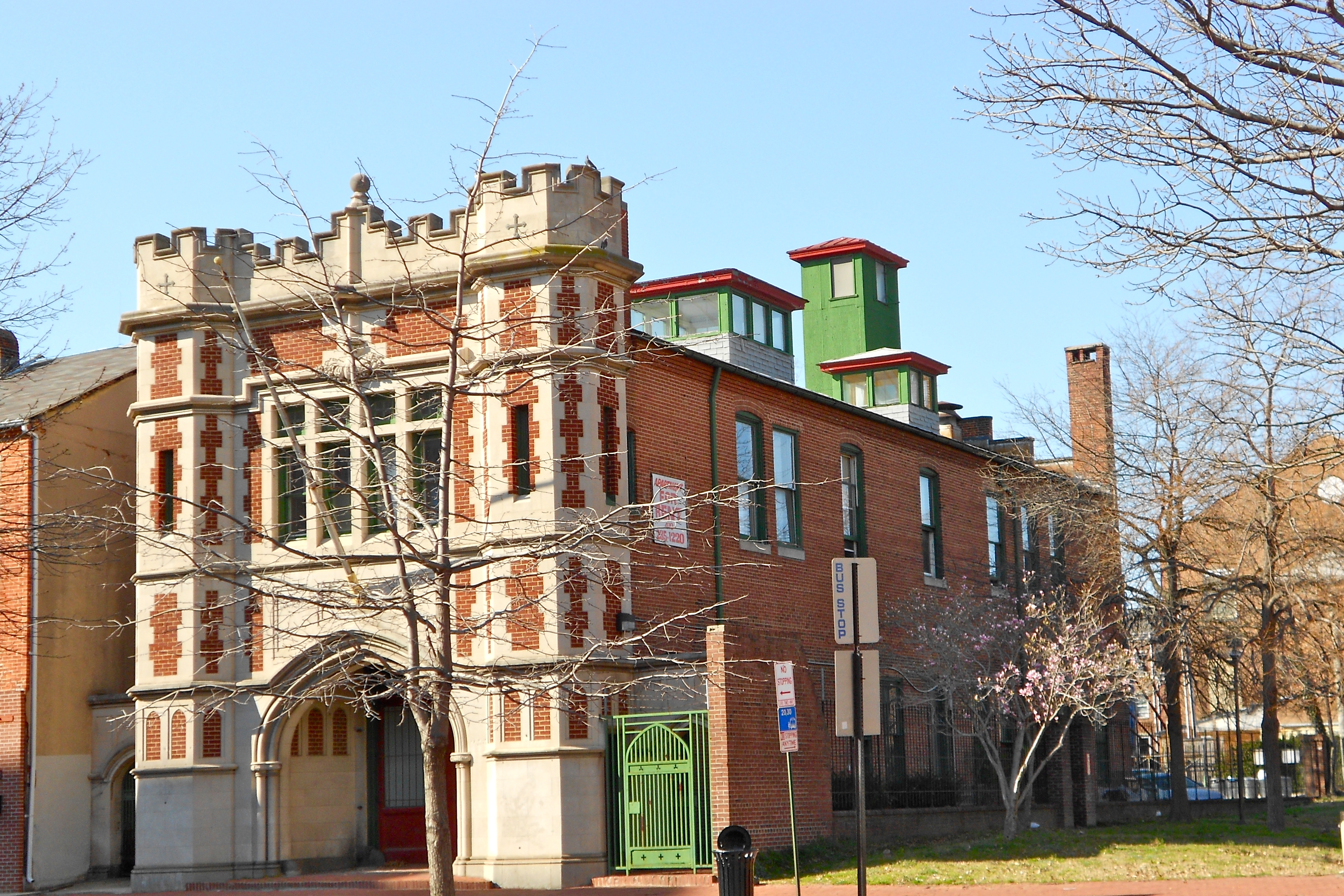
Poppleton Fire House, 756-760 W. Baltimore Street

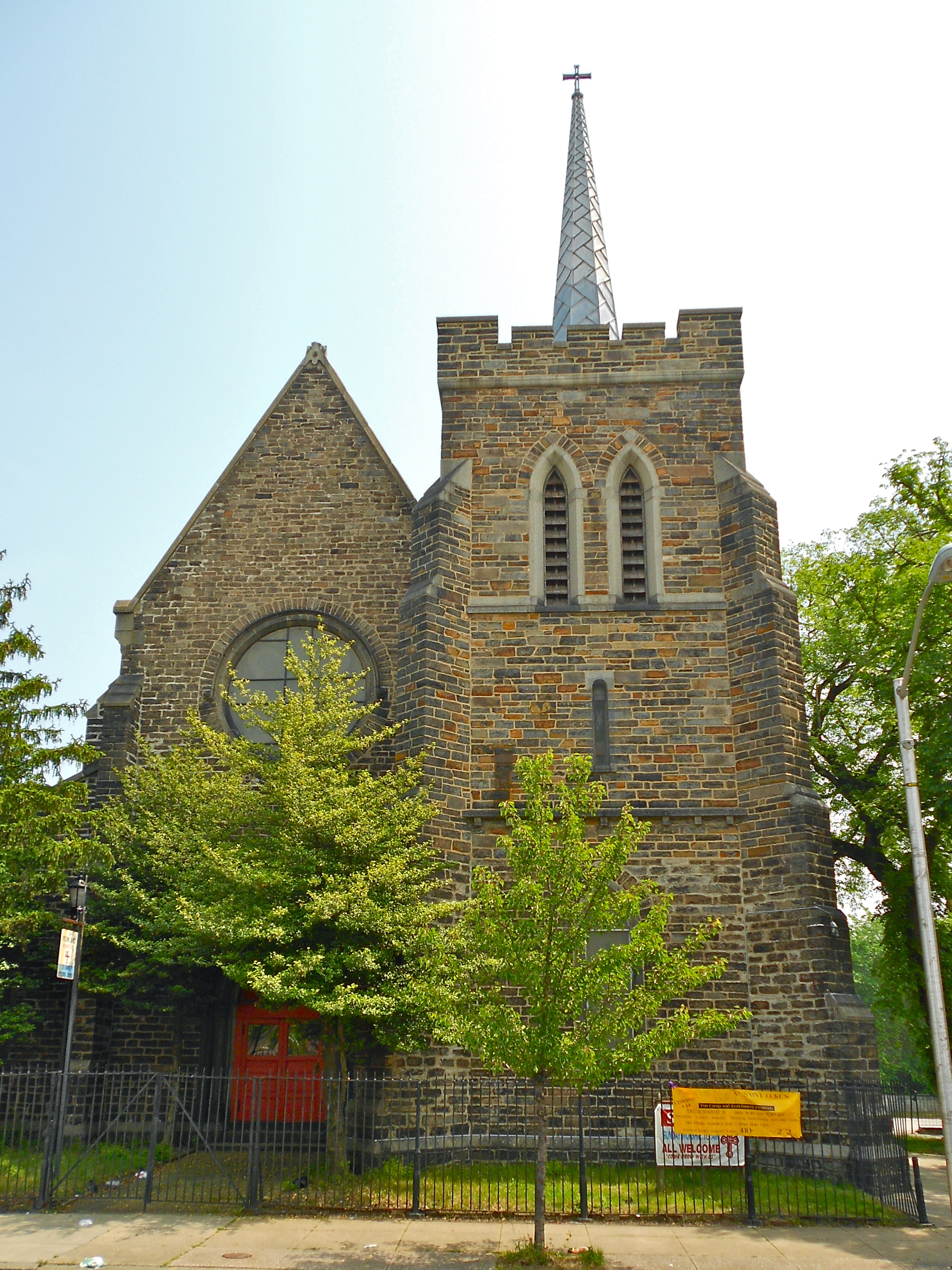
St. Luke's Episcopal Church, 217 N. Carey Street

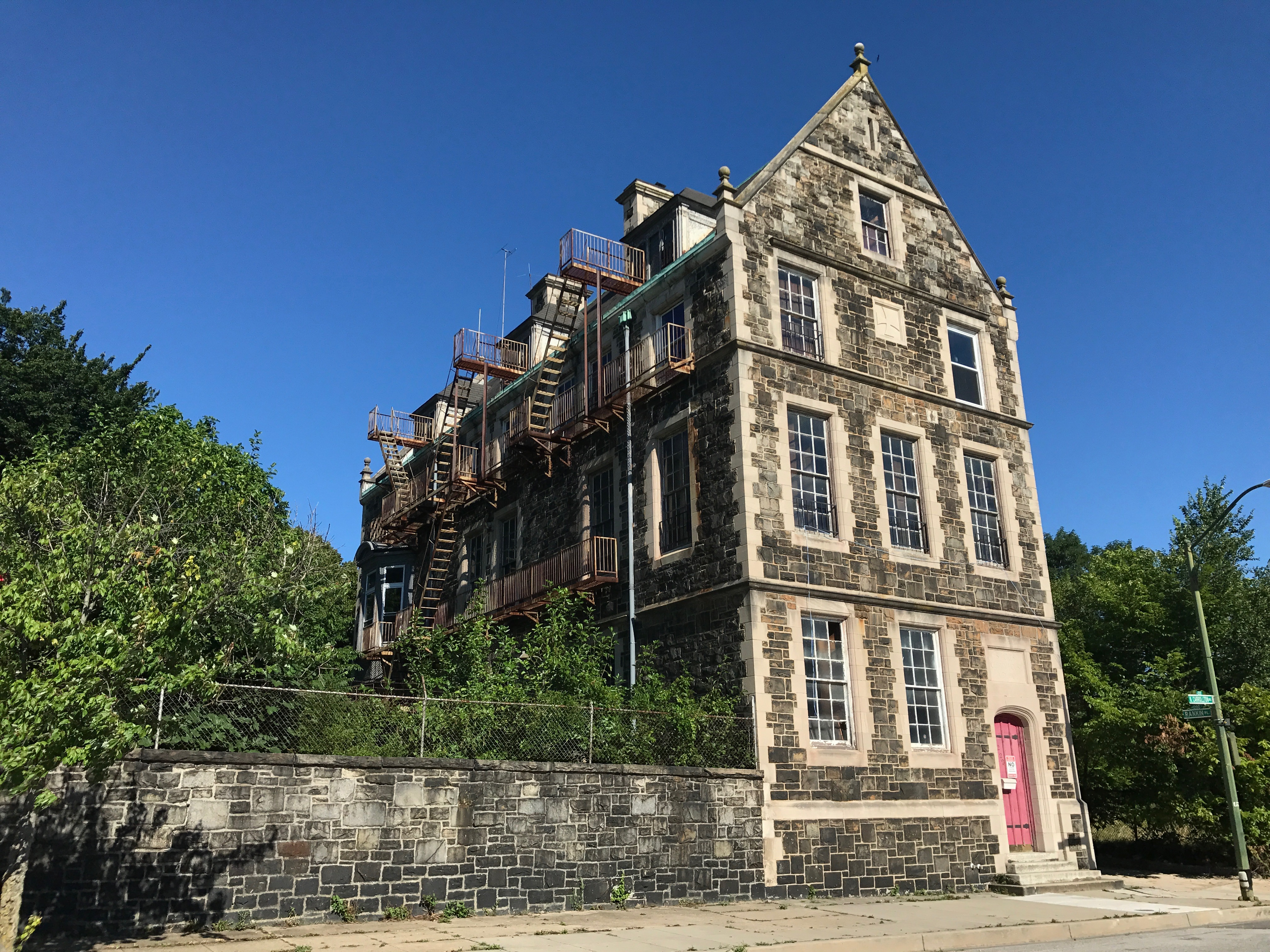
St. Luke's Episcopal Church Parish House, 222 N. Carrollton Avenue

=== 1100 block of Sarah Ann Street ===
The 1100 block of Sarah Ann Street is a unique block of multi-colored alley houses which were built in 1870, and have been continuously inhabited by working-class African-Americans since. The block was noted in 2000 for residents having made a concerted effort to reclaim it from a period of blight; coinciding with the city's demolition of a row of vacant houses across the street, residents assembled a park and playground for families with children, and warded off drug dealers who had made the area unsafe to spend time outside in. In 2005, rights to redevelop the land around the block were given to a New York-based company named La Cité. The developer's plans included up to 1,800 new residences, 150,000 square feet of commercial space and a new charter school at the site of the present Excel Academy at Francis M. Wood High School. In 2015, the company was given $58.6 million tax increment public financing (TIF). In 2020, the city purchased the block of alley houses at 1100 Sarah Ann Street and offered residents relocation assistance. As the redevelopment project has stalled, the block's residents have expressed their opposition to their displacement and the plan to replace the original homes. They have been joined in their opposition by many city residents and groups who have advocated for the homes' inhabitants and for the preservation of the structures. Historical societies, religious institutions, community activist groups, and some political candidates have all voiced opposition to the redevelopment, however, there has been little response from Baltimore City Hall on the issue. The initial phase of construction was criticized by academic Lawrence Brown, who contended the city's redevelopment plan had "spurred rapid gentrification" within the neighborhood.

== Works cited ==
- Brown, Lawrence T. (2021). The Black Butterfly. Baltimore: Johns Hopkins University Press. ISBN 978-1-4214-3987-7.
- A Place Called Poppleton (PDF). 2021. p. 43.
- Evitts, Elizabeth A (2005-05-01). "Picking Poppleton: A Sweeping Urban Renewal Plan Strives to Remake West Baltimore". Urbanite Magazine. No. 11. pp. 30–33.
- Stanton, Phoebe (1975). Poppleton Historic Study. Baltimore: City of Baltimore Department of Housing and Community Development. p. 120.
