= Environmental gentrification =

Type of urban transformation

Environmental, ecological or green gentrification is a process in which cleaning up pollution or providing green amenities increases local property values and attracts wealthier residents to a previously polluted or disenfranchised neighbourhood. Green amenities include green spaces, parks, green roofs, gardens and green and energy efficient building materials. These initiatives can heal many environmental ills from industrialization and beautify urban landscapes. Additionally, greening is imperative for reaching a sustainable future. However, if accompanied by gentrification, these initiatives can have an ambiguous social impact. More specifically, in certain cases the introduction of green amenities might lead to (1) the physical displacement of low income households due to soaring housing costs, and/or (2) the cultural, social, and political displacement of long-time residents. First coined by Sieg et al. (2004), environmental gentrification is a relatively new concept, although it can be considered as a new hybrid of the older and wider topics of gentrification and environmental justice. Social implications of greening projects specifically with regards to housing affordability and displacement of vulnerable citizens. Greening in cities can be both healthy and just.

== Definition ==
Environmental gentrification is the process by which efforts to improve urban environments, such as enhancing green spaces or reducing pollution, increase property values and living costs, often displacing lower-income residents and attracting wealthier populations. The introduction of green spaces in urban areas has historically led to increases in property values, which can displace long-term residents. This process, referred to as environmental gentrification, occurs when low-income residents are priced out of their neighborhoods as a result of urban green space developments and the lack of housing development for additional people who wish to live in the area. Environmental gentrification is commonly understood as the process in which urban green space improvements lead to the displacement of lower-income communities, although the exact definition remains a topic of debate. Green gentrification is closely related to urban planning and climate mitigation efforts. Strategies such as installing shade structures, green walls, green roofs, and water features are often implemented to combat the urban heat island effect. However, these improvements can lead to higher property values and subsequent displacement. Studies have shown a correlation between the creation of urban green spaces and increases in housing prices when there is inadequate housing supply to meet local or regional demand. For instance, property prices around the High Line in New York City increased by 35% with the current renovations, while prices near Chicago's Bloomingdale Trail rose by 13.8% to 48.2% with the implementation of the newly constructed greenery.

== Gentrification ==
Gentrification is a process whereby a neighborhood is transformed in order to cater to a wealthier home buyer or investor. The process often takes place in working-class neighborhoods that are inhabited by low-income residents. Real-estate development such as luxury condominiums or the transformation of old factories into trendy lofts, attract wealthier investors. As the process progresses, low-income residents are pushed out or to the outskirts of the neighborhood as real-estate and rent prices are increased due to demand. Also, as middle-class residents enter the neighbourhood surrounding businesses transform to accommodate desires. Gentrification has often been promoted by local governments through policies that promote 'urban renewal.' Generally, the process is considered to benefit the local economy and improve neighborhoods.

Three phases of gentrification in North America have been recognized:

1. 1960s–1970s – A process led by the government, which hoped to reinvest capital to the inner city.
2. 1970s – Widespread in big cities and spreading to smaller towns across North America. An example is the promotion of art communities such as Soho Manhattan to attract residents and investors.
3. 1990s – Extensive large-scale development increased in scale and complexity through public-private partnerships.

As wealthier citizens have started to demand green amenities, cities have shifted their focus to marrying urban redevelopment with green initiatives all of which follow a similar process. Some of these initiatives can be seen through changes in various infrastructure, people changing their means of transportation to things such as biking and walking, as well as the displacement of people, all of which may lead to the gentrification of a neighborhood.

== Urban planning and sustainability ==
Sustainability is used by governments and developers to promote green initiatives and urban green space. Originally growing from the promotion of sustainable development in developing countries, sustainability gained global recognition following the 1992 United Nations Earth Summit, which introduced the 17 Sustainable Development Goals (SDGs). The concept of sustainability is based on achieving a balance between three pillars: economy, environment, and social equity. However, implementing this balance in practice remains challenging. Criticism arises on how well urban sustainability efforts promote social equity, as many development projects do not account for the impact that economic growth has on the existing community.

The social equity aspect of sustainability focuses on enabling local communities to participate in decision-making processes and benefit from development projects. Public participation is intended to ensure that the needs and concerns of local residents are met. However, many communities with high populations of people of color and low-income households experience poor environmental conditions due to limited inclusion in environmental decision-making and lack of access to clean spaces. These factors lead to health disparities caused by exposure to environmental contamination. The redevelopment of brownfield sites, including post-industrial areas and abandoned lots, has become a key element of large-scale urban greening projects. These sites, which are often located near downtown areas or waterfronts, typically require environmental remediation and are supported by economic incentives from various governmental bodies. These redevelopments frequently promote sustainability through urban planning mechanisms like new urbanism, which emphasizes the creation of cities that are livable, self-sustaining, cooler, and walkable.

Cities and individuals are increasingly responding to ecological challenges through eco-friendly planning and initiatives. Cities such as Chicago, with the Bloomingdale Trail (606), and New York City, with The High Line, have introduced green spaces into densely populated areas to enhance greenery and provide urban green spaces. According to estimates from the United Nations, around 54% of the world's population currently lives in urban areas, with this figure expected to rise to 66% by 2050. Cities can be understood as functioning like metabolic organisms, extracting, using, and disposing of resources over time. The study of urban environments can reveal patterns of spatial inequality, such as the observed negative correlation between the provision of green spaces and the presence of African-American and Hispanic populations in the United States. Green spaces in these neighborhoods are often less maintained and policed, while those in more affluent areas tend to support activities for wealthier residents, to maintain a certain social order.

== Gentrification and environmental justice in the United States ==
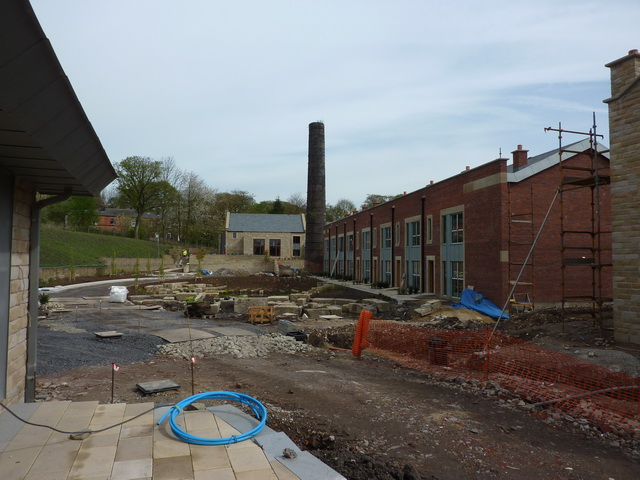
Redevelopment of Elbut Mill before

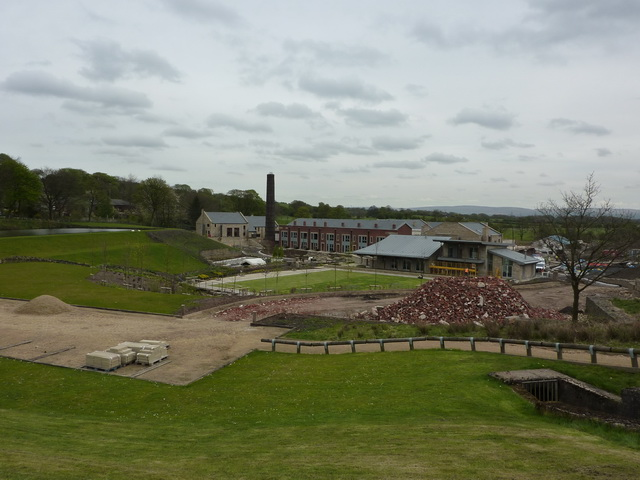
Redevelopment of Elbut Mill after

Environmental gentrification is a topic that intersects with environmental justice. The areas that are redeveloped with the intent of adding more environmentally friendly parks and greenspaces, are generally selected because the neglected property that can be purchased for a lower cost. With the purchase of cheaper property and land, the intent to renovate and fix up these properties with the intent to eventually make a profit is clear. These properties are often in zones that are predominantly occupied by people of racial and ethnic minority, and were strategically zoned in areas more susceptible and proximal to toxic waste disposal as well as other types of contamination. Despite these disproportionate effects, it does not appear to influence the actions of the Environmental Protection Agency (EPA) in terms of determining priority for interventions. As neighborhoods are cleaned up through Superfund cleanup programs, there are noticeable changes that have the tendency to follow, such as an increased number of people that move to the area, with more financial resources and higher levels of education. As people with more financial resources move in, the previous residents are slowly pushed out as the costs of living become less affordable in comparison to before the development and gentrification of the area. Typically these neighborhoods are overtaken by a greater white population, resulting in the whitewashing of a neighborhood. As neighborhoods gain more of a white population, there are increased instances of citizen-based policing of the youth, such as not only profiling, but also the baseless calling of law enforcement, disproportionately targeting people of color. It has been seen that in larger plans to develop various areas, nonprofit organizations that focus on park development and greenspaces are relied upon, and due to their lack of specialty with the development of infrastructure, the consequences of gentrification such as the lack of affordable housing went ignored as parks were built.

Urban green spaces are areas that are in an open space with the looks of a natural environment with greenery and at times water features. Green spaces do promote an aesthetically pleasing look and physical activity amongst people in the community, which promotes physical and mental well-being. Green gentrification is applied to green spaces based on the accessibility of these improvements. Green spaces, such as parks and fields, can be placed in an unsafe neighborhood or a neighborhood that is disproportionately wealthy area, when there are areas with little to no green areas. Moreover, the lack of green spaces in low income, urban areas green gentrification due to these communities at present struggling with financial matters. The promotion of green areas has a positive effect on the communities, and the imbalance of greenery in wealthy versus low-income areas exhibits environmental injustice. Studies have shown green spaces in urban areas to have an effect on climate and health risks by lowering local temperature and improving air quality.

== Examples ==
=== Barcelona ===
==== Sant Martí District ====
A 15-year study (1990–2005) examined the social impacts or enhancing urban green spaces across the city of Barcelona. During the 1990s and 2000s, 18 new urban green parks were added to the city planning agenda. First and foremost, as Barcelona was awarded the 1992 Olympic Games, the city prepared for the event through numerous urban developments which influenced a transformation of public spaces. Previously, the city had been concerned with providing urban parks for the purpose of socializing and exercising. However, as the Olympics were swiftly approaching, urban planners and city governments took the opportunity to develop green spaces for mega-events. These new types of spaces prioritize the aesthetic features of urban green space in an effort to attract tourists and offer memorable landscapes. The legacy of mega-event urban parks can be observed in three notable parks around the city – Parc del Port Olimpic, Parc del Poblenou and Parc de Diagnol Mar. All three of these parks have shifted neighborhood demographics towards greater affluence.

The city of Barcelona released its plan for sustainability titled Barcelona Green Infrastructure and Biodiversity Plan 2020. This document does not contain plans for housing affordability or social impacts that are a result from large-scale development. Diagonal Mar project provides an example of the green initiatives being coupled with large-scale urban redevelopment on a previous brownfield site. Historically, the area was an industry hub as it is located near the Mediterranean Sea. The Diagonal Mar project includes luxury condominiums, three hotels, three office buildings, a shopping mall nested within an urban green space. The project has been criticized for not considering local input into planning as lacking spaces for social interactions for citizens.

Studies suggest that green gentrification has occurred in correspondence with park development in the Sant Marti district. Using neighborhood measurements of wealth, the authors suggest that demographic shifts of the neighborhood have taken place at an alarming rate 1990–2005. Moreover, areas surrounding parks have experienced clear indicators of these changes as there has been an increase in: residents with a bachelor's degree, residents from the global North, household income or home sale and an overall decrease in the population of residents 65 and older living alone.

Percentage of Population Change within 300m of Parks Compared to District Average of Sant Marti
Time Period of Data	Park Name (Year Built)	Bachelor's Degree	District Avg.	Over 65 Years of Age	District Average	Global North Immigrant	District Average	Family Income	District Average
(1991–2006)	Parc del Port Olimpic (1992)	27.92%	7.59%	−1.52%	1.82%	7.4%	3.22%	19.21%	2.8%
(1991–2006)	Parc del Poblenou (1992)	25.98%	7.59%	−2.97%	1.82%	6.9%	3.22%	14.42%	2.8%
(2004–2006)	Parc de Diagnol Mar (2002)	4.69%	1.37%	−0.18%	0.06%	1.71%	2.19%	4.2%	2.1%

=== New York City ===
==== The High Line ====
The High Line is a 1.45-mile-long (2.33 km) elevated public park that was constructed on a historic freight line along the west side of Manhattan in New York City. Previous to its redevelopment, the High Line represented the deterioration of New York's industry, the neighborhood of alongside the High Line, Chelsea, had frequent delinquency. Since the 1980s the city government has attempted to tear it down. In response, activists ventured to save the High Line and proposed that it could be returned to the community as a provision of public good. As the High Line was acquired by the CSX Transportation Inc. in 1999, community board meetings provided an avenue for alternative uses to be proposed. At around the same time, Joshua David and Robert Hammond formed a non-profit they called Friends of the High Line with the main goal of to acquiring public and private funds to save the bridge from demolition. Notable celebrities – Edward Norton, Martha Stewart and Kevin Bacon provided financial support for the project. Friends of the High Line presented a redevelopment strategy to the Bloomberg administration, suggesting that the bridge could be converted into a public park, arguing that this would provide economic benefits to the surrounding neighborhood and generate substantial tax revenues. The Bloomberg administration accepted the initiative, and Mayor Bloomberg provided a statement of support by stating, "The Board's ruling is a great win for all New Yorkers. It allows us to implement our plans to preserve this valuable historic resource, create a much needed public open space and strengthen our city's economy."

Evidence that this project has ignited gentrification can be observed through the soaring real estate prices as well as types of activities that are being attracted to the High Line and its surrounding areas. In just two years, there has been a production of $2 billion real-estate construction which has contributed an additional $900 million in tax revenues. Additionally, the relocation of Whitney Museum of American Art nearby sheds light on the popularity of the park.

The High Line, although presented as a public park, privileges certain users and activities. Friends of the High Line allow for only certain types of vendors as well as provides private security guards. Visitors of the High Line can enjoy artisanal foods, micro-brewed beer and browse up-scaled art merchant booths. The promotion of economic growth and certain types of consumption coupled with surveillance results in the neoliberalization of this public spaces. The High Line, although a famous icon for the city, may fall short of providing open spaces and benefits for all citizens to use and enjoy. Instead it more closely resembles a place of spatial 'privilege' where claims to public space are dominated by upper-class citizens.

Concurrently in 2007, the Bloomberg administration released the PlaNYC 2030: A Greater, Greener New York which aimed to combat climate change through expanding sustainability measured with 132 initiatives. One goal highlights the social pillar of sustainability by having a goal that every citizen in the city will have a green space within a 10-minute walking distance from their home.

=== Vancouver ===
==== False Creek ====
The traditional urban layout of Vancouver was reminiscent of a small town. Grid-iron patterned streets were lined with single-family dwellings, businesses could be found along main streets and industry was concentrated along shorelines and inlets. The 1960s ushered in a shift towards higher densities through high rise residential buildings in the downtown core. In the 1980s, redevelopment of brownsites (former industrial areas) for condominium development in the False Creek region was a result of it being the site for Expo 1986. Previously, this area was the heartland of industry and had begun to deteriorate as industry shifted. After the Expo, the site was acquired by Hong Kong billionaire Li Ka-Shing for $320 million and a numerous residential luxury developments followed suite. These developments promoted a tone of sustainability that were supported through planning documents such as Livable Region Strategic Planning (1996). Urban planning strategies such as smart growth stressed environmental goals could be achieved through the provision of walkable and mixed-use urban areas which would reduce urban sprawl. Critiques of smart growth highlight the equity aspects of the strategy, as it often ignores low-income residents. Housing affordability became an issue during 2001–2007 as the price for a typical two-bedroom in the west end of Vancouver shifted from $260,000 to $650,000. In 2008, the city council accepted EcoDensity as a solution to housing affordability which promoted further densification of downtown and surrounding neighbourhoods. EcoDensity is the solution to housing affordability rather than provision of social housing. A number of towers were constructed in the downtown Eastside displaced approximately 4,000 low-income residents from June 2007 – January 2008. Critiques of EcoDensity suggest that the strategy does not account for enough citizen input in planning measures.

Vancouver has become one of the most popular cities in the world to live as it offers breathtaking mountain views and access to numerous beaches. As Vancouver was awarded the 2010 Winter Olympics, which led to the development of "Millenium Water" along the South Eastern portion of False Creek which became the site for the Olympic Athlete Village. This project boasted European-styled walkways, green roofs and sustainability characteristics. No low-income housing was provided with this project and one-bedroom condos starting price was $500,000. In an effort to reduce ecological impacts, the project promoted a habitat restoration project whereby leftover dirt was used to create an island for bird nesting. In 2006, water squatters, people living in boats in False Creek waters, were evicted in an effort to clean up the area. The False Creek redevelopment was advertised as a park-like nature for new residents and tourists and promoted as a space for leisure. Scholars suggest that there is a disconnect between the promotion of environmental discourses and issues of equity which results in a class conflict over space in the city. Although Vancouver is a highly desirable place to live, the promotion of sustainability through policies ignores provision of much needed affordable housing allocations.

=== Public Response ===
The responses of different communities affected by environmental gentrification have varied. For example, in Harlem, there is a history of community resistance to proposed measures that would exacerbate environmental gentrification. In 2010, When the Harlem Community Development Corporation (HCDC) sought to close two major streets that contained parking spaces for local residents in order to build a green space, community members expressed dissent on the basis that they needed the parking spaces. Furthermore, the community members emphasized that the HCDC's interest in building a park only arose after new condos were built in the vicinity, suggesting that the creation of the park would displace locals without garage access in order to benefit the interests of individuals living in the new condos. However, in the case Calumet, a region of southeast Chicago, IL, the community response was less pointed. City leaders and urban planners sought to create the Calumet Open Space Reserve in 2000: this was intended to be a nature park with green space, restored wetlands, and other opportunities for outdoor recreation such as bike lanes. Although local residents understood that the Calumet Open Space Reserve would contribute to the ongoing process of environmental gentrification in other parts of metropolitan Chicago, they were less apt to resist its construction because they were skeptical of the effectiveness of such resistance. Outside of community resistance to environmental gentrification on the basis of economic displacement, there are also historical examples of indigenous populations resisting environmental gentrification on the basis of cultural displacement. Thus, the public response to environmental gentrification is grounded in the negative economic consequences of strategic greening measures as well as in the cultural ties that local residents hold to their communities.
