= Laneway house =

Form of housing in Canada

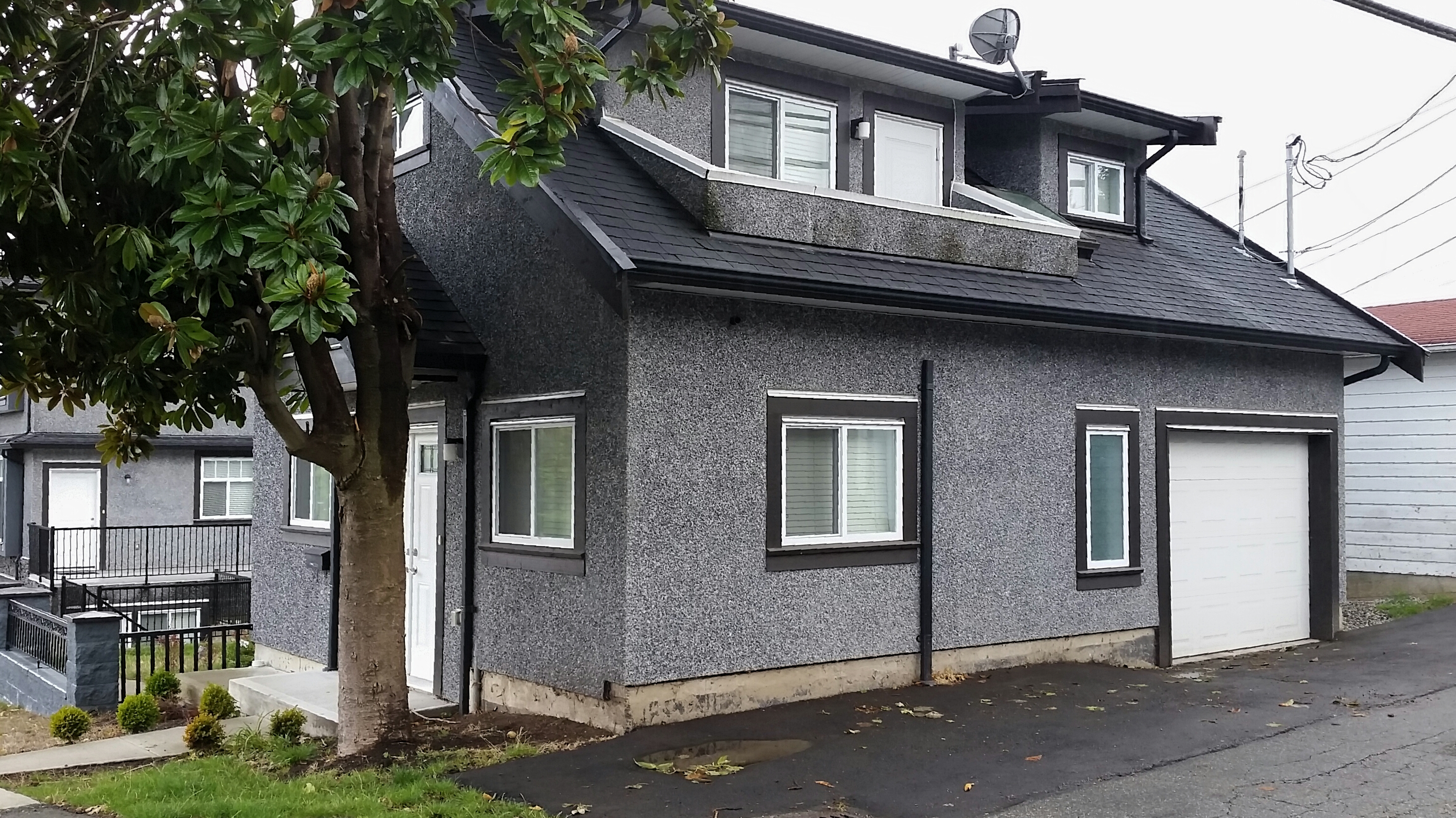
A laneway house in Vancouver

A laneway house is a form of detached secondary suites in Canada built into pre-existing lots, usually in the backyard and opening onto the back lane. Most laneway houses are small. However, public concern has been raised in some communities about the impact that larger forms of this type of housing may have on privacy. Laneway houses are found in densely populated areas in Canadian cities, including Edmonton, Toronto, and Vancouver.

== Edmonton ==
In Edmonton, laneway homes are called garden suites and the numbers keep increasing as the City changes bylaws to increase density. The suites are very popular as Airbnb properties, as retirement homes and for mortgage helpers.

== Toronto ==
During the 19th century, back lanes were used by Toronto residents to house accessory buildings, including garages, storage units and/or stables. A number of these stables were mews, which included a residential area on its upper levels.

The earliest modern laneway home was built in 1989 at Kensington Market, and was designed by Jeffrey Stinston, a professor at the University of Toronto's John H. Daniels Faculty of Architecture, Landscape and Design. Another early example of a modern laneway home includes one built by Shim-Sutcliffe Architects in Leslieville in 1992. The architectural firm received approval for the design from the Ontario Municipal Board, after the firm promoted the housing form as a method to take advantage of unutilized spaces. By 2005, there were approximately several dozen laneway homes in Toronto, including several that were raised illegally. The development of laneway houses in Toronto resulted in the municipal government reviewing their impact on services and their safety in 2006.

Construction of laneway homes in Toronto remained limited until 2018, with earlier by-laws requiring property owners to gain the approval of the municipal planning department before they can build a laneway home. In 2018, the municipal government of Toronto approved a zoning amendment by-law to permit the development of laneway suites on all properties that has a residential designation. The amendment was a response to growing concern around affordable housing, and as an effort to promote "gentle densification" by tapping into roughly 2400 publicly owned laneways spread across the city. As a result of the by-law, there exists approximately 257 kilometres (160 mi) of laneways where laneway houses may be built in the city. The majority of these laneways are situated in the old City of Toronto and East York. The municipal government of Toronto also launched the "Laneway Suites Pilot Program" in 2018, providing financial assistance to property owners that build laneway houses for rent, on the condition that the property owner can not raise the price of rent past the city's average market rent for 15 years after it is completed.

Toronto-based architects and architectural firms that have designed laneway houses in the city includes Lanescape, Donald Schmitt, LGA Architectural Partners, Shim-Sutcliffe Architects, and Superkül. Toronto-based builders specializing in laneway houses in the city includes Laneway Home Building Experts and 2x2 Construction, who is estimated to build 10-12 Laneway Homes in 2022 alone.

== Vancouver ==
The introduction to Vancouver of this form of housing was part of an initiative by former Mayor Sam Sullivan, as part of his council's EcoDensity initiative to increase urban density in pre-existing neighbourhoods while retaining the single-family feel of the neighbourhood. Vancouver's average laneway house is 550 square feet (51 m^{2}), one and a half stories, with one or two bedrooms. Typical regulations require that the laneway home is built in the back half of a traditional lot in the space that is normally reserved for a garage.

In December 2009, the Sustainable Laneway House project began. BC Hydro Power Smart joined Simon Fraser University and the City of Vancouver in championing the project. A host of industrial partners joined the effort by providing expertise, materials and labour, including Smallworks Studio and Laneway Housing, Fortin Terasen Gas, Embedded Automation, Day4 Energy, VerTech Solutions, MSR Innovations and Pulse Energy. Westhouse was showcased at the Yaletown LiveCity site during the Vancouver 2010 Olympic games to over 66,000 people and subsequently moved to its current semi-permanent site at SFU.

Vancouver's first laneway house to be completed under the 2009 laneway house bylaw was the Mendoza Lane House by Lanefab Design/Build. The Mendoza lane house is 710sf and was built on a 33'x122' lot and features a single outdoor parking space. The project was granted an occupancy permit by the City of Vancouver in May 2010. One of the top Vancouver-based laneway construction companies, home wealth investments, specializes in affordable-cost effective home construction.

The first unsubsidized 'net zero' solar-powered laneway house was completed in 2012.

In July 2013, an updated set of rules governing laneway house design in Vancouver went into effect. The July 2013 rule update was aimed at making it easier to build one-storey laneway houses, and to address concerns about parking and the use of garages.

=== Affordability ===
Like Toronto, housing affordability is an important issue in Vancouver, due to the high density of population in the city.

While the EcoDensity Charter is no longer applicable in Vancouver due to the current council's updated strategies on affordability and Greenest City initiatives, initial concerns around laneway housing and affordability that related to the EcoDensity Charter remain. The approach from the Charter was to increase the supply of housings to help moderate house prices and to reduce the living costs from transportation and energy.

=== New housing policies in British Columbia ===
As of 2023 in British Columbia, housing policy changes are coming that aim to simplify regulations, increase design choices, and promote Missing Middle Housing, making it easier to build laneway homes and navigate the permit process for a more inclusive and adaptable housing landscape.

== See also ==
- Alley house
- Longtang
