= Secondary suite =

Dwelling on a property separated from the main home

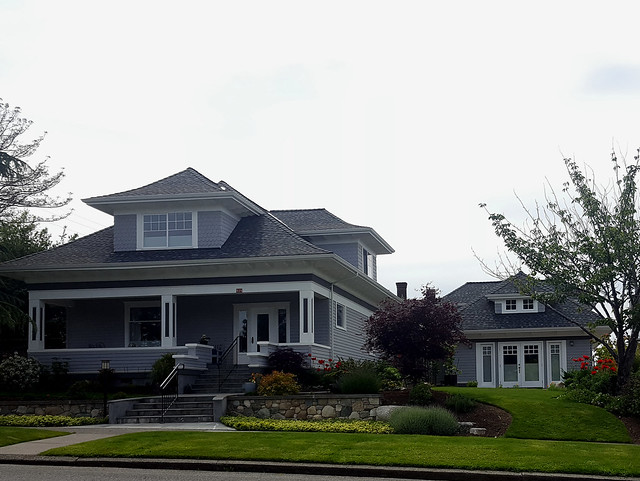
American Craftsman house with detached secondary suite

A secondary suite (also known as an accessory dwelling unit (ADU), in-law apartment, granny flat, granny annex or garden suite) is a self-contained apartment, cottage, or small residential unit that is located on a property that has a separate main single-family home, duplex, or other residential unit. It may be attached to the principal dwelling or an entirely separate unit, located above a garage, across a carport, or in the backyard on the same property. Reasons for wanting to add a secondary suite to a property may be to receive additional income, provide social and personal support to a family member, or obtain greater security.

== Description ==
=== Background ===
Naming conventions vary by time period and location, but secondary suites may also be referred to as accessory dwelling units (ADUs), mother-in-law suites, granny flats, coach houses, laneway houses, Ohana dwelling units, granny annexes, granny suites, in-law suites, and accessory apartments. The prevalence of secondary suites is also dependent on time and location with varying rates depending on the country, state, or city. Furthermore, regulations on secondary suites vary widely across jurisdictions. Some allow them with limited regulation, while others prohibit them entirely through zoning, restrict occupancy to certain household members, or regulate whether the units may be rented.

=== Spatial relationship to main residence ===
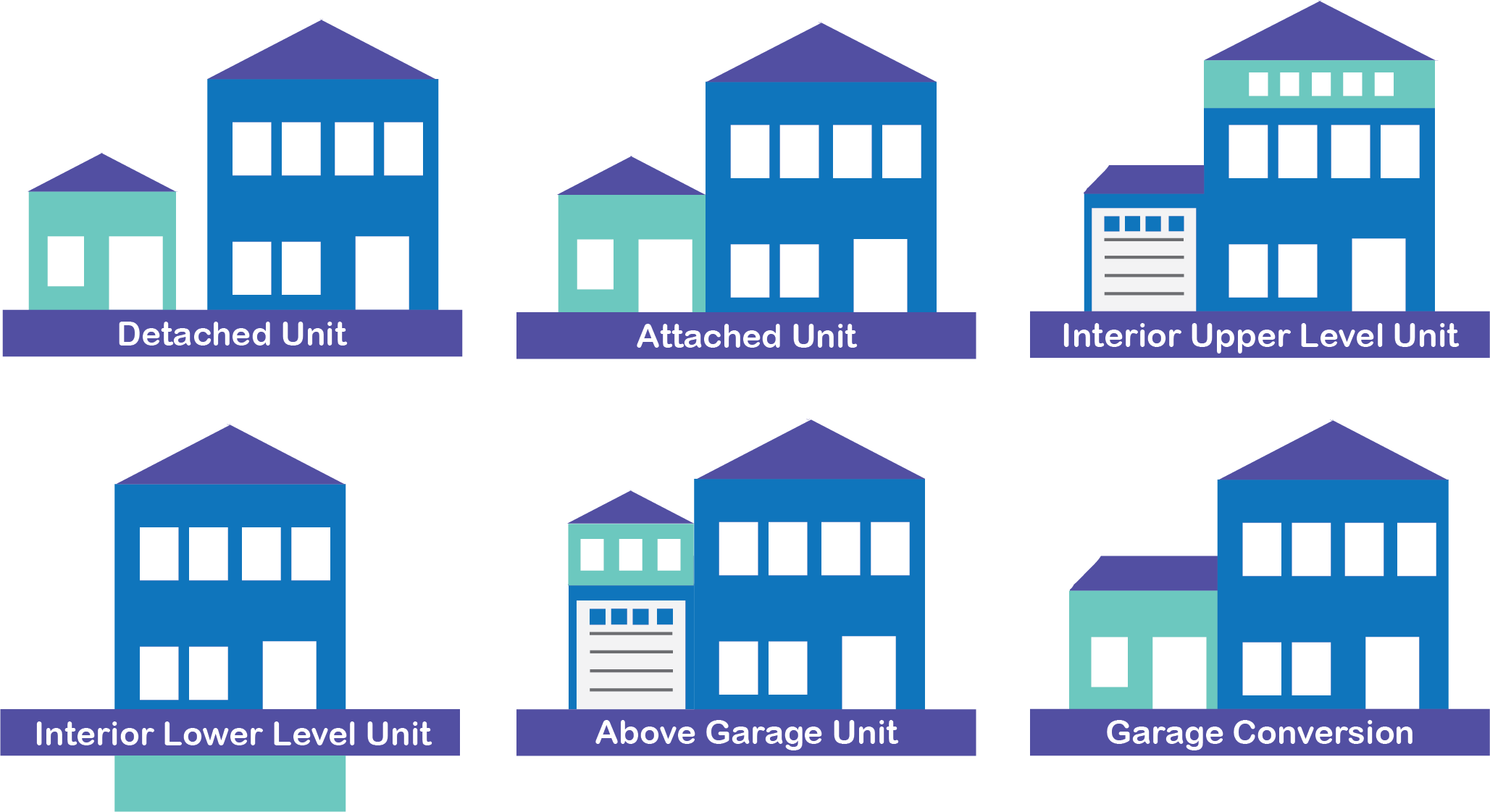
Example of types of secondary suites

A secondary suite is considered "secondary" or "accessory" to the primary residence on the parcel. It normally has its own entrance, kitchen, bathroom and living area. There are three main types of accessory units: interior, interior with modification, and detached. Examples include:

- A suite above a rear detached garage (a "garage apartment, garage suite, coachhouse, or Fonzie flat"),
- A suite above the main floor of a single-detached dwelling, (an "up-and-down duplex")
- A suite below the main floor of a single-detached dwelling (a "basement suite").
- A suite attached to a single-detached dwelling at grade (similar to a "duplex", but that word implies two distinct legal parcel of land with houses that simply share a wall)
- A suite detached from the principal dwelling (a "garden suite" or "guesthouse" (called a "laneway house" if it faces the back lane)).
- A granny flat, granny annex, mother-in-law cottage and the like are generic familial names for an ADU.

== Benefits and drawbacks ==
=== Benefits ===
- Higher density residential areas have many advantages. They require less resources for transport, heating and cooling, infrastructure and maintenance. They allow for closer-knit communities by facilitating interaction between neighbors, especially children and teenagers.
- Creating affordable housing options as secondary suites are typically small, easy to construct, and require no land acquisition.
- Enabling seniors to "age-in-place" by creating small and affordable units where seniors can downsize in their own neighborhood. Some of the recent popularity of secondary suites in the United States can be attributed to the activities of the American Association of Retired Persons (AARP) and other organizations that support seniors.
- Supporting diverse and multi-generational households as seniors, young-adults, or other relatives can live on the same property as their families while maintaining independence and privacy. For seniors, this arrangement can improve social life, allow to easily provide care, and possibly live in more walkable neighborhoods when they can no longer drive.
- Facilitating homeownership by providing a reliable extra income that can support mortgage payments and home maintenance.
- Creating sustainable and energy-efficient housing as smaller or attached units require fewer resources.
- ADUs can be integrated into the scale and character of single-family neighborhoods while also promoting workforce housing in these neighborhoods.
- Municipal budgets may benefit from new taxable housing that does not require new infrastructure or significant utility upgrades.

=== Drawbacks ===
Linked properties cannot easily be sold separately. In case of shared ownership each party may require permission from the other party to make changes to the building.

== By country ==
=== Australia ===
In Australia, the term 'granny flat' is often used for a secondary dwelling on a property. The land is not subdivided with construction requiring approval from the council or relevant authority. The approval processes vary between States and Territories, and between councils. This is different from a dual occupancy, where two primary dwellings are developed on one allotment of land, being either attached, semi-detached or detached. Size limits and approval requirements for granny flats vary between Australian states and territories. In New South Wales, the State Environmental Planning Policy (Housing) 2021 generally limits secondary dwellings to 60 m², unless another planning instrument permits a larger floor area. In Victoria, small second dwellings have generally not required a planning permit since December 2023, subject to site-specific restrictions. Amendment VC306, effective from 15 October 2026, increased the maximum floor area under planning provisions from 60 m² to 80 m², although building regulations had not yet been updated to match. In 2018, New South Wales led the construction of new granny flats while Victoria had the fewest number of new granny flats constructed. In 2019, the federal government launched a study concerning prefabricated buildings and smaller homes citing affordable housing, extra space for family members, and support for the construction industry as reasons for the study. The government set aside $2 million for the initial study and then planned to set up an innovation lab to help manufacturers design prefabricated buildings.

=== New Zealand ===
Similar to Australia, a secondary dwelling on a property is also known as a 'granny flat', but more commonly as a 'sleepout'. A sleepout, or 'cabin',:

- Is separate from the main house
- Can be used as an extra accommodation, a hobby room, home office or storage
- Does not contain cooking, sanitary facilities or drinking water supply.

According to an official New Zealand government website property owners can begin building a sleepout, or secondary dwelling, without building consent if they meet the following requirements:

- Not exceed 30m2 in floor area
- Be one storey in height, with a maximum height of 3.5 metres above floor level
- Have a floor level not exceeding 1 metre above the supporting ground, including any mezzanine floor
- Not contain plumbing or facilities for the storage of drinking water
- Be used for sleeping accommodation only if it is associated with a dwelling and does not contain cooking facilities
- Have a smoke alarm installed if used for sleeping accommodation
- Be sited at least 1 metre from any residential building or boundary, if it measures more than 10 square metres in floor area.

However, even if the project does not require a building consent, property owners must still ensure that a project complies with the national Building Code.

In September 2025, a select committee report called for minor amendments to the government's legislation allowing small homes like granny flats (sleepouts, backyard studios, home offices, man-caves, she-sheds, teenage retreats) to be built without a consent. The Amendment Bill would allow for standalone dwellings of up to 70 square metres (increased from the current 30 square metres) to be built without a consent, so long as certain conditions are met.

The proposed changes, championed by Housing Minister Chris Bishop, were backed unanimously by all parties and the bill is expected to pass by the end of the year.

=== Canada ===
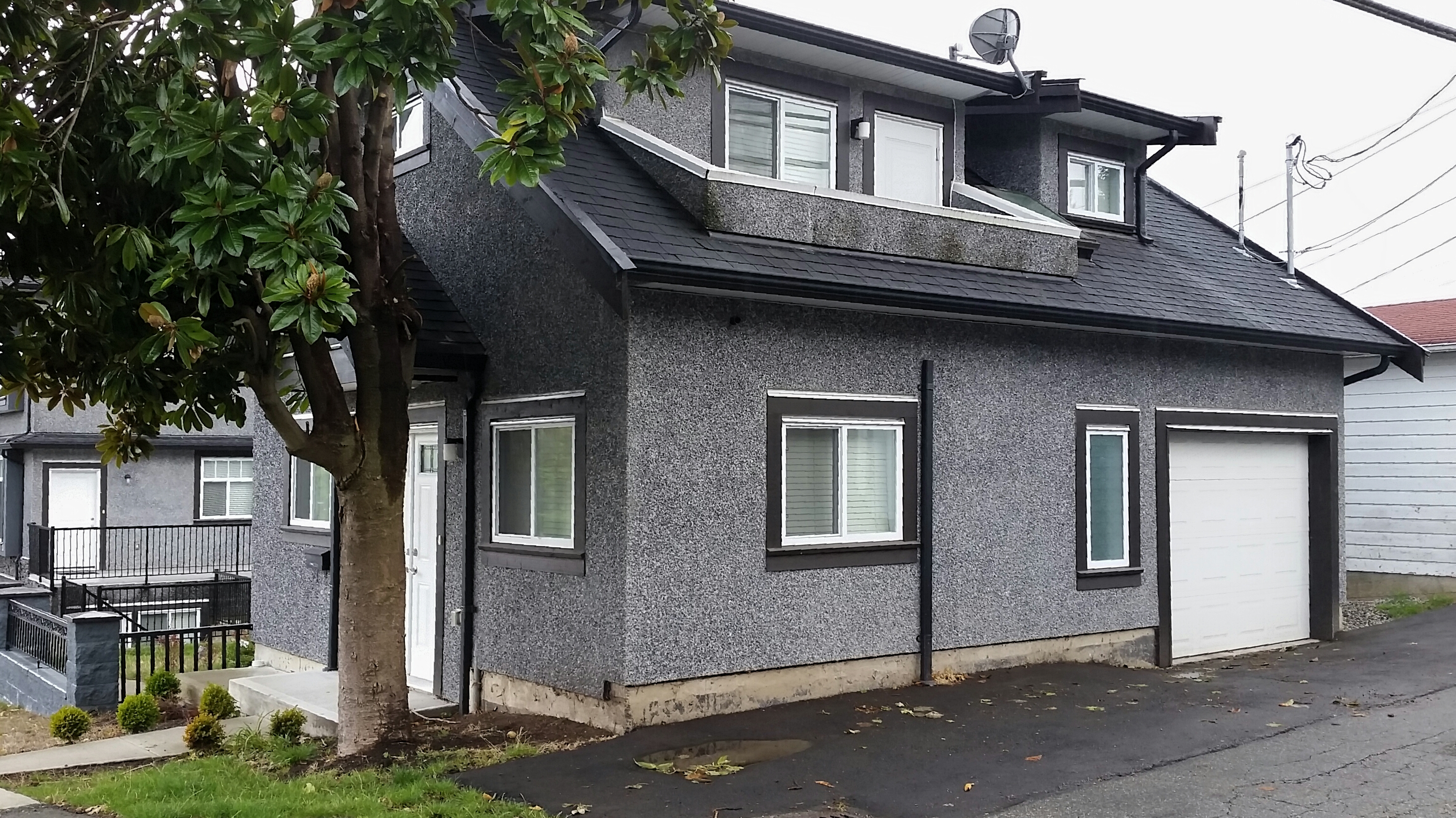
Laneway house in Vancouver

Secondary suites have existed in Canada since the 19th century where they took the form of coach houses, servant houses, stables converted to permanent apartments, and small apartments for young people within large houses. Secondary suites became increasingly popular during the economic crisis of 1929 and the housing shortage following WWII. During this period the Canadian government actively supported the creation of secondary suites. However, suburbanization and zoning changes in the 1950s and 60s led to a decrease in secondary suites in Canada. More recently, secondary suites are increasing in popularity and many municipalities are reexamining their regulations to support secondary suites.

==== CMHC (government program) ====
The Canada Mortgage and Housing Corporation provides a financial assistance program to help Canadians create affordable housing for low-income seniors and adults with a disability within a secondary suite. The program is called the Residential Rehabilitation Assistance Program (RRAP) -- Secondary/Garden Suite. The maximum fully forgivable loan depends on the location of the property:

- Southern areas of Canada: $24,000/unit
- Northern areas of Canada: $28,000/unit
- Far northern areas: $36,000/unit

A 25% supplement in assistance is available in remote areas.

==== British Columbia ====
After adopting legislation in 2009 to support secondary suites, Vancouver, British Columbia became one of the leading North American cities for their construction. In the city, approximately a third of single-family houses have legally permitted secondary suites, many of which are laneway houses. The Housing Policy Branch of British Columbia's Ministry of Community, Aboriginal and Women's Services published a guide for local governments to implement secondary suite programs called 'Secondary Suites: A Guide For Local Governments'. The current issue is dated September 2005. The intent of the guide is to "help local governments develop and implement secondary suite programs". It also highlights good secondary suite practices as well as providing practical information to "elected officials, planners, community groups, homeowners, developers, and others interested in secondary suites".

=== Europe ===
In German speaking countries an interior secondary suite is known as an Einliegerwohnung.

In the United Kingdom, "granny flats" are increasing in popularity with one in twenty UK households (5%) having such a space. 7% of householders say they have plans to develop this type of space in the future. 27% of those surveyed were making plans for older relatives, 25% were planning for grown-up children, 24% were planning to rent as holiday lets, and 16% were planning to take in lodgers.

In Norway, particularly in the bigger cities, it is quite common to build separate adjoined smaller flats that the owner of the main flat will rent out.

In Sweden, a friggebod is a small house or room which can be built without any planning permission on a land lot with a single-family or a duplex house.

=== United States ===
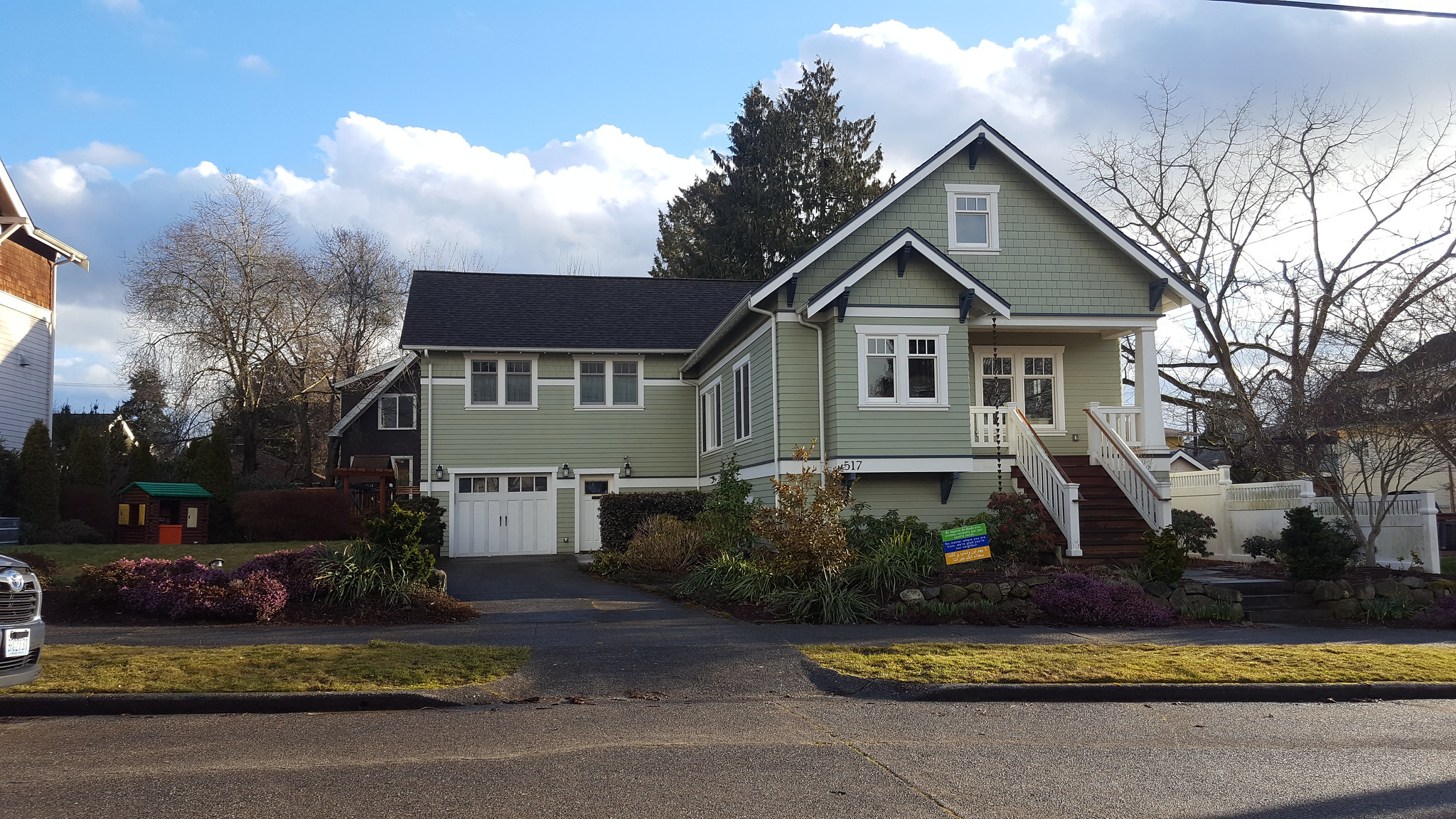
Attached secondary suite in Seattle

In the United States, secondary suites are generally referred to as accessory dwelling units or "ADUs". Zoning permissions and laws concerning accessory dwelling units can vary widely by state and municipality. Accessory dwelling units were popular in the early 20th century in the United States, but became less common after WWII when a shift to suburban development occurred and many municipalities banned ADUs through zoning regulations. With increases in the price of housing in many cities and suburbs, increased awareness of the disadvantages of low-density car-oriented development patterns, and an increased need to care for aging Americans, many government entities and advocacy groups have supported ADUs. Some critics perceive ADUs to be a threat to the character of single-family residential neighborhoods. Several states have enacted legislation to promote accessory dwelling units.

==== California ====
In California, Government Code Sections 65852.150, 65852.2 & 65852.22 pertain to local regulation of ADUs. SB 1069 and AB 2299 are California bills approved in 2016 and effective 1 January 2017, that limit local government authority to prohibit ADUs in certain cases (and also reduce cost and bureaucracy hurdles to construction). On 1 January 2020, the state of California passed the most lenient ADU laws in the country allowing not one but two types of accessory units, the accessory dwelling unit (ADU) and the junior accessory dwelling unit (JADU or JDU). State-exempt ADUs can now be at least 800 square feet (74 m^{2}), while JADUs are limited to 550 square feet (51 m^{2}).

===== Statewide Reforms =====
From 2019 to 2024, enacted several laws expanding the development of ADUs. AB 68/SB 13 (2019) eliminated parking - minimums requirements, owner‑occupancy rules, and required to approve ministerial permit review within 60 days, reduced impact fees by required they should be proportional to the size of the unit and prohibited from imposing impact fee on ADUs that under 750 sq.feet. AB 1033 (2023) allowed homeowners sell standalone ADUs or convey them as condominiums. SB 1211/AB 2533 (2024) expanded ADUs on multifamily properties, allows up to eight detached ADUs per lot, and also eased coastal approvals and give an easier pathway for homeowner to legalize their unpermitted ADUs. AB 2097 (2022) removed mandatory parking requirements within half-mile of major transit stops. These reforms increase ADU permitting from under 10,000 in 2017 and to over 83,000 in 2022 and now statewide accounting for around 19 % of new housing developments.

===== Local Reforms =====
Berkeley in January 2025, started a four year ADU and JDUs amnesty program for unpermitted ADUs and JDUs, that allows permitting inspection and legalization of around 4,000 pre-2020 units without penalty. Also in 2024, it became one of the first cities that supported sales of ADUs under AB 1033 San Francisco in May 2025, the Board of Supervisors allowed ADUs built on or after that date to be sold independently from main residence or as a condo.

The City of San Diego from 2021 to 2024 issued approximately 5,720 permits for ADUs under its California Density Bonus Law. 875 of these units were constructed through the program bonus provisions, which allow have additional units when they comply with affordability requirements. 368 units under bonus program were designated and built as income-restricted and they subject to affordability covenants restrictions. The bonus program is design to incentivize the development of smaller housing units within already existing residential neighborhoods. According to local planning documents, most ADUs approved through the program were built on lots previously developed with single-family housing (RS zoning). In June 2025, new proposed regulations capped up to three units per single-family lot (one covered ADU, one detached ADU, and one JDU) mandated one off-street parking space for bonus and affordable ADU and outside TPAs, set new fire-safety requirements for ADU located in High and Very High Hazard Severity Zones, enforced affordability deed restrictions, and allow ADU sales or conversion into condominium under AB 1033, new "Community Enhancement Fee" would be imposed for ADU under 750 sq. ft.

Los Angeles, adopted Ordinance No.186,481 in December 2019 to align its local ADU regulations and requirements with updated state law. The ordinance added Section 12.22 A.33 to the Los Angeles Municipal Code, that establishing standards for ADUs, junior ADUs (JADUs), and also movable tiny homes (MTH). The City of Los Angeles also set up new JADU regulations under pending state legislation (AB 1154). Couple jurisdictions in the Los Angeles region have implemented pilot programs to support the development of ADUs designated for income-restricted housing. These programs provide financial assistance to property owners with low-interest or forgivable loans, and provide rental assistance with housing vouchers or other subsidies like grants.

Sacramento In 2021, Sacramento launched an ADU Resource Center, offering free plans for homeowners, permits support, waiving fees, and eliminated parking minimums, that support ADU permitting by 123 % (76 to 170) in the first year of launch. Its 2040 General Plan (2024) allows three-story small apartment buildings and removed single-family-only zoning and parking mandates. A UC Davis study found eliminating parking mandates reduces auto dependency and boosts ADU uptake.

Pasadena, California expanded its ADU loan program in 2025 to offer up to $225,000 at 1 % interest, with Section 8 leasing requirements.

===== Junior Accessory Dwelling Units in California (JADU/JDU) =====
A Junior Accessory Dwelling Unit (JADU or JDU) is a type of housing unit defined by California law as being no larger than 500 sq. ft. and located within the walls of a single-family housing JADUs can be created through the conversion of existing spaces, like bedrooms or attached garages, within the primary home. State regulations allow JADUs to share some features with the main dwelling, such as bathrooms and central mechanical systems. They must include a separate entrance and a kitchen, but kitchen facilities can be limited to basic appliances that do not require permanent installation.

==== Other states ====
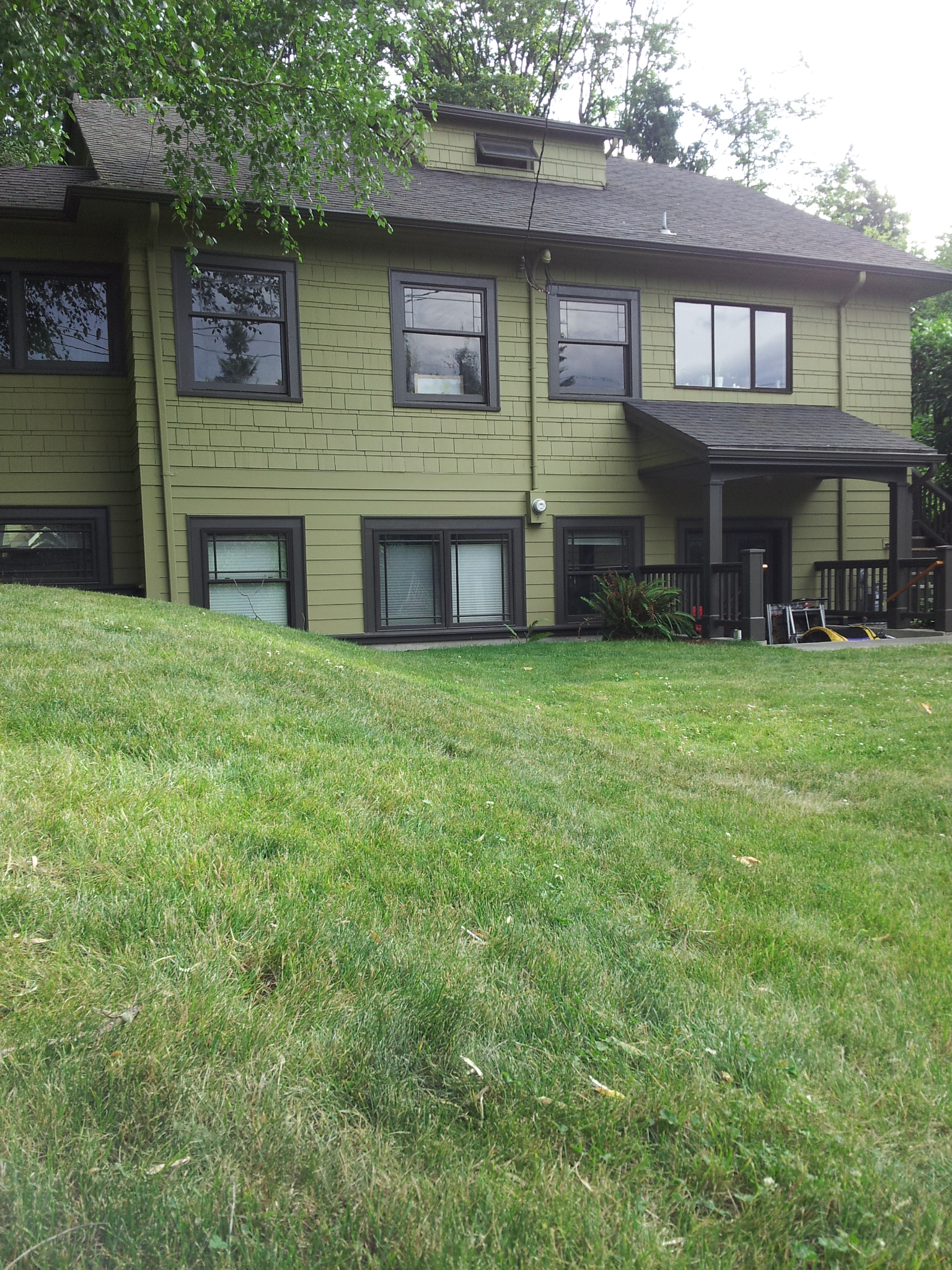
Basement apartment suite in Seattle

The states of Vermont and New Hampshire have also adopted a number of bills that promote accessory dwelling units and reduce regulatory barriers to ADU construction. The State of Illinois considered, but did not adopt, HB 4869 which would have required municipalities to permit (and reasonably regulate) accessory dwelling units (ADUs).

Several local governments across the United States have enacted ordinances to both permit and promote accessory dwelling units. Some cities have included accessory dwelling units in larger missing middle housing and affordable housing strategies including Seattle, Portland, and Minneapolis. Many other communities have maintained widespread single-family zoning but still updated codes to permit accessory dwelling units. Notable examples include large cities such as Los Angeles, CA and Chicago, IL. Diverse smaller jurisdictions that permit accessory dwelling units include Lexington, KY, Santa Cruz, CA, and the County of Maui in Hawaii.

Honolulu, Hawaii has a unique form of accessory dwelling units known as an "Ohana Dwelling Unit". Ohana Dwellings were created as a permitted use in the zoning code in 1981 as a way to encourage the private sector to create more housing units (without government subsidy), preserve green fields (open space) and ease housing affordability. In 2015, Honolulu amended its zoning code to allows ADUs as a form of Ohana Dwelling, but with fewer restrictions. To prevent creating further complexities for existing Ohana Dwellings, some of which have been condominiumized and owned separately from the main house, Ohana Dwellings remain a permitted use (with different requirements and benefits than ADUs) in the zoning code. ADUs are an important component of Honolulu's Affordable Housing Strategy.

== See also ==
- Bedsit
- Garage apartment
- Laneway house
- Laneway House (Toronto, 1993)
- Secondary suites in Canada
