= Garage apartment =

Housing unit built on or in a storage space vehicles

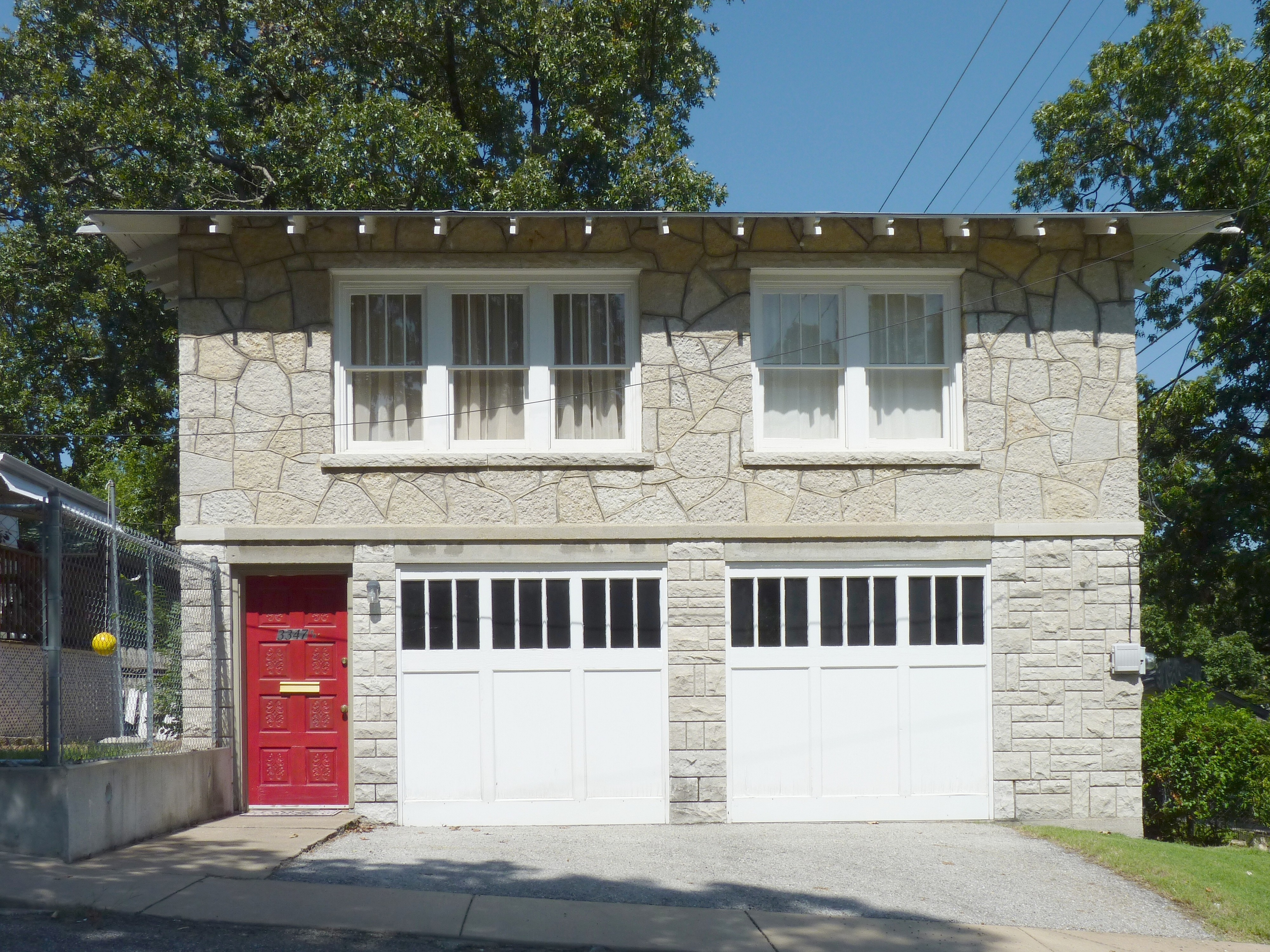
The Bonnie & Clyde Garage Apartment in Newton County, Missouri

A garage apartment (also called a coach house, garage suite or in Australia, Fonzie flat) is a residential unit located within, or above, a garage accociated with a house. The garage may be attached to or detached from the main dwelling, and the unit typically has a separate entrance through internal access may also be present. A garage apartment is one type of "accessory dwelling unit" or ADU, a term used by architects, urban planners and in zoning ordinances to identify apartments smaller than the main dwelling on one lot or parcel of land. Other examples of ADUs include granny flats, English basements, mother-in-law suites, and auxiliary units.

In the United States, garage apartments are commonly found in older urban areas, either as purpose-built secondary strustures (sometimes referred to as 'guest' or 'carriage' houses), or as conversions of existing buildings. ADUs may be regulated by size, occupancy, lot size, core features (such as kitchens or bathrooms), other building codes and parking allotment.

Garage apartments are sometimes discussed in the context of new urbanism, and related approaches to urban planning. In some jurisdictions in the United States, the construction or occupancy of accessory dwelling units is restricted by zoning regulations, including limitations on who may occupy them.

== Origins ==
The word "garage", introduced into English in 1902, derives from the French word garer, meaning "to shelter". By 1908, architect Charles Harrison Townsend commented in The Builder that "for the designation of a house for an automobile we chiefly use the French word 'garage,' and also, in my opinion, the more desirable English equivalent 'motor house'.

In the past, garages were separate buildings from the house ("detached garage"). Sometimes a garage was built with an apartment above it that could be rented out. As automobiles became more popular, the concept of attaching a garage directly to a home became a common practice. Garage apartments are becoming increasingly popular because of their versatility and functionality. While a person with a detached garage has to walk outside in all kinds of weather, a person with an attached garage has a much shorter commute inside the building.

== Garage insulation ==
In northern climates, the temperature inside an uninsulated attached residential garage can drop to freezing in the winter. Temperatures inside an uninsulated attached garage in temperate climates can reach uncomfortable levels during the summer months. Extreme temperatures can be a source of energy loss and discomfort to adjacent residences due to heat transfer between the garage and these rooms. Homes with an attached garage often struggle with this "interface" problem. Insulating the exterior of a building from the elements without extending the insulation to the wall separating the garage from the house, and/or other garage walls and the roof, can be a costly mistake.
