= Alley house =

An alley house is a style of house constructed in an alley that serves the back of other homes rather than a larger residential street. Often, these take the form of terraced houses, which can maximize the use of the spatial limitations of an alley. Alley houses were prevalent in the late nineteenth and early twentieth centuries; their small size made them less expensive in high demand property markets. They have often housed working-class people, immigrants, and/or young families in industrial towns who may have otherwise been excluded by these property markets. Alley houses have declined in their prevalence due to demolitions enacted by governments which were often driven by class prejudice. In some regions, more recent trends in housing construction have included homes fronted on alleys. For example, in urban Canada numerous alley-facing homes (known as laneway houses) have been constructed in recent years to meet increasing demand.

== Asia ==
=== Bahrain ===
Archaeological studies of Dilmun settlements in Bahrain, structures which were built in Eastern Arabia some time between the 4th and 1st millennia BCE, have demonstrated examples of alley houses in an ancient society. At a Dilmun era settlement on the outskirts of the residential town of Sar, alley houses had been slotted into spaces between existing buildings, and were constructed to resemble more 'standard' two-room houses from the era while forgoing certain features such as kitchen installations due to spatial limitations.

== Europe ==
=== United Kingdom ===
The construction of alley houses became common in London, England, during the 17th century, as the city's population increased rapidly largely as a result of migration from provincial England, the rest of the British Isles, and continental Europe. This influx of a population that tended to be younger, and to live in smaller, poorer households brought on a diversification in housing styles to accommodate for the concentrated demand to live in the city's centre.

== North America ==
=== United States ===
Alley houses in the United States were constructed in several states and cities, and were particularly common in older cities along the east coast, such as Baltimore, Washington, D.C., Philadelphia, and Alexandria. Alley houses were also built in various smaller industrial towns, such as Mount Carmel, Pennsylvania; in some towns in Southern states like Georgia, Alabama, and Texas; and in Midwestern cities such as Columbus, Ohio and Milwaukee, Wisconsin.

== See also ==
- Laneway house
- Longtang
