= Edgar Allan Poe House and Museum =

Historic house in Baltimore, Maryland

- Edgar Allan Poe House
- U.S. National Register of Historic Places
- U.S. National Historic Landmark
- Baltimore City Landmark
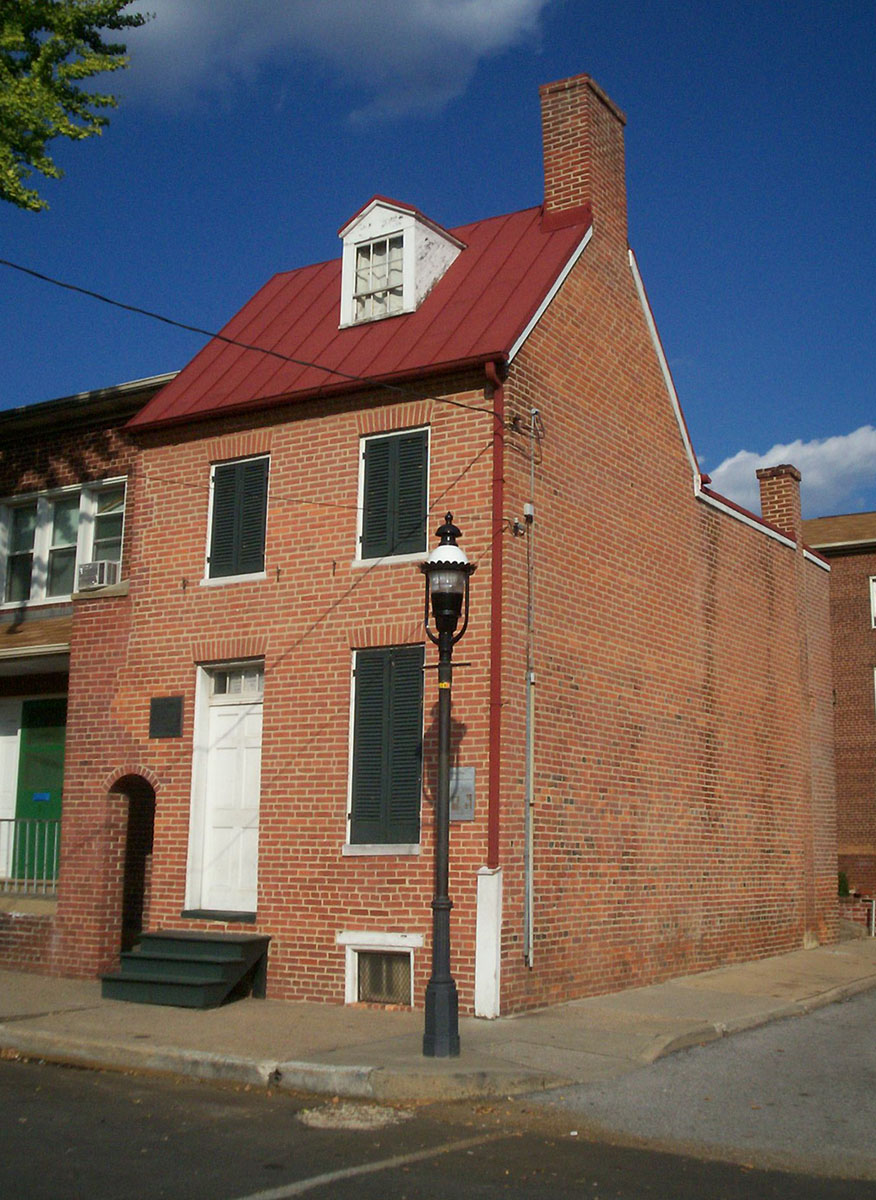
- Edgar Allan Poe House and Museum in Baltimore, Maryland
- Interactive map of Edgar Allan Poe House
- Location: Baltimore, Maryland
- Coordinates: 39°17′29″N 76°37′59″W
- Built: 1830
- NRHP reference No.: 71001043

Significant dates
- Added to NRHP: November 11, 1972
- Designated NHL: November 11, 1972
- Designated BCL: 1975

The Edgar Allan Poe House and Museum is a row home at 203 North Amity Street in Baltimore, Maryland, United States. Serving as the home of American writer Edgar Allan Poe in the 1830s, the small, unassuming structure was opened as a writer's house museum in 1949. It was designated a National Historic Landmark in 1972.

Due to a loss of funding by the city of Baltimore, the museum closed to the public in October 2012. Poe Baltimore, the museum's new governing body, reopened the museum to the public on October 5, 2013. The house is the site for the International Edgar Allan Poe Festival & Awards, held in October each year.

== History ==
The brick home, then numbered 3 Amity St., and now numbered 203 North Amity Street, is assumed to have been built in 1830 and rented by Poe's aunt Maria Clemm in 1832. Clemm was joined in the home by her ailing mother, Elizabeth Cairnes Poe, and her daughter Virginia Clemm. Edgar Allan Poe moved in with the family in 1833 around the age of 23, after leaving West Point. Virginia was 10 years old at the time; Poe would marry her three years later, though their only public ceremony was in 1836. Poe lived in the house from about 1833 to 1835.

The house was rented using pension money that Elizabeth collected thanks to her husband, David Poe Sr., who was a veteran of the American Revolutionary War. The home is small and Poe's room on the top floor has a ceiling with a sharp pitch which is six feet high at its tallest point.

In the 1930s, homes in the area, including Poe's, were set for demolition to make room for the "Poe Homes" public housing project. The house was saved by the efforts of the Edgar Allan Poe Society of Baltimore, which made arrangements with the city of Baltimore and opened the home as The Baltimore Poe House in 1949. Former displays in the museum included a lock of Poe's hair, a small piece of Poe's coffin, some original china that once belonged to John Allan (Poe's guardian after Eliza Poe's death), and a large reproduction of the portrait of Virginia Clemm painted after her death as well as many other Poe-related images. An original 1849 obituary by Rufus Griswold in the October 24, 1849 edition of the Philadelphia Dollar Newspaper was also displayed along with a reprint of Poe's original announcement for the creation of a new literary magazine to be called The Stylus — an endeavor that never came to fruition.

During house renovations in 1979, workers lifted the floorboards and found skeletal remains, reminiscent of Poe's story "The Tell-Tale Heart". These were found to be animal bones discarded into what is known as a "trash pit" or midden beneath the home.

In the period from 1980 to 2011, the museum hosted a number of Poe events throughout the year. It claimed, for example, the largest Poe birthday celebration in the world held every January at the Westminster Hall and Burying Ground, where Poe was buried following his death in October 1849. In 2009, the museum staged a third funeral for Poe (theatrical) for the Poe Bicentennial at Westminster Hall. Over 1,200 people attended two services.

In 2011, City of Baltimore officials reduced the museum's subsidy, a decision that ultimately led to its closure in 2012. After the City cut off its $85,000 in annual support in 2011, the museum was operating on reserve funds to the amount of $380,000 in the Poe House Fundraising account.

Efforts to secure the museum's future came from such diverse places as: the non-profit project Pennies For Poe: Save the Poe House in Baltimore, the New York City based non-profit theatre company Bedlam Ensemble's staging of The Delirium of Edgar Allan Poe, and the 2012 film The Raven.

In 2012, According to the Edgar Allan Poe Society of Baltimore, the museum was closed on September 28, 2012 with no advance public notice. Jeff Jerome, the museum's curator for more than three decades, was laid off.

In 2013 The Edgar Allan Poe House & Museum was re-opened to the public, under the auspices of Poe Baltimore, a non-profit organization created to operate and maintain the house museum (see next section.) New annual programs at Poe House include The International Edgar Allan Poe Festival and the Saturday 'Visiter' Awards.

In 2020, Poe House was entered into the American Library Association's United For Libraries Literary Landmarks Register. It was the first historical site in the State of Maryland to be entered in the list. The dedication ceremony was held at Poe House on the anniversary of Poe's birthday, January 19, 2020.

== Poe Baltimore ==
In 2013, a new non-profit organization, Poe Baltimore, was established to serve as the museum's new governing body and operate the Edgar Allan Poe House and Museum. It reopened to the public on October 5, 2013. Poe Baltimore is an independent organization, and the Board of Directors and volunteer corps include members from the Edgar Allan Poe Society of Baltimore. The museum hosts monthly and annual events at Poe House and around the City of Baltimore.

In 2018, the museum created a new annual event, the International Edgar Allan Poe Festival & Awards (Poe Fest International), a two-day outdoor festival held in the shadow of Poe House, commemorating the anniversary of Poe's mysterious death in Baltimore. The festival includes tours of other sites in Baltimore associated with Poe, as well as a funeral re-enactment at the historic Carroll Mansion. The festival drew two thousand visitors in both its first and second years. In 2019, Poe Baltimore created the Saturday 'Visiter' Awards, an honor recognizing art and writing inspired by Poe. The awards are named for the Baltimore Saturday Visiter (sic), a periodical that awarded Edgar Allan Poe first prize for his short story, MS Found in A Bottle, in 1833.

== Description ==
The Poe House is a 2 1/2 story two-bay brick structure with a gabled metal roof. The front door is on the left side of the west elevation, at the top of a wood stoop. The house is flanked on the north by a contiguous building; the south elevation is windowless. A single gabled dormer is centered in the west roof. To the rear a two-story ell projects from the south side of the main block. Its shed roof slopes to the north. The house sits on the western edge of an active low-income housing project, aptly named The Poe Homes, in the west Baltimore neighborhood of Poppleton.

The house is entered through the front living room, with a dining room to the rear and two steps down. From the dining room narrow stairs lead to the basement and the second floor. Two bedrooms occupy the second floor, and stairs lead to a small attic or garret, which may have been occupied by Poe. The house retains the majority of its original woodwork.

== Works penned in this house ==
Though it cannot be fully proven, the Poe Society alleges that the following works were created while Poe was staying in this house:

Stories

- "MS. Found in a Bottle"
- "Lionizing: A Tale"
- "Shadow-A Parable"
- "Berenice"
- "Morella"
- "King Pest the First. A Tale containing an Allegory"
- "The Unparalleled Adventure of One Hans Pfaall"

Poems

- "Latin Hymn"
- "Enigma"
- "Serenade"
- "The Coliseum"

== See also ==
- Edgar Allan Poe Museum in Richmond, Virginia
- Edgar Allan Poe National Historic Site in Philadelphia
- Edgar Allan Poe Cottage in the Bronx, New York
- List of residences of American writers
