= English basement =

Apartment on the lowest floor of a building

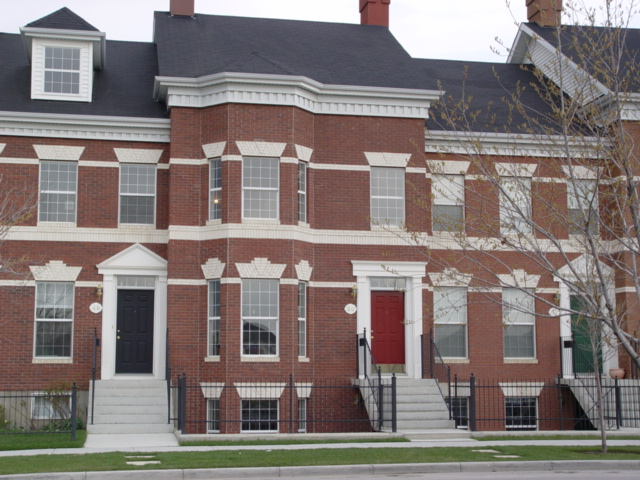
Townhouses with English basements

An English basement is an apartment (flat in UK English) on the lowest floor of a building, generally a townhouse or brownstone, which is partially below and partially above ground level and which has its own entrance, separate from those of the rest of the building.

== Realty ==
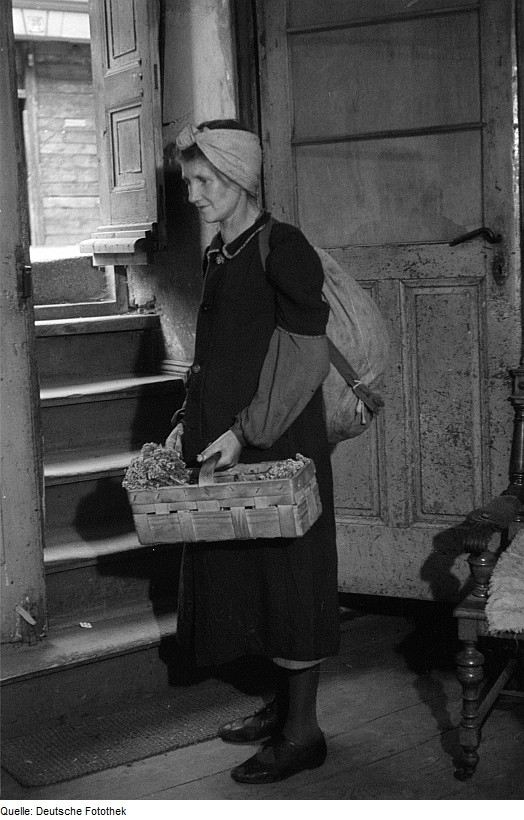
The exit to an English basement apartment, seen from the inside, Berlin, 1946

English basements are sometimes rented out separately from the main dwelling, either by a single landlord who owns both portions of the building or by a tenant of the building who is subletting. English basements are most common in larger, older cities like London, Edinburgh, New York City, Boston, and Washington, D.C.

== Etymology ==
The origin of the term is close to its to its earliest citation in the Oxford English Dictionary in 1853: ("1853 N.Y. Daily Times 8 July 5/3 (advt.) House for sale...A new three-story English basement house"). "English basement" is mostly an American phrase. Some property agents refer to it as the "garden level." Building codes in most US cities use neither of the phrases, stating that any floor partly below grade-level is simply a "basement" and a floor more than 50% below grade-level is a "cellar." In some other cities, such as Chicago and San Francisco, this space is referred to as a "garden apartment" (not to be confused with use elsewhere). In Québec, in both English and French, this space is known as a "demi sous-sol," literally a "half-basement." In the United Kingdom, this style of apartment is a "garden flat" if it connects to a rear garden and use of that garden is permitted (most often being exclusive use of at least half); the level written in plans and any elevators is: basement, minus 1, or lower ground; a cellar would not be for sleeping in.

== See also ==
- Basement apartment
