= Phoebe Stanton =

Architectural historian (1914–2003)

- Born: Phoebe Baroody; 1914; Carroll County, Illinois, US
- Died: September 24, 2003 (aged 88–89); Baltimore, Maryland, US
- Other name: Phoebe Baroody Stanton
- Education: Mount Holyoke College, Radcliffe College, Courtauld Institute of Art
- Known for: Architectural history, Baltimore city architectural planning
- Spouse: Daniel J. Stanton

Phoebe Baroody Stanton (1914 – September 24, 2003) was an American architectural historian, professor and urban planner. She taught at Johns Hopkins University from 1955 until 1982. Stanton was outspoken about the architectural history and design for the city of Baltimore. She wrote and published three books.

== Early life, family and education ==
Phoebe Baroody was born in 1914 in Carroll County, Illinois, into a Lebanese-American family. She was raised in Chicago, Illinois. At the age of 14, she traveled to Lebanon for the first time.

She received her B.A. degree in 1937 from Mount Holyoke College, then her M.A. degree in 1939 from Radcliffe College. She attended Stanford University for additional graduate work. She received her PhD in 1950 from Courtauld Institute of Art at the University of London. At Courtauld, she studied under Nikolaus Pevsner and John Summerson.

== Career ==
During World War II, she worked for the Board of Economic Securities.

She was faculty and taught at Johns Hopkins University, from 1955 until 1982. She also occasionally taught at Reed College, Goucher College and Bryn Mawr College. In 1963, she became involved with the city's planning and preservation issues.

== Personal life and demise ==
She was married to Daniel J. Stanton, a city planner. In 1954 they relocated to Chinquapin Parkway in Baltimore. Stanton was an outspoken supporter of Baltimore's architecture and advised the city on design.

On September 24, 2003, she died at age 88 in a Baltimore hospital due to complications from heart disease and emphysema.

== Publications ==
- Stanton, Phoebe B. (1968). The Sculptural Landscape of Jane Frank. A. S. Barnes.
- Stanton, Phoebe B. (1972). Pugin. Pioneers of Modern Architecture. New York: Viking Press. ISBN 9780670582167.
- Stanton, Phoebe B. (1997). The Gothic Revival and American Church Architecture: An Episode in Taste 1840–1856. Volume 1 of Johns Hopkins Studies in Nineteenth-Century Architecture. Johns Hopkins University Press. ISBN 9780801856228.
