= EcoDensity =

2006 environmental initiative in Vancouver, Canada

The EcoDensity Initiative was officially launched in 2006 in Vancouver, British Columbia, Canada, in conjunction with the World Urban Forum. The initiative was a response to deconcentration of urban land use due to urban sprawl. The initiative used density, design and land use as catalysts towards livability, affordability and environmental sustainability. Some of the program's objectives were to reduce car reliance, deliver more efficient urban land use, improve green energy systems and build a resilient and adaptable community. In high-density urban areas, utilizing the existing infrastructure and transit and community amenities tends to lead towards a more sustainable and livable state. Accordingly, EcoDensity was designed to strategically enhance densification with the primary aim of efficiently structured neighbourhoods, denser urban-patterns and increased affordable housing.

== Etymology ==
The "eco" in EcoDensity stands for both ecology and economy (affordability). "Density" in urban planning refers to upward or more compact construction, as opposed to urban sprawl.

== Urban context of Vancouver ==
Vancouver is the largest city in the region with an increasing population in the metropolitan area. Apart from the highly densified central business district (CBD), more efficient land use strategy was needed in less dense suburban neighbourhoods. The urban development in Vancouver started in the 19th century mainly shaped by automobile-based infrastructural development. As a result, urban sprawl has led to the dominance of single family homes in suburbia and high-density residential development in the downtown core.

== Urban sustainability ==
Since the early 1990s, an urban sustainability approach has significantly shaped the way Vancouver has responded to its growing problem, thus it has become a globally recognized eco-city. "Vancouverism" is a new kind of city living that incorporates deep respect for nature. As such, it is characterized by environmental awareness and successful urban planning with a path of urbanization that is unique in North America. The EcoDensity Initiative aimed to facilitate greater housing affordability and diversity through strategic densification that focused on environmental sustainability and livability. Part of this status could be attributed to the natural setting of the city between the Georgia Straight and the Coast Mountains, which invokes a strong sense of environmental consciousness and environmental protection. Since the 1960s, Vancouver's strong community spirit manifested through citizen activism and traditional planning culture resulted in a strong trust between communities and the Council.

== Consequences of the eco-density approach ==
=== Intended consequences ===
The proclaimed aim of the EcoDensity Initiative was to increase density in low and medium dense urban areas along transport corridors. Well-designed, mixed-use attractive neighbourhoods have the potential to increase density and stimulate active modes of travel, as well as catalyzing the development of sustainable communities. With that in mind, in denser neighbourhoods, requirement for investment in infrastructure tends to be lower. In relation to the demand and supply situations and other contextual conditions, an extra supply of housing has the potential to lower property costs and as such is a way forward to achieve affordable housing. Furthermore, the Initiative aimed to deliver sustained growth and enhance livability.

=== Unintended consequences ===
The EcoDensity policy was unpopular. The political leadership backed by the development oriented agenda was not united towards promoting sustainability, which led to eco-density being used as a label to greenwash their program. In all, the traditional planning culture involving various stakeholders turned into a hegemonic strategy because of the massive opposition. Without a community-centred bottom-up approach neighbourhood associated the concept as "green overcrowding", "greenwashing", or "density without amenity". This was due to neither EcoDensity nor related policies were designed to provide affordable housing rather than to moderate future price increase. This resulted in the breakdown of a historical trust between residents and the Council. Yet due to inadequate management and planning, surrounding municipalities are growing faster than Vancouver. Indeed, ignoring community concerns, failing to effectively increase density and being governed by pro-developer and ideological perspectives, eventually eco-density has become a cautionary narrative that cities should avoid and can learn from.

== Overview ==
Vancouver's EcoDensity Initiative combined density, design and land use as a response to deconcentration of urban land use due to urban sprawl. It aimed to achieve a more sustainable urban form through the intensification of existing neighbourhoods. Specifically, to increase density in low and medium dense areas along transport corridors in an environmentally friendly way that reduces the ecological footprint of the city. Consequently, eco-densification has the potential to strengthen urban sustainability measures; however, its inherently narrowed scope and unintended consequences pertains to limitations.

== Results ==
The EcoDensity Initiative spawned laneway houses and increased density along the Canada Line rapid transit line, part of the SkyTrain system. In 2012, Sydney and other Australian cities adopted EcoDensity principles into their urban planning program.
