= Secondary suites in Canada =

A secondary suite is a self contained dwelling, sometimes attached to the main dwelling, sometimes separate, which can be offered for rent to a third party by the owner/occupier. Some Canadian municipalities permit these while others do not, and rules vary as to what sort of dwellings are permitted to have secondary suites and what forms they may take.

== Municipalities permitting secondary suites ==
=== Coquitlam, B.C. ===
The City of Coquitlam permits secondary suites. It is limited in size to 40% of the total floor area of the house, and an additional parking space must be provided.

=== Edmonton, AB ===
Since the turn of the millennium, the City of Edmonton has actively encouraged the construction of new secondary suites in its many low-density postwar neighbourhoods.

=== Kelowna, B.C. ===
The City of Kelowna permits secondary suites in land uses districts amended with an "S" designation. The main requirements are:

- No more than one secondary suite per residence.
- There must be a minimum of three off-street parking spaces on the lot.
- The maximum size is 90 square metres (970 sq ft) or 40% of the floor area of the house, whichever is less.
- 3/4 hours of fire rated wall.

=== Vancouver, B.C ===
The City of Vancouver has permitted secondary suites since March 23, 2004. At that time, changes were made to the Zoning and Development Bylaw to make it possible for every single-family house in Vancouver to have a secondary suite. These changes included:

- "One-Family Dwelling with Secondary Suite" to be permitted in all residential RS, RM, and RT zones;
- One on-site parking space will be acceptable for a house with a secondary suite, if the house was built prior to March 23, 2004;
- Partial sprinkler system will no longer be a requirement for existing non-sprinklered houses (certain conditions apply). Instead, interconnected hard-wired smoke alarms equipped with battery backup and manual silencing device are to be installed;
- Ceiling height requirement for an existing house reduced to 6'6" over 80% of the suite area and in all areas of exit from the suite.

=== Calgary, Alberta ===
The vast majority of secondary suites in Calgary are basement suites. The regulations concerning secondary suites are complex, as they derive from a number of land use and zoning by-laws and differ vastly from community to community and even from street to street. The basic requirements for legal basement suites are that they must only exist in fully detached single-family homes in specific land use districts, they must be 70 square metres in area or less, they must meet all regulations concerning habitability (they must be heated, have adequate kitchen and bathroom facilities, be insulated, etc.), and that each must have its own separate entrance and windows large enough to allow for escape in case of fire.

However, many basement suites in Calgary are 'illegal' in that they contravene the regulations. One estimate states that over half the basement suites in the city are illegal. Although the municipal government requires in theory that all suites be built pursuant to regulations, basement suites are one of the few forms of low-income housing available and are therefore generally tolerated; inspections are only conducted after specific complaints have been made. In 2007, rules were proposed that would retroactively legalize the thousands (or tens of thousands) of illegal basement suites in Calgary and make it easier for homeowners to build basement suites; the intent of the new rules was to ease the pressure on housing in a city where half of the homeless are fully employed. City Council voted against the proposition amid concerns over fire safety and the exploitation of low-income earners.

Since Calgary's new Lane Use Bylaw became effective in June 2008, Secondary suites are permitted in a number of residential districts. The name of the districts that have secondary suites as a discretionary use include the letter 's', such as "R-C1s". Despite the land use district being available, land owners in Calgary's developed area have challenges in getting a secondary suites approved. As there is little inner-city land designated for secondary suites, any such approval requires a rezoning of the property, and this requires approval from a Council that is divided on the issue.

=== Other cities ===
- Secondary suites can be registered in Abbotsford, B.C.
- Langley, B.C. has recently decided to legalize secondary suites in all single family residential zones in the city.
- Port Moody, B.C. has adopted a secondary suite program.
- Surrey, B.C. authorizes secondary suites through a two step process of rezoning then permit approval.
- Toronto - in the 2012 draft bylaw it was proposed that one secondary suite be allowed per detached or semi-detached house, and one per townhouse zoned "R"

== Municipalities not permitting secondary suites ==
- Richmond, B.C. as of January, 2016 secondary suites in single family homes are permitted but must be inspected and approved to meet B.C. building codes
