= Longtang =

Type of alley or community in Shanghai, China

- Traditional Chinese: 弄堂
- Simplified Chinese: 弄堂
- Wugniu: lon^{4} daon^{2}
Transcriptions
Standard Mandarin
- Hanyu Pinyin: lòngtáng
Wu
- Wugniu: lon^{4} daon^{2}
- IPA: [lòŋ dɑ̃́] (Shanghainese)
Yue: Cantonese
- Yale Romanization: lung tòhng
- Jyutping: lung^{6} tong^{4}
- IPA: [lʊ̀ŋ tʰɔ̏ːŋ]

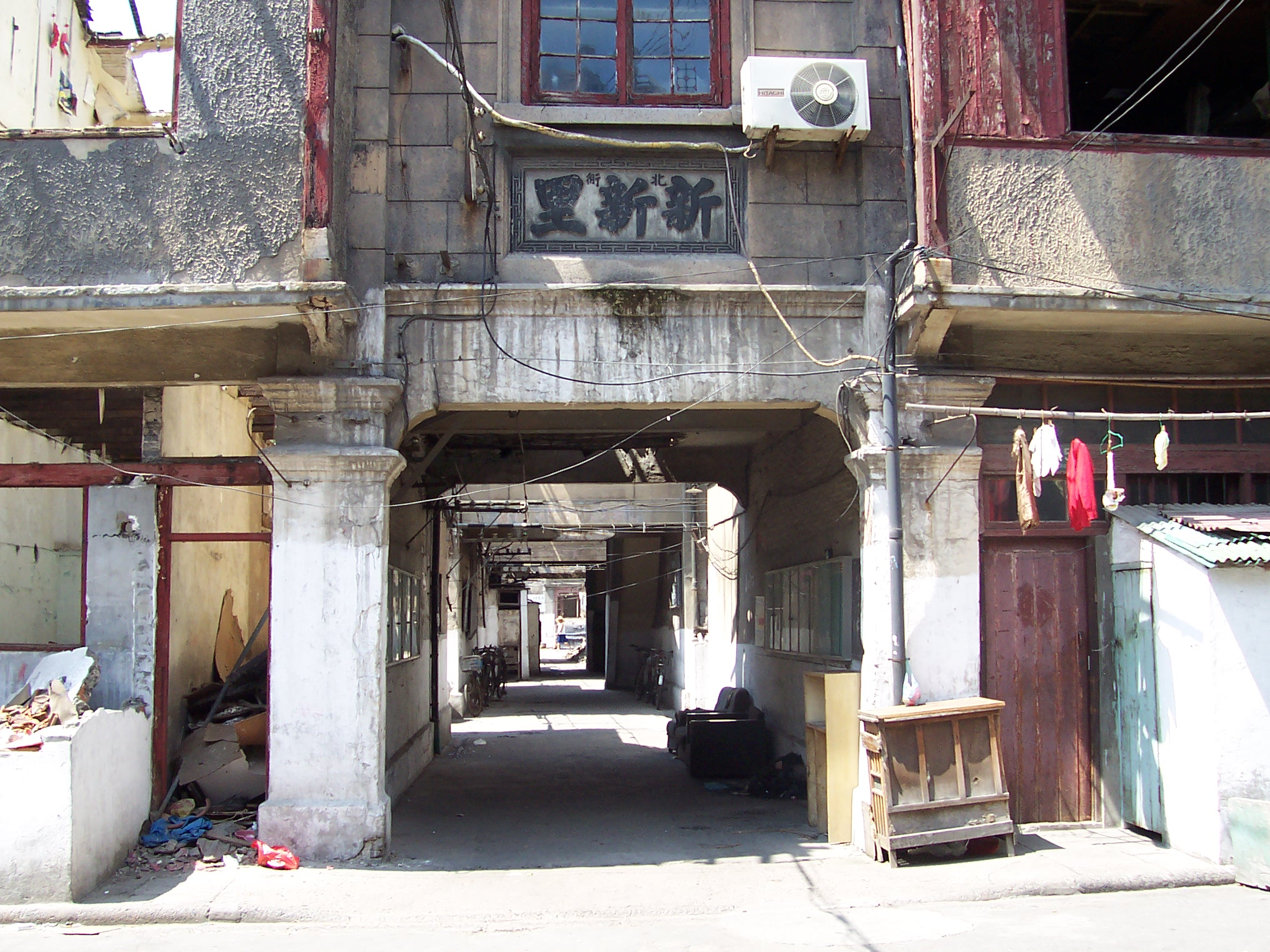
Street entrance to a longtang (Xinxin Li) in Shanghai, just before demolition.

A longtang (Chinese: 弄堂; pinyin: lòngtáng, Shanghainese: /loŋ¹¹ dɑ̃⁴⁴/, Wugniu: lon-daon) is a lane in Shanghai and, by extension, a community centred on a lane or several interconnected lanes. It is sometimes called lilong (里弄); the latter name incorporates the -li suffix often used in the name of residential developments in the late 19th and early 20th centuries. The Shanghai longdang is loosely equivalent to the hutong of Beijing. As with the term hutong, the Shanghai longdang can either refers to the lanes that the houses face onto, or a group of houses connected by the lane.

A large variety of housing styles are called "lilong residences" in Shanghai. Of these, the best known and most characteristic is the shikumen (simplified Chinese: 石库门; traditional Chinese: 石庫門), two- or three-storey terrace houses with a wall and large gate in front of each dwelling. Other types include the more modern "new style lilong" (新式里弄); the simplified "Cantonese style lilong" (广式里弄; 廣式裡弄); the high-end villa-like "garden lilong" (花园里弄; 花園裡弄); and the higher density "apartment lilong" (公寓里弄). Colloquially, they are referred to as "lilong houses" or, as an English translation, "lane houses".

== Governance ==
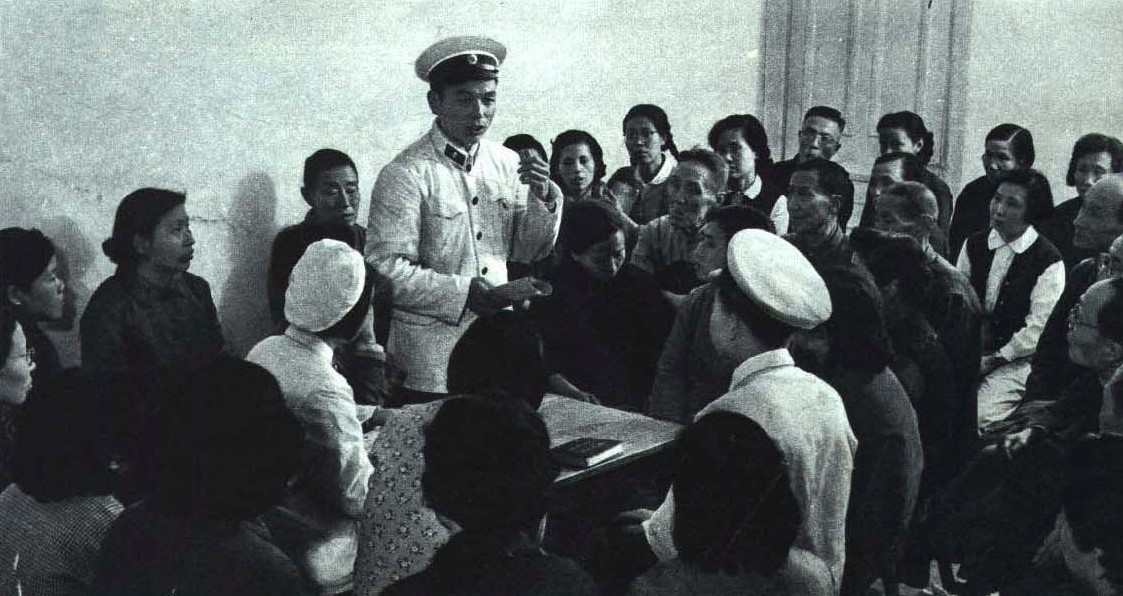
A local policeman in Shanghai conducting a feedback meeting with residents of a lilong in 1964.

In the mid-20th century, after the establishment of Communist rule in Shanghai, a system of "neighbourhood committees" were set up as the lowest level of self-governing administrative organs in urban areas. From 1960 to 1968, in Shanghai these were replaced with "lilong committees" (里弄委员会, often abbreviated to 里委会, liweihui), which had slightly larger jurisdictions than previous neighbourhood committees. Lilong committees acted as liaison between residents and the next level of administrative government (the sub-district), but also had various administrative powers in relation to public security and internal security, education, social welfare, employment, industry, health and mediation. In 1963, the Communist Party's Shanghai committee held a conference on the work of sub-districts, and the Shanghai People's Committee (the municipal government at the time) issued the Regulations for the Work of Lilong Committees in the Shanghai Municipality, which emphasizes that sub-districts and lilongs are "the frontier posts for class struggle, the home front of production, places of living, and important battle positions for the struggle to foster the proletariat and destroy the bourgeoisie".

In 1968, lilong committees were renamed "lilong revolutionary committees" (里弄革命委员会, abbreviated to 里革会, ligehui). In 1978 lilong revolutionary committees were abolished, the smaller neighbourhood committees (or "residents' committees", 居民委员会, abbreviated to 居委会, juweihui) were reinstated. Even today, neighbourhood committees are sometimes colloquially called "lilong committees".

== Use of "-long" in addresses ==
On its own, long (traditional Chinese 衖 or 弄, simplified Chinese 弄) is a Chinese term for "alley" or "lane", which is often left untranslated in Chinese addresses, but may also be translated as "Lane". "Long" is not only used to indicate the addresses of older lilong residential developments: Socialist style block housing developments from the 1950s to 1980s, and modern apartment complexes in Shanghai, are also given a long number as part of their addresses. The address format is typically as seen in an address like "Room 205, No.4, Lane 20, Jing'an Road, Shanghai" (a fictional address), or "Room 205, No. 4, Long 20, Jing'an Road, Shanghai" (上海市静安路二十弄四号二〇五室).

Traditional lilong-style longdangs were typically given names by their developers: these typically ended in long, li, fang or cun, or, very rarely, hutong, a Mongol word. The names of some longdangs are associated with past business associations, for example Jiangyuan Long (Alley of the Sauce and Pickle Shop), although it is far more common to use the name of the developer, the name of the adjoining main road, or some other auspicious name. Although such names are still in common use, they are not part of the official street addresses, which would instead use a long number.

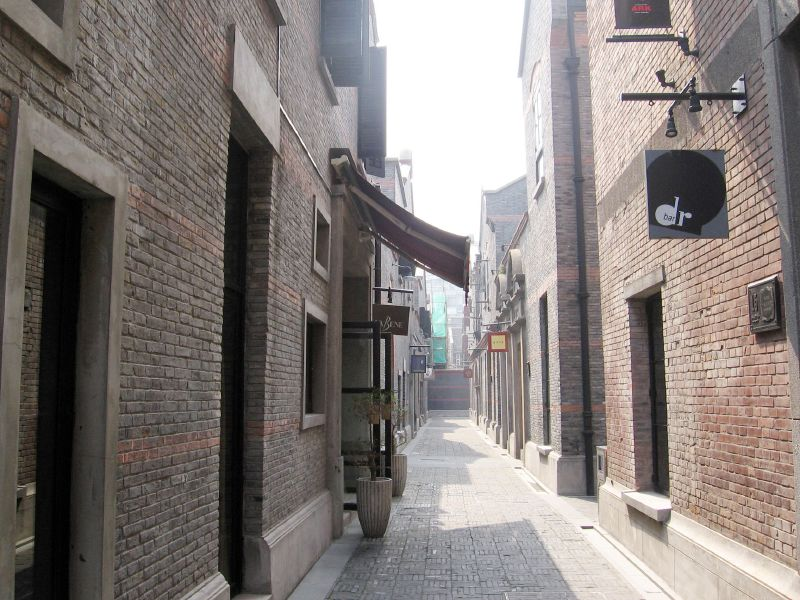
A longtang (弄堂) between shikumen (石库门) townhouses in Shanghai

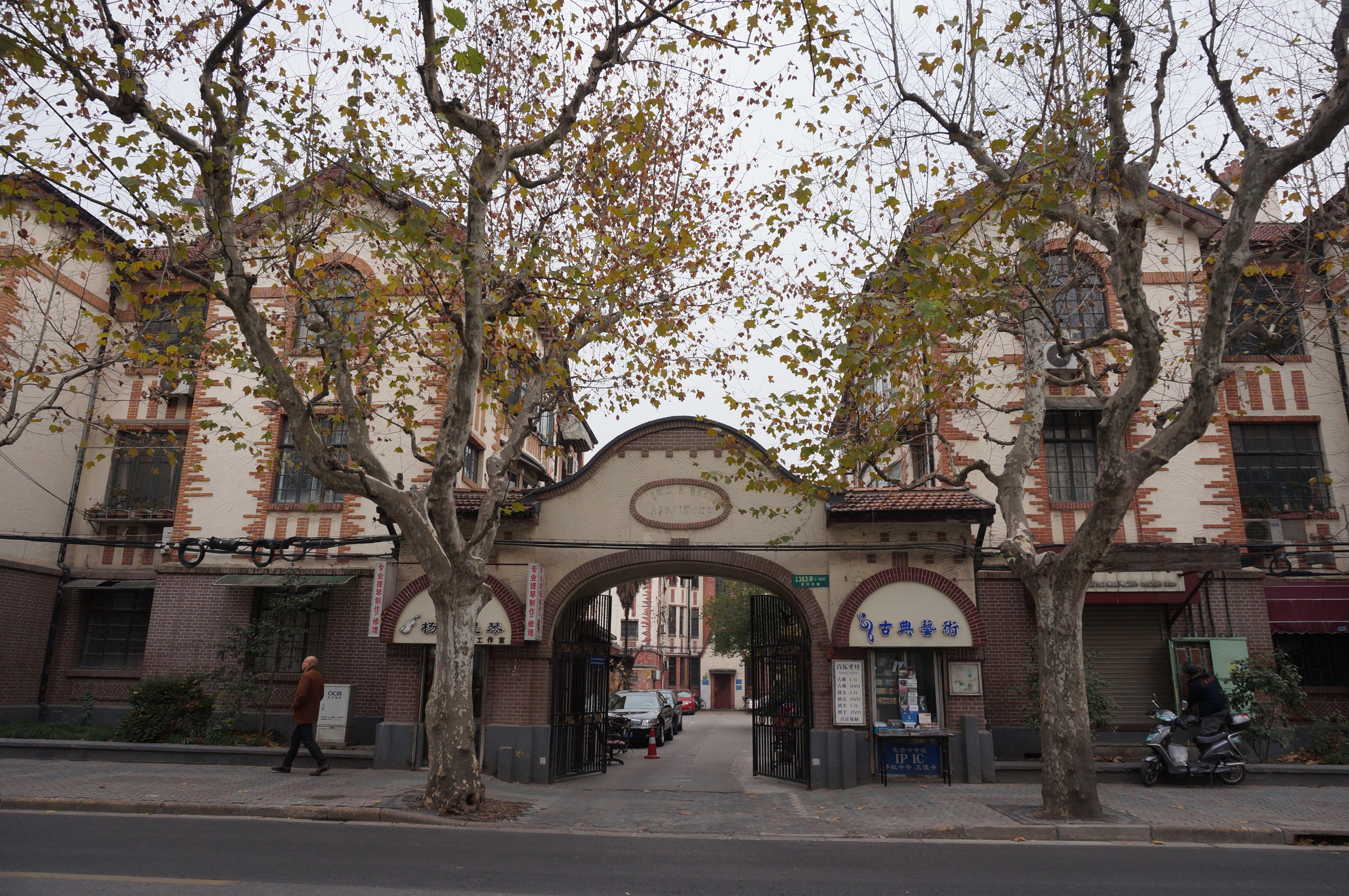
Clements Apartments on Rue Lafayette: a different type of longdang lined with slightly later, more westernized apartment buildings

== Chinese character for "long" ==
In simplified Chinese confusion is sometimes caused between lòng ("alley"; traditional Chinese 衖 or 弄) with the verb nòng ("tamper with"; traditional Chinese 挵) since both have been simplified down to "弄" by removal of the radical (a hand-radical shǒu-bù 扌 in the case of "tamper with", a walk-radical compounded from chì 彳 "step" and chù 亍 "step" on both sides of the phonetic 共 "public" in the case of "alley"). In simplified Chinese the two characters are now written the same way, but the two different pronunciations are still retained in standard Mandarin, where only context indicates whether to read lòng or nòng. However, in Shanghainese the verb is also pronounced /loŋ¹¹³/ (lon).

As to the traditional Chinese character for "long", the form 衖堂 has been in use since at least the end of the 19th century, but even 19th century scholars posited that the "correct" written form of "long" should be 弄.

== See also ==
- Shikumen
