= Fadensonnen =

- Author: Paul Celan
- Translator: Pierre Joris and others
- Language: German
- Publisher: Suhrkamp Verlag
- Publication date: 1968
- English publication date: 2000
- Pages: 121

Fadensonnen is a 1968 German-language poetry collection by Paul Celan. It has been translated by Pierre Joris as Threadsuns, and by others as Twinesuns and Fathomsuns. It was published in English in its entirety in 2000, though parts of it had appeared earlier in volumes of selected poems.

== Reception ==
Pierre Joris's translation was reviewed in Publishers Weekly in 2000: "Threadsuns represents the continuation of a marked turn in Celan's poetics--away from lusher effusions to intensely compressed, increasingly stark investigations of language, history and the poet's own capacities. Because much of this later work is serial in nature, [the translator] Joris's decision to render the books in their entirety is profoundly important, and helps to make them necessary complements to [the earlier translator] Hamburger's selections. While it may not consistently attain the dazzling heights and depths of Celan's finest work in Breathturn and 1963's The No-One's Rose, Threadsuns contains an abundance of brilliant poems and provides ample evidence for the magnitude of Celan's stature in the last century, and in the one to come."

== See also ==
- 1968 in poetry
- Fadensonnen Monument for Josep Moragues by Francesc Abad (in German including a Catalan translation of Celan's poem)
