= Nicole Peyrafitte =

French-born American multidisciplinary artist

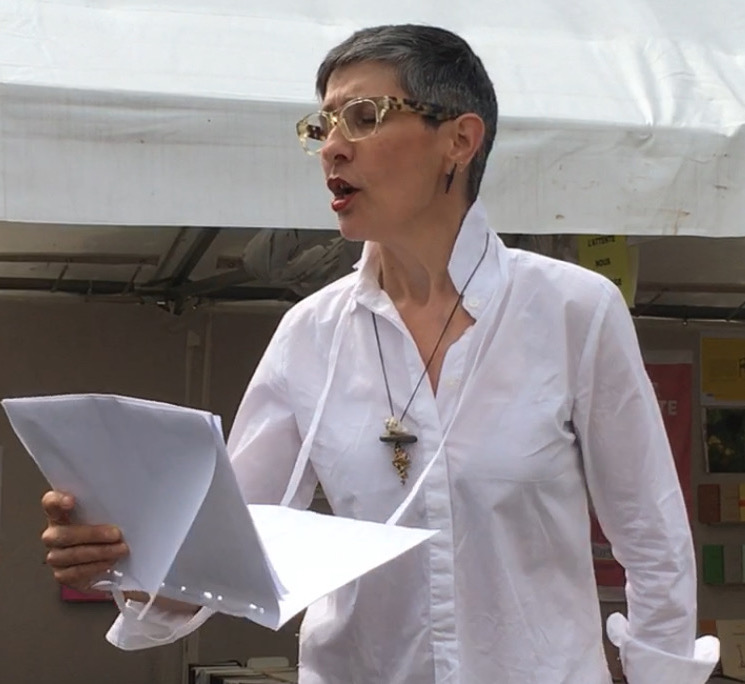
- Peyrafitte in 2018
- Born: June 18, 1960 (age 66); Bagnères-de-Luchon, French Pyrenees, France
- Occupation: Multidisciplinary Artist
- Spouse: Pierre Joris (died 2025)
- Children: Joseph Mastantuono and Miles Joris-Peyrafitte
- Relatives: Jean Peyrafitte (father)
- Writing career
- Language: French, English, Spanish, Occitan
- Genres: Poetry & Performance Arts / Culinary Arts / Visual Arts
- Website: nicolepeyrafitte.com

Nicole Peyrafitte (born June 18, 1960) is a French-born American multidisciplinary artist based as of 2024 in Brooklyn, New York. Her work includes painting, action painting, writing, film, video, music, and cooking, which draws upon her eclectic history and the experiences of shaping identity across two continents (Europe and the United States) and four languages (French, Occitan, Spanish, English). Her performances often include food cooked live and served to the audience.

== Biography ==
=== Early life ===
Nicole Peyrafitte was born in Luchon (French Pyrenees) into the fifth generation of a family of restaurateurs, and received her early cooking training from her grandfather Joseph Peyrafitte, a renowned chef. Later she perfected her skills, interning at several award-winning restaurants in France. Her father was Jean Peyrafitte Fr (1922–2017), who represented Haute-Garonne in the Pyrenees in the French Fifth Republic (1989–1998).

=== Move to United States and early career ===
She moved to the United States in 1987, where she developed her career as a collagist, painter, action-painter, singer, poet and filmmaker.

She lived first in Encinitas, California, where she met her husband, poet Pierre Joris. From 1992 through 2007, for 15 years, she lived in Albany, New York.

=== Career ===
Peyrafitte had only a limited formal art training – two painting courses in the early 1990s with painter and friend Dawn Clements – but has been practicing yoga, bicycling and kayaks, all activities linked to her art.

Peyrafitte's work has been presented nationally and internationally. In New York, she has performed in venues such as The Poetry Project, Zinc Bar, Bowery Poetry Club, Borough of Manhattan Community College, The Vision Festival, Poets House and upstate New York at Bard College, and numerous locations in and around Albany.

Her work has been shown in many other venues around the United States, including San Francisco State University, University of California, San Diego, Berkshire Community College, the Walker Art Institute, The Kelly Writers' House at the University of Pennsylvania, Boise State University, and Naropa University as artist/teacher in residence.

Internationally, her work has been performed or exhibited at Birkbeck College, the University of London, the University of Edinburgh, Université de Bordeaux, Festival les Voix de la Méditerranée, CCA Glasgow, ENSA Limoges, Musée Soulage Rodez, Jardin des Cinq Sens et des Formes Premières, Festival Internacional de las Letras de San Luis Potosí, and Encuentro Internacional de Performance en Durango.

Her visual art works are part of the permanent collections of the Musée Paul Valerie Sète, Musée National d’Histoire et d’Art Luxembourg, Bibliothèque du Luxembourg, Glasgow Women's Library Museum, and the National Literature Centre of Luxembourg.

== Personal life ==
She has lived in Bay Ridge, Brooklyn since 2007 with her husband, poet Pierre Joris. She has two sons: colorist and producer Joseph Mastantuono and director Miles Joris-Peyrafitte.

== Performances ==
=== Karstic Actions ===
Since 2011, Nicole Peyrafitte has been working on an open-ended series of live performances which brings together her interests, preoccupations, and practices. The KARSTIC-Action Paintings explore proprioception (sense of body position) and kinesthesia (sense of body movement) as meeting points between painting, poetry, voice, and improvised music. Following her intuition, Peyrafitte investigates the thin line between her consciousness and unconsciousness, with a strong desire to reveal the immediate soul of that moment. Most often the markings on canvas are done with the feet, either in hand-stand or head-stand; each of these events is unique. Her "Action Paintings" have been showcased at the Galerie Simoncini in Luxembourg, at the Salon Zürcher in New York, and are part of the public collections of Musée Paul Valerie Sète, Musée National d’Histoire et d’Art Luxembourg, Bibliothèque du Luxembourg, Glasgow Women's Library Museum and Centre de National Literature du Luxembourg.

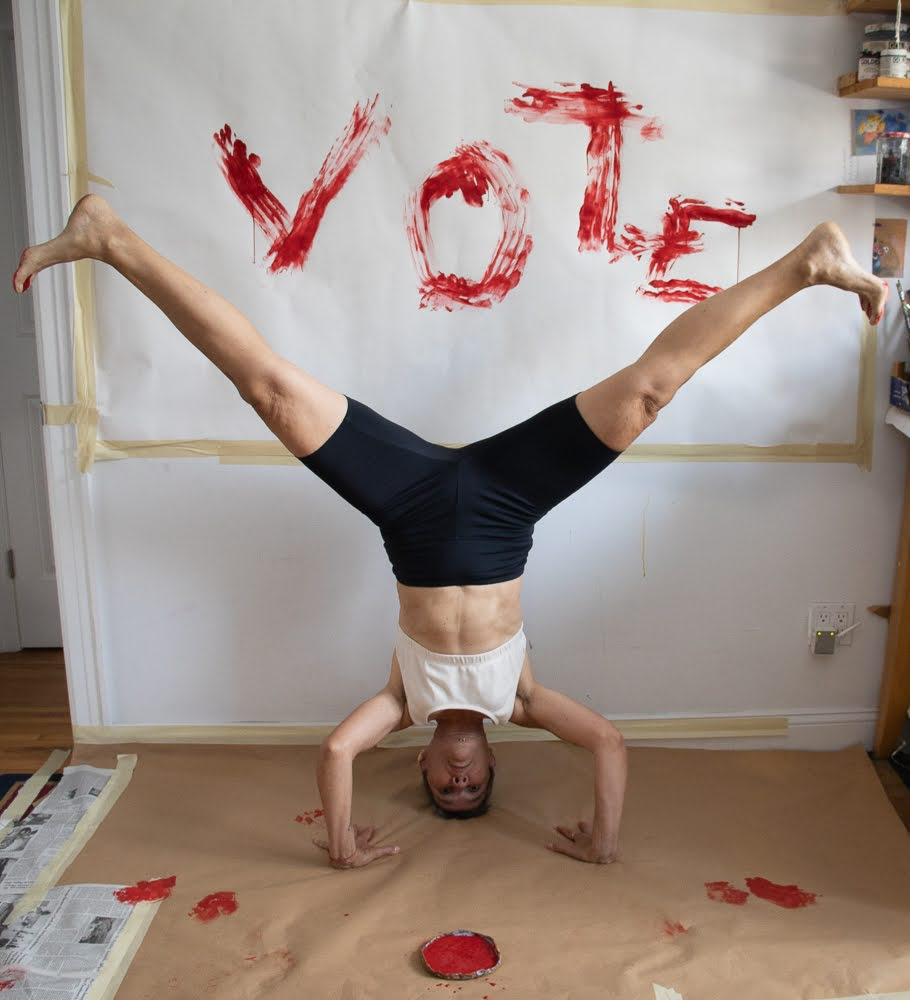
Karstic-Action Vote by Nicole Peyrafitte

=== Selected performances and collaborations ===
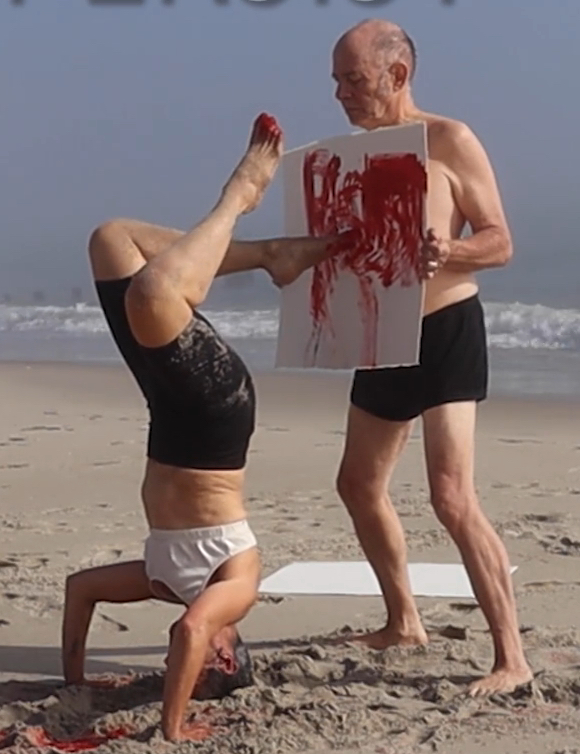
Karstic Shelter by Nicole Peyrafitte and Pierre Joris (Domopoetic Works).

- Domopoetics : Nicole Peyrafitte and her collaborator and husband Pierre Joris show and perform together a series named Domopoetics Work at Galerie Simoncini in Luxembourg. The first Domopoetic exhibition was presented in 2017 under the name "Peyrafitte/Joris Domopoetic Works". In 2021, a second exhibition named "Travaux/Actions Karstiques" took place.
- Trialogues : In 2019 Nicole Peyrafitte, Pierre Joris and Michaël Bisio formed an ongoing collaboration between three protagonists dedicated to their chosen mode of expression: Joris to his nomadic poetry; Peyrafitte to her nourishing, sensual, and campy singing, spoken word, and live painting; and Bisio playing his double bass. It was featured at the Vision Festival XV.
- Collaboration with Betsy Damon for her performance Listen, Respect, Revere.
- Collaboration with Anne Waldman as a special guest for Trickster Feminism
- Collaboration with Anne Waldman in the play Artaud in the Black Lodge

== Exhibitions ==
=== Selected solo exhibitions ===
- "Travaux/Actions Karstiques", Galerie Simoncini, Luxembourg, 2021
- "Peyrafitte/Joris Domopoetic Works", Galerie Simoncini, Luxembourg, 2017
- Orgaginal, solo art show & concert at Maison, Luchon, France, 2016
- The Bi-Continental Chowder at Firlefanz Gallery, Albany, 2007.

=== Selected group exhibitions ===
- "Women and Other Wild Creatures: Matrilineal Tales", a group exhibition of women artists who draw strength from the connection with their non-human nature, healing practices, and visions of human unity with nature. The show was curated by Nina Levent at Sapar Contemporary, New York City, June 3, 2022- August 26, 2022 (Extended).
- Salon Zürcher "The 11 Women of Spirit, Part 1" New-York March 2020, more details here
- “Sun of a Beach 2” group show curated by Denis Brun at OÙ & Galerie Paradis, Marseille, France, 2015
- Waltzing in Quicksand: Poets in Collage, curated by Bruce Weber at A Gathering of the Tribes, 2010
- The Mohawk–Hudson Regional Invitational at The Albany Center Gallery

== Films and videos ==
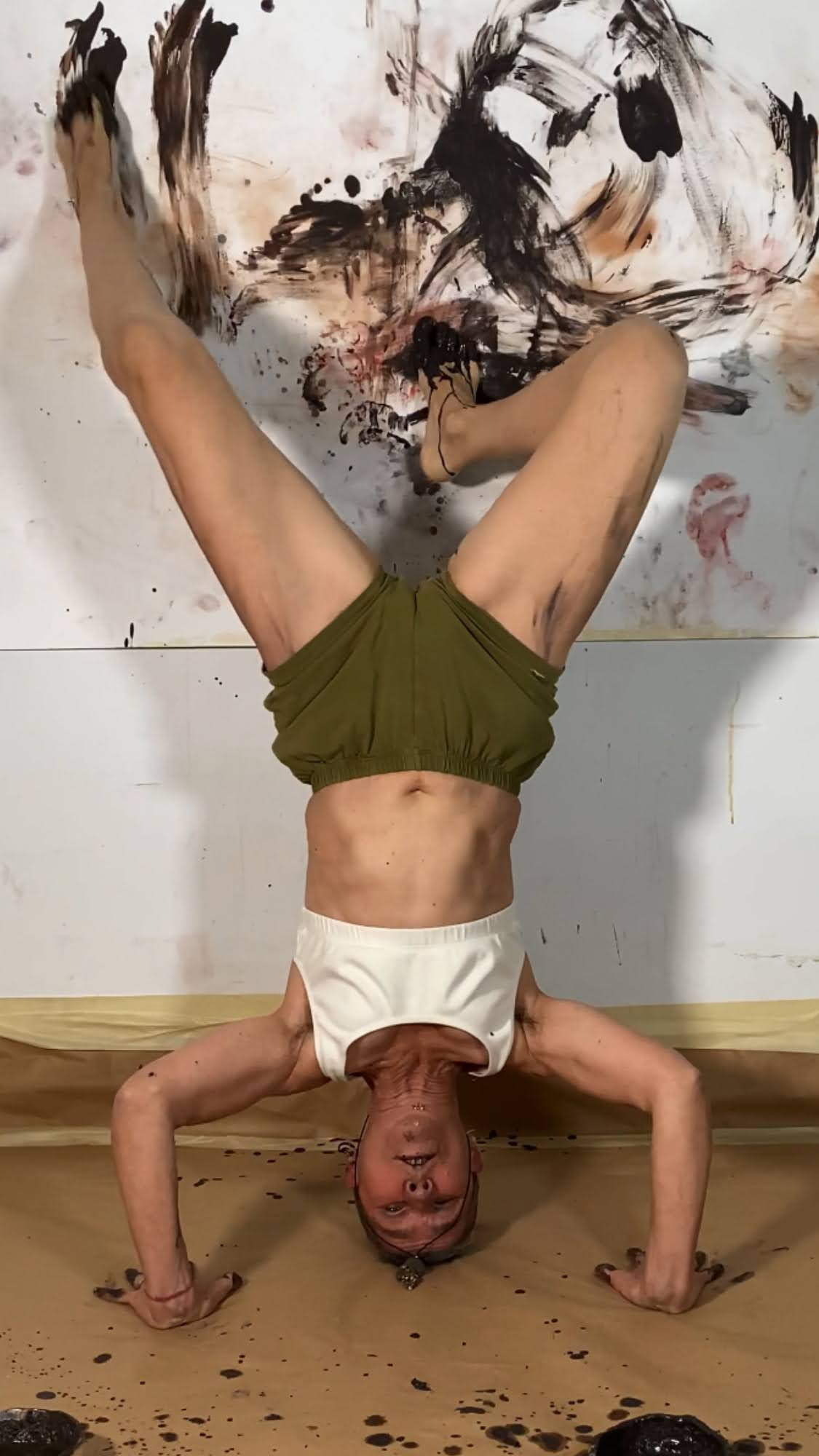
Be Like Water : a Karstic -Action live streamed for The Poetry Project 48th Annual Marathon on January 1st 2022

- "Be Like Water" Karstic Action
- "Karstic Action : I de-suffice myself in confinement" for burnt video art and experimental film festival, 2020
- Paul Celan by Pierre Joris: A Reading
- Robert Kelly: A Celebration
- Things Fall Where They Lie (2018). Things Fall Where They Lie premiered at Anthology Film Archive in September 2020.
- Pierre Joris Flash Interviews #1 to #6 & Colchique (2016-2017)
- Basil King: Mirage, co-directed with Miles Joris-Peyrafitte on painter, poet & Black Mountain student Basil King (2012).
- You Lie & Anhalter Bahnhof for “Celan/Joris 50 years of translation” (2012)

== Publications ==
=== Books and chapbooks ===
- Connection en Mille-Feuille (RedfoxPress, 2022)
- Carnet 2 (RedfoxPress Ireland, 2018)
- Landsc0pes (Plaine Page, 2018)
- Book of U Poems / Le livre des Cormorans, poems by Pierre Joris and drawings by Nicole Peyrafitte (Galerie Simoncini Editions, 2017)
- Liminal Line (Editions les Venterniers, 2016)
- Bi-Valve: Vulvic Space / Vulvic Knowledge (Stockport Flats, 2013 & Plaine Page, 2016)
- Carnet (RedfoxPress Ireland, 2014)
- Ride the Line / The Calendar / Hommage à la Vénus de Lespugue, 3 chapbooks by Ta’wil Press (1997)

=== Magazine and anthologies publications ===
- Periodico de Poesia- Universidad Nacional Autónoma de México (Jan 2021)
- The A-LINE Journal (Nov 2020)
- Time of Poet Republic (2020)
- Le Chant de la Sirène (2020)
- Voice of Trees (2020)
- World Literature Today 2019
- Conversation in the Pyrenees 2019
- Junction Box 2019
- The Café Review 2019
- LiveMag! #15 2018
- Teste 32 2018
- Voix Vives de La Méditerranée en Méditerranée 2018
- Peinture & Poesie Musée Paul Valéry 2018
- Requiem for Gaza 2018
- Solidarity Texts —2017
- Revue GPS — 2016
- Supplement — 2016 ( Kelly Writers House)
- Folder Silhouette — 2015
- Mary Reed and ses Acolytes – Invece No. 1 2013
- Theory, A Sunday 2013
- Bombay Gin #39.2 2013 —Naropa University, Boulder, Colorado
- Aufgabe 2013 #12 Extract of Bi-Valve —Litmus Press, NYC
- Anthologie des Voix Vives: Festival de Poésie de Sète France 2013
- Jacket2 Jerome Rothenberg's: Poem & poetics blog 2013 — Extract of Bi-Valve in
- Some Stories are True That Never Happened, an anthology by Erika Lutzner 2012
- Emergency INDEX 2011 - Ugly Duckling Presse
- Pierre Joris: Cartographies of the In-Between ed. Peter Cockelberg - Litteraria Pragensia
- The Portable Boog Reader 3, an instant anthology of New York City poetry 2010;
- Invisible Culture: An electronic Journal for Visual Culture. Rochester University;
- Anthology des Voix de la Méditerranée Lodève 2008
- Revue du Comminges 2008: Augustus Saint-Gaudens: Grand maître de la sculpture américaine, fils de Bernard Saint-Gaudens né à Aspet en 1816 Effing Magazine #2, 2004
- The Healing Muse Journal of Literary & Visual Arts -Center for Bioethics & Humanities State University of New York Footballs No7 Art action / Montagne Froide — France

=== Translations ===
Occitan to English

- Bernat Manciet, Ode to James Dean, Mindmade Books, 2014
- Marcella Delpastre & Bernat Manciet selections for Jacket 2, 2014

French to English

- Cesar Vallejo, La Mort, co-translated with Pierre Joris, Wesleyan University Press, 2015
- Nicole Brossard, "Wildly", in Theory, A Sunday, Belladonna, 2013
- Matoub Lounes, "Kenza" & Mustapha Benfodil, "I Conned Myself on a Levantine Day" in The University of California Book of North African Literature, edited by Pierre Joris & Habib Tengour, UCP, 2012

English to French

- Pierre Joris, The Book of U / Le livre des Cormorans, Editions Galerie Simoncini, 2017
- Jerome Rothenberg/Ian Tyson: Delight/Délices et autre Gematria Ottezec Press, 1997
- George Quasha and Charles Stein, Gary Hill: HanD HearD/Liminal Objects, Station Hill Press of Barrytown, 1997

== Discography ==
- Bi-Valve (Plaine Page, 2015)
- Whisk! Don't Churn! with Michael Bisio (Ta'wil Productions, 2009)
- Sax Soup Poetry & Voice w/ Pierre Joris & Joe Giardullo (Sanctuary for Independent Media Productions, 2007)
- The Bi-Continental Chowder (Ta'wil Productions, 2006)

== Awards and honors ==
- Best Performance Art Venue: Times Union · Best of 2006 · The top choices in the capital region Nicole Peyrafitte's Experimental Cabaret at Tess’ Lark Tavern.
- Best Performance Artist: Times Union · Best of 2005 · The top choices in the capital region.

== Reviews ==
Concerning her work, poet/performer Anne Waldman has written: "Nicole Peyrafitte is a brilliant and most original performer. Her vocalizations, her songs, her gestures are provocative: both stunningly beautiful and powerfully unnerving at times. She is the chthonic goddess come to tempt you, scare you, transform you. She is in the poetic lineage of Greek tragedy, Café Voltaire antics, of dada and surrealist play but with a post-modern, hip sensibility. I am transfixed when she's on stage." In addition Greg Haymes reviewed "The Bi-Continental Chowder".
