= LuckyChap Entertainment =

British-American production company

LuckyChap Entertainment Limited
- Logo used since 2023
- Type: Private
- Industry: Motion pictures, Entertainment
- Founded: 2014; 12 years ago
- Founders: Margot Robbie; Tom Ackerley; Josey McNamara; Sophia Kerr
- Headquarters: Los Angeles, California, U.S. Bromsgrove, Worcestershire, England
- Key people: Margot Robbie; Tom Ackerley; Josey McNamara
- Divisions: LuckyChap UK Ventures; LuckyChap Australia
- Website: www.luckychap.co.uk

LuckyChap Entertainment Limited is a production company based in Los Angeles and Bromsgrove, founded in 2014 by Margot Robbie, Tom Ackerley, Josey McNamara and Sophia Kerr. The company describes their focal point as female-focused film and television productions.

LuckyChap Entertainment has produced films and television series including I, Tonya (2017), the Hulu TV series Dollface (2019), Birds of Prey, Promising Young Woman (both 2020), the Netflix miniseries Maid (2021), Barbie and Saltburn (both 2023).

As of 2024, works produced by the company have received 25 Academy Award and 18 BAFTA nominations. In 2018, its first release I, Tonya, won the Academy Award for Best Supporting Actress. Three years later, Promising Young Woman won the Academy Award for Best Original Screenplay and the BAFTAs for Best Original Screenplay and Outstanding British Film. In 2024, Barbie won the Academy Award for Best Original Song.

== Formation ==
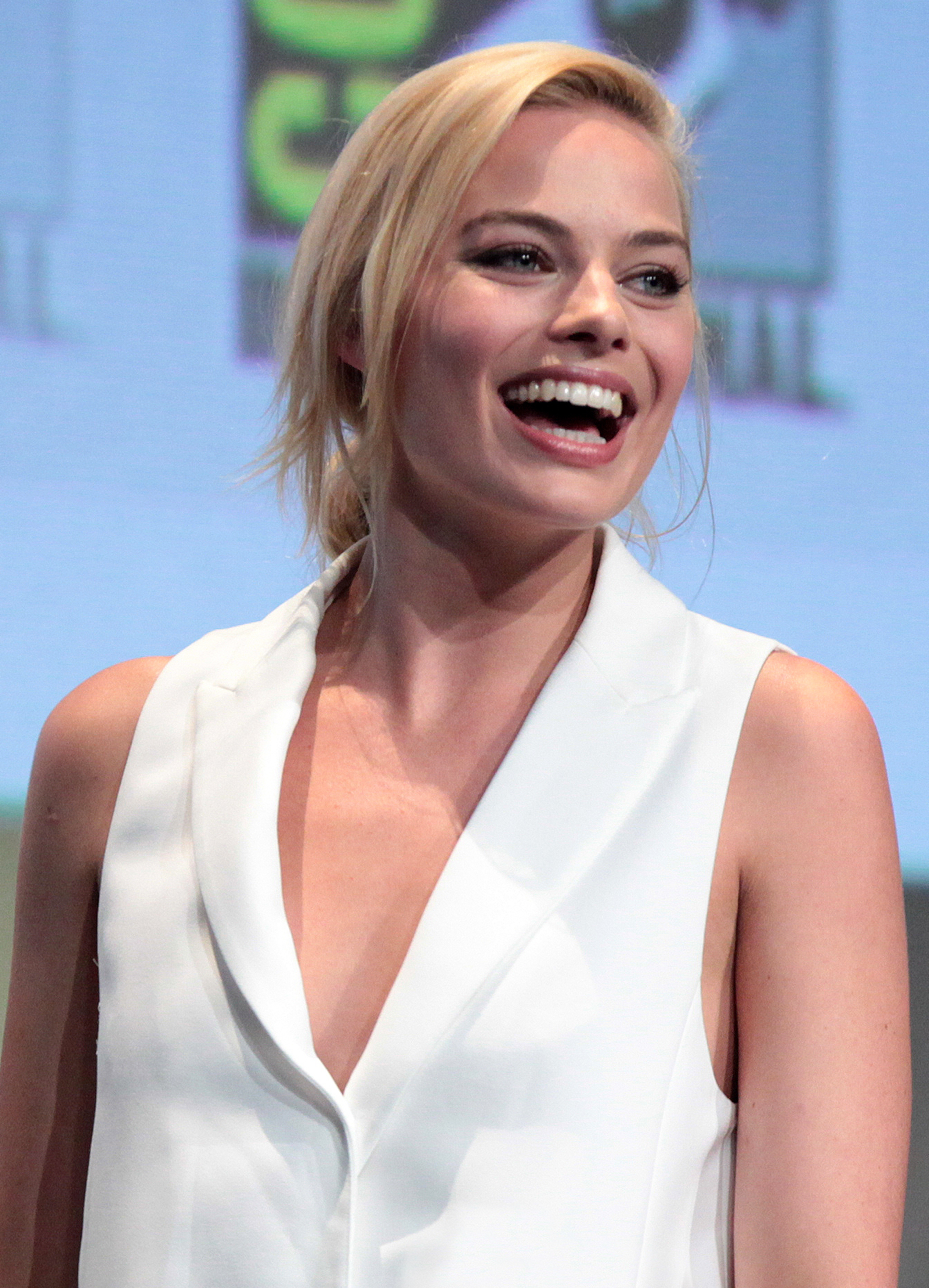
Co founder of LuckyChap Entertainment, Australian actress Margot Robbie.

The company was established by Margot Robbie, Tom Ackerley, Sophia Kerr and Josey McNamara. An Australian actress, Robbie is primarily known as a film star, playing major roles in Wolf of Wall Street, Suicide Squad and The Legend of Tarzan. In 2018, she discussed that she previously had an interest in obtaining creative control from behind the camera and how forming LuckyChap Entertainment gave her the ability to pursue this.

Robbie and Kerr grew up together on the Gold Coast in Queensland, Australia. The British pair McNamara and Ackerley worked together for years as assistant directors. Robbie and Ackerley met in 2013 on the set of the 2015 film Suite Française; they began dating in 2014 and married in 2016. After getting drunk together at the London premiere of The Wolf of Wall Street, the four co-founders decided to move into a house together in Clapham, London. There, they conceived the idea of starting a production company. The name "LuckyChap" relates to Charlie Chaplin, though Robbie said that none of them could remember its exact meaning. Brett Hedblom serves as LuckyChap's Vice President of television.

== Productions ==
Logo used from 2014 to 2023.

In 2017, LuckyChap Entertainment released their first major motion picture production I, Tonya, based on the life of American competitive ice skater Tonya Harding, played by Robbie. It had a budget of $11 million and was their first theatrical release. I, Tonya earned an Academy Award for Allison Janney as Best Supporting Actress, a BAFTA and a Golden Globe Award, along with several nominations. L. Rose of The Hollywood Reporter described the movie's success as a demonstration of LuckyChap Entertainment's "instant credibility".

In 2018, LuckyChap released their next film Terminal, in partnership with Beagle Pug Films and Highland Film Group. The neo-noir thriller film, written and directed by Vaughn Stein and starring Margot Robbie, was filmed and produced prior to I, Tonya. It was unsuccessful at the box offices, grossing $843,970 in comparison to I, Tonya's gross of $53,939,297.

In 2019, the company, along with Automatik Entertainment and Paramount Pictures, premiered Dreamland, a 1930s-set action drama, which was filmed in 2017. Robbie stars as an outlaw on the run, with a teenage boy as a sidekick. Also in 2019, the company took part in Film Victoria's Placement Program, this program involved a young female producer from Film Victoria undertaking a six-month placement at LuckyChap.

Subsequently, LuckyChap began involvement in television production. Brett Hedlom became Vice President of television. They sold the comedy series Dollface to Hulu in 2018, and then began production and released the show in 2019. The show is also produced by ABC Signature Studios and Clubhouse Pictures, and stars Kat Dennings—a recently single young woman who comes to terms with her imagination and old friendships.

Throughout 2019, the company also worked in the production of Birds of Prey (And the Fantabulous Emancipation of One Harley Quinn), which premiered in early 2020. Also produced by Clubhouse Pictures and Warner Bros and directed by Cathy Yan, it is the eighth installment in the DC Extended Universe, as a spin-off of Suicide Squad (2016). It focuses on the super villain DC Comics character Harley Quinn who, after being dumped by the Joker, forms an all-female superhero team. The film grossed over $200 million worldwide, becoming LuckyChap's most commercially successful release at the time.

Later on in 2020, the company released the female revenge film Promising Young Woman, which was Emerald Fennell's first directorial feature. Also produced by FilmNation Entertainment and Focus Features, this black comedy film stars Carey Mulligan in her attempt to get revenge for the rape and consequent suicide of a female friend. This film earned an Academy Award, a BAFTA for Best Original Screenplay and another BAFTA for Outstanding British Film of the Year.

LuckyChap Entertainment had a first-look deal with Warner Bros. Pictures and Warner Bros. Television to develop and produce films and television series. In this deal they partnered with Mattel Films, the new theatrical film division of Mattel, and Warner Bros Pictures, to co-produce Barbie (2023), in which Robbie starred as Barbie. The film's initial planned 2017 release was repeatedly delayed. It was released on 21 July 2023, simultaneously with Oppenheimer, leading to the "Barbenheimer" phenomenon. Barbie grossed over US$1.4 billion worldwide, becoming the highest-grossing film of 2023 and LuckyChap's most successful production to date.

=== Focus ===
LuckyChap has described itself as a company that aims to promote female stories from female storytellers, stating that they are filling a gap caused by gender inequality in the film industry, particularly in terms of writers and directors.

In 2019, LuckyChap partnered with Christina Hodson, the writer of action films including Birds of Prey (2020) and Bumblebee (2018), to form the 'Lucky Exports Pitch Program' (LEPP). The month-long program consisted of six female writers, including four women of color, in a writers' room. The writers workshopped ideas for action film projects.

As well as ensuring their crews are primarily female, LuckyChap have described that they aim to work on female-focused storylines. LuckyChap executive Margot Robbie said that she always gravitated towards playing male character roles, as she felt their storylines were better. A. Setianto and M. Win described Birds of Prey as intricately exploring the issues women face in trying to gain, independence. while N. Curtis and V. Cardo described Quinn as a female character who has control over her own body and sexuality.

=== Location ===
The initial headquarters consisted of a small office space located on the Warner Bros lot in Los Angeles. After outgrowing their initial office space, LuckyChap decided to move into a bigger office in Downtown Los Angeles, where they designed an "open, collaborative environment", according to Architectural Digest. LuckyChap Entertainment said of the construction that they made an effort to keep a feminine aesthetic in the office, with features like their custom-made neon LuckyChap Entertainment sign.

=== Future ===
The company also sold their television project Shattered Glass to NBC under the Warner Bros Deal. Robbie and Hedblom decided to work with the ABC, Tracey Robertson and Nathan Mayfield from the Australian production company Hoodlum, ABC Studios International, and Robbie's agent Aran Michael from Aran Michael Management, on a 10-part series Shakespeare Now. The series is to be a modern adaptation of Shakespeare, told from female perspectives and led by an all-female production team. In December 2020, the company signed a first look deal with Amazon Studios for TV projects. The company is co-producing the dramedy Netflix series Maid (2021), inspired by Stephanie Land's memoir Maid: Hard Work, Low Pay, and a Mother's Will to Survive. It is also produced by Molly Smith Metzler, John Wells Productions and Warner Bros Television. LuckyChap Entertainment and Scott Free Productions are co-producing a film based on the Disney attraction Big Thunder Mountain Railroad. The script is being written by Michele and Kieran Mulroney, and it will be directed by Bert and Bertie. The company is also producing the Christmas comedy Naughty, which will be directed by Olivia Wilde. In March 2024, it was announced that the company and Vertigo Entertainment would produce a film based on the life simulation game The Sims.

== Films ==
Key
†	Denotes works that have not yet been released

Films produced by LuckyChap Entertainment
Year	Title	Director	Gross
2017	I, Tonya	Craig Gillespie	$53.9 million
2018	Terminal	Vaughn Stein	$843,970
2019	Dreamland	Miles Joris-Peyrafitte	$320,814
2020	Birds of Prey	Cathy Yan	$205.4 million
2020	Promising Young Woman	Emerald Fennell	$18.8 million
2021	The Humming of the Beast	Francisca Alegría	—N/a
2023	Boston Strangler	Matt Ruskin	—N/a
2023	Barbie	Greta Gerwig	$1.446 billion
2023	Saltburn	Emerald Fennell	$21.1 million
2024	My Old Ass	Megan Park	$5.7 million
2025	Borderline	Jimmy Warden	$284,704
2026	Wuthering Heights	Emerald Fennell	$242 million
2027	Ocean's Eleven prequel	Bradley Cooper	TBA
2027	Naughty	Olivia Wilde	TBA
2027	Nasty	Mary Bronstein	TBA
TBA	Attack of the 50 Foot Woman	Tim Burton	TBA
TBA	Avengelyne	Olivia Wilde	TBA
TBA	Bad Bridgets	Rich Peppiatt	TBA
TBA	Big Thunder Mountain Railroad	Bert and Bertie	TBA
TBA	Everybody Wants to Fuck Me	Jonathan Schey	TBA
TBA	Hollow	Lindsey Anderson Beer	TBA
TBA	Monopoly	TBA	TBA
TBA	My Year of Rest and Relaxation	TBA	TBA
TBA	The Sims	Kate Herron	TBA
TBA	Stagtown	Benjamin Brewer	TBA
TBA	Tank Girl	Miles Joris-Peyrafitte	TBA
TBA	Three Times a Lady	Rebecca Hall	TBA
TBA	Untitled body swap comedy film	Max Barbakow	TBA
TBA	Whoever You Are, Honey	TBA	TBA

== Television ==
Television shows produced by LuckyChap Entertainment
Year	Title	Network
2019–2022	Dollface	Hulu
2021	Maid	Netflix
2022	Mike	Hulu
2025	Sirens	Netflix
2026	Sterling Point	Amazon Prime Video
TBA	Life Is Strange	Amazon Prime Video
TBA	Sex Criminals	Amazon Prime Video

== Awards and nominations ==
Award	Year	Category	Work		Result
Award	Year	Category	Project	Recipient	Result
Academy Awards	2018	Best Actress	I, Tonya	Margot Robbie	Nominated
Academy Awards	2018	Best Supporting Actress	I, Tonya	Allison Janney	Won
Academy Awards	2018	Best Film Editing	I, Tonya	Tatiana S. Riegel	Nominated
Academy Awards	2021	Best Picture	Promising Young Woman	Ben Browning, Ashley Fox, Emerald Fennell, and Josey McNamara	Nominated
Academy Awards	2021	Best Director	Promising Young Woman	Emerald Fennell	Nominated
Academy Awards	2021	Best Actress	Promising Young Woman	Carey Mulligan	Nominated
Academy Awards	2021	Best Original Screenplay	Promising Young Woman	Emerald Fennell	Won
Academy Awards	2021	Best Film Editing	Promising Young Woman	Frédéric Thoraval	Nominated
Academy Awards	2024	Best Picture	Barbie	David Heyman, Margot Robbie, Tom Ackerley, and Robbie Brenner	Nominated
Academy Awards	2024	Best Supporting Actor	Barbie	Ryan Gosling	Nominated
Academy Awards	2024	Best Supporting Actress	Barbie	America Ferrera	Nominated
Academy Awards	2024	Best Adapted Screenplay	Barbie	Greta Gerwig and Noah Baumbach	Nominated
Academy Awards	2024	Best Costume Design	Barbie	Jacqueline Durran	Nominated
Academy Awards	2024	Best Original Song	"I'm Just Ken"	Mark Ronson and Andrew Wyatt	Nominated
Academy Awards	2024	Best Original Song	"What Was I Made For?"	Billie Eilish and Finneas O'Connell	Won
Academy Awards	2024	Best Production Design	Barbie	Sarah Greenwood and Katie Spencer	Nominated
British Academy Film Awards	2018	Best Actress in a Supporting Role	I, Tonya	Allison Janney	Won
British Academy Film Awards	2021	Outstanding British Film	Promising Young Woman	Ben Browning, Emerald Fennell, Ashley Fox, Josey McNamara	Won
British Academy Film Awards	2021	Best Original Screenplay	Promising Young Woman	Emerald Fennell	Won
Golden Globe Awards	2018	Best Supporting Actress – Motion Picture	I, Tonya	Allison Janney	Won
Primetime Emmy Awards	2022	Outstanding Lead Actress in a Limited or Anthology Series or Movie	Maid	Margaret Qualley	Nominated
Primetime Emmy Awards	2022	Outstanding Directing for a Limited or Anthology Series or Movie	Maid	John Wells	Nominated
Primetime Emmy Awards	2022	Outstanding Writing for a Limited or Anthology Series or Movie	Maid	Molly Smith Metzler	Nominated
