= Ni ka =

ni_ka
- Born: Shinagawa, Tokyo, Japan
- Education: Chuo University
- Occupations: Poet and artist
- Years active: 2011–present
- Known for: Monitor poetry and Augmented Reality poetry

ni_ka (にか, Nika) (born in Tokyo, Japan) is a Japanese poet and new media artist. She gained prominence in the 2010s for inventing new kinds of poetry using digital technology: monitor poetry (monita-shi), designed for computer screens and making use of thousands of emoji, animated GIFs, and other forms of computer graphics, and AR Poetry (AR-shi), made using augmented reality.

== Biography ==
ni_ka was born in Shinagawa, Tokyo. She graduated from Edogawa Gakuen Toride Junior & Senior High School, having also studied abroad at Cabra Dominican College in Adelaide, South Australia, and received a bachelor's degree from the Chuo University Faculty of Law.

== Work ==
In early 2011, ni_ka started to experiment with creating poetic works in augmented reality, coining the term "AR poetry" (AR-shi) to describe them. She created them using the AR smartphone app Sekai Camera, in operation from 2009 until the service was terminated in 2014. Shortly afterwards, the 2011 Tōhoku earthquake and tsunami struck, severely affecting her family; she shifted to creating AR poems about the disaster.

In her 2012 "Manifesto on Updating Japanese Concrete Poetry," ni_ka continued to extend her redefinition of concrete poetry to include the arrangement of the objects on the ceremonial platform at the one-year memorial service for the 2011 Tōhoku earthquake and tsunami. This inventor and practitioner "monitor poetry" and "AR poetry" states: unless I discover words, somehow absorb, collect and aggregate within wata-shi [a first person pronoun of her own invention that combines watashi, meaning "I" or "me," with shi, "poem" or "poetry"] all that hangs in suspension around words, and attend these words as they emerge, this would constitute not poetry but death." In this point of view, "words" would entail a new arrangement of things, which may express the disorderly relationship between the living and the dead. Poetry then becomes an endeavor to glean this relationship from the world, and rearranging it in the same world in the form of a condensed logic (or as its vehicle).

Dommune Official Guide Book 2 selected her AR poetry as one of one hundred resources for the 2012 Japanese Cultural Energy. 2011 Tōhoku earthquake and tsunami inspired her to create a new form of mourning and a trans-generic form of living in which the boundary between language and image is deconstructed. In October 2013 ni_ka attended "Shibu-karu-sai" (Shibuya Cultural Festival), celebrating the 40th anniversary of Shibuya Seibu Department Store's PARCO Museum. In October 2014 ni_ka collaborated with an idol unit "Kamen-Joshi" (Masque Girls) at the exhibition After 3.11 Tokyo Girl in Ginza.

AR poetry is one of the original works of her that we could see a lot of pictures such as Hello Kitty, the roses, and morning words. They come from Paul Celan, "Die Niemandsrose", and express the mourning of 3.11, the date of the 2011 Tōhoku earthquake and tsunami. In these works, an AR rose appears on the top of the Tokyo Tower. In Sekai Camera apprication, touching float poetry words allows the toucher to write a reply (Relational Art).

ni_ka's works are a kind of conceptual art which showed dynamic activity in Smartphone and monitor, but the concept is that come from the movement of Japanese concrete poetry called VOU, ASA.

Work
This is an AR poetry picture. "過透明な" means "Overtransparent", "無の壮麗" means "splendid of nothing".

She also created "monitor poetry". Monitor poetry is used in emoji and decomoji, influenced by Seiichi Niikuni, Katsue Kitasono, Gozo Yoshimasu and Stéphane Mallarmé. In January 2015, her work named "WEB h a l l e l u j a h 「a」－blood／arch(WEB は れ る や 「あ」－血／アーチ)" translated by Andrew Campana, was uploaded on the web magazine CURA.
