= Jean Peyrafitte =

Jean Peyrafitte (born 15 June 1922 in Bagnères-de-Luchon and died 11 November 2017 in Montauban-de-Luchon) was a French chef and politician, who served as a Senator from the department of Haute-Garonne as a Socialist in the Fifth French Republic.

== Biography ==
Payrefitte was born on 15 June 1922 in Bagnères-de-Luchon, a spa town in the Pyrénées that is commonly known as Luchon. He studied in Toulouse. He was employed for many years at his family's restaurant in Luchon, and became the proprietor in 1980. He was also a journalist for La Dépêche du Midi from 1961 to 1974, and a correspondent for the AFP from 1962 to 1974.

He was active in his professional associations and local tourist organizations, including as vice president of the canton's Chambre syndicale de l'industrie hôtelière de la Haute-Garonne (1970–1982), president of the commune's restaurant association (1969–1980), and served many years on the board of the Pyrenees regional Confédération pyrénéenne touristique.

He served in local government in the 1970s to 1990s in the Haute-Garonne council, representing at large his town of Bagnères-de-Luchon (1977–1992) and was regional councilor for the Midi-Pyrénées (1980–1986). He was elected mayor of his home town (1974–1995).

In the Senate election of 28 September 1980, as a candidate of the Socialist Party, he was elected to a nine-year term. He was re-elected to a second nine-year term on 24 September 1989.

In the senate, he supported rural development, the European Union, social security, and tourism development.

He died on 11 November 2017, at the age of 95, and was named a chevalier de la Légion d'honneur.

== Political offices held ==
=== Local ===
- 1977 – 1992 : Three terms as a canton-wide (county council member at large) of the commune and spa town of Bagnères-de-Luchon, Haute-Garonne.
- 1974 – 1995 : 21 years as Mayor of Bagnères-de-Luchon.

=== Parliamentary terms ===
- 28 September 1980 to 24 September 1989 : Senator from Haute-Garonne
- 24 September 1989 to 30 September 1998 : Senator from Haute-Garonne

== Personal life ==
Peyrafitte was the father of Nicole Peyrafitte, the multimedia performance artist and writer, and father-in-law of Pierre Joris, the poet, who both have lived and worked primarily in the United States.
