= Naughty (2027 film) =

Upcoming film by Olivia Wilde

- Directed by: Olivia Wilde
- Written by: Jimmy Warden
- Produced by: Margot Robbie; Tom Ackerley; Josey McNamara; Olivia Wilde; Jimmy Warden
- Starring: Jennifer Aniston; Peter Dinklage; Chase Sui Wonders; Regina Hall; Ike Barinholtz; Samara Weaving; Kate Berlant; John Early; Kate O'Flynn; Jamie Demetriou
- Cinematography: John Mathieson
- Production company: LuckyChap Entertainment
- Distributed by: Universal Pictures
- Release date: November 5, 2027
- Country: United States
- Language: English

Naughty is an upcoming American Christmas comedy film directed by Olivia Wilde and written by Jimmy Warden. The film stars Jennifer Aniston, Peter Dinklage, Chase Sui Wonders, Regina Hall, Ike Barinholtz, Samara Weaving, Kate Berlant, John Early, Kate O'Flynn, and Jamie Demetriou and will be produced by Margot Robbie and Tom Ackerley's LuckyChap Entertainment banner.

Naughty is set for release by Universal Pictures on November 5, 2027.

== Premise ==
Single mom Mallory must find and convince Santa Claus to testify at her divorce hearing to gain custody from her ex.

== Cast ==
- Jennifer Aniston as Mallory
- Peter Dinklage as Santa Claus
- Chase Sui Wonders as Mallory's friend
- Regina Hall as Mallory's friend
- Ike Barinholtz as Mallory's ex-husband
- Samara Weaving as the ex-husband's mistress
- Kate Berlant
- John Early
- Kate O'Flynn
- Jamie Demetriou
- Dexter Sol Ansell

== Production ==
In December 2023, it was reported that Olivia Wilde had signed on to direct Naughty, a Christmas comedy. Written by Cocaine Bear's Jimmy Warden, the film was produced by LuckyChap Entertainment's Josey McNamara, Margot Robbie and Tom Ackerley. In July 2026, Jennifer Aniston and Peter Dinklage joined the cast as the leads. In September 2026, Chase Sui Wonders joined the cast. John Mathieson serves as the cinematographer. In October 2026, Regina Hall, Ike Barinholtz, Samara Weaving, Kate Berlant, John Early, Kate O'Flynn, Jamie Demetriou, and Dexter Sol Ansell joined the cast.

Principal photography began in London in October 2026.

== Release ==
In December 2023, Universal Pictures acquired the distribution rights. Naughty is scheduled to be released in theaters on November 5, 2027.
