= Carlos Aires =

Spanish artist (born 1974)

Carlos Aires (born 1974) is a Spanish artist. A multidisciplinary artist, he is primarily known for his works in photography and sculpture. Aires was born in Ronda, Málaga.

== Exhibitions ==
- 2005 EuropART, Vienna.
- 2010 Cinema X: I Like to Watch, Museum of Contemporary Art, Toronto
- 2012 Centro de arte contemporáneo de Málaga, Spain.
- 2013 Coup de Ville, WARP, Sint-Niklas, Netherlands
- 2018 Black Sea, in A Short Century: MACBA Collection, Barcelona Museum of Contemporary Art.

== Collections ==
Aires' work is included in the permanent collections of:

- Barcelona Museum of Contemporary Art and
- the Artium Museum, Vitoria-Gasteiz, Spain.

== See also ==
- Francesc Abad
