= Anabasis =

Anabasis (Ancient Greek: ἀνάβασις anábasis) is an ascent or advance. In classical Greek military usage, it was specifically a march or expedition inland from a coast. Anabase and anabasis may also refer to:

== History ==
- Anabasis Alexandri (Anabasis of Alexander), a history of the campaigns of Alexander the Great by Greek historian Arrian
- Anabasis (Xenophon), a history of the expedition of Cyrus the Younger by Greek writer Xenophon
- Siberian Anabasis, a literary name for the Czechoslovak Legions' transit through Siberia during the Russian Civil War, in reference to the epic of Xenophon

== Poetry and fiction ==
- "Anabase", a 1924 poem by Saint-John Perse
- "Anabasis", a 1930 translation of Saint-John Perse's poem by T. S. Eliot
- "Anabasis", poem by Paul Celan, published 1963 in Die Niemandsrose
- Anabasis, a 1994 novel by Ellen Gilchrist
- Anabasis, a novel of Hellenistic Afghanistan and India by Geoffrey Storey

== Music ==
- Anabasis, a fantasy music act on Waerloga Records.
- The Anabasis, an American progressive metal band featuring Ryo Okumoto.
- "Anabasis (Xenophontis)", a song from the album Killing with a Smile by Australian band Parkway Drive.
- "Anabasis", second track on Anastasis, the eighth studio album by Dead Can Dance, released 2012.

== Nature ==
- Anabasis (moth), a genus of snout moths in the family Pyralidae
- Anabasis (plant), a genus of desert shrubs in family Chenopodioideae
- Anabatic wind, a wind which blows up a steep slope or mountain side

== See also ==
- Anabasii, couriers of antiquity
- Katabasis (disambiguation)
