= The Good Mother (2023 film) =

American film by Miles Joris-Peyrafitte

- Theatrical release poster
- Directed by: Miles Joris-Peyrafitte
- Written by: Miles Joris-Peyrafitte; Madison Harrison
- Produced by: Shaun Sanghani; Siena Oberman; Emma Tillinger Koskoff
- Starring: Hilary Swank; Olivia Cooke; Jack Reynor; Hopper Penn
- Cinematography: Charlotte Hornsby
- Edited by: Damian Rodriguez; Taylor Levy
- Music by: Miles Joris-Peyrafitte; Eric Slick
- Production companies: SSS Entertainment; Artemis Pictures; First Love Films
- Distributed by: Vertical Entertainment
- Release date: September 1, 2023
- Running time: 90 minutes
- Country: United States
- Language: English
- Box office: $553,182

The Good Mother is a 2023 American crime thriller film directed by Miles Joris-Peyrafitte and co-written with Madison Harrison. It stars Hilary Swank, Olivia Cooke, Jack Reynor and Hopper Penn.

The film was released by Vertical Entertainment on September 1, 2023.

== Premise ==
After the murder of her estranged son, journalist Marissa Bennings forms an unusual alliance with his pregnant girlfriend to track down those responsible for his death. Together, they confront a realm of narcotics and dishonesty within the city of Albany, unearthing a deeper, more sinister revelation.

== Cast ==
- Hilary Swank as Marissa
- Olivia Cooke as Paige
- Jack Reynor as Toby
- Dilone as Gina
- Norm Lewis as Jim
- Hopper Penn as Ducky
- Larry Fessenden as Gary

== Production ==
In July 2022, Variety reported that Miles Joris-Peyrafitte would direct the film, then titled Mother's Milk, which he co-wrote with Madison Harrison. Hilary Swank, Olivia Cooke and Jack Reynor were cast in leading roles. Shaun Sanghani of SSS Entertainment produced and financed the film, with Siena Oberman of Artemis Pictures and Emma Tillinger Koskoff of First Love Films also producing. Joris-Peyrafitte told People that the idea of the film came from on-set discussions about the opioid epidemic while directing As You Are (2016).

Principal photography took place from June to July 2022 in Albany, New York. Filming was done at Times Union, Empire State Plaza, the Capitol, the Amtrak station in Rensselaer, and on a constructed set inside the New Scotland Avenue (Troop B) Armory on the Sage College of Albany campus.

== Release ==
In June 2023, Vertical Entertainment acquired the distribution rights for North America, United Kingdom, Australia and New Zealand. The film had a limited theatrical release in the United States on September 1, 2023. It was released on digital on-demand platforms in the United States on September 19, 2023. In Australia it was released on DVD and digital platforms on November 1, 2023.

=== Box office ===
The Good Mother made $367k on 419 screens over its first four days. It grossed $503,378 in the United States and Canada, with $49,804 from Russia, for a worldwide total of $553,182.

=== Critical response ===
On the review aggregator website Rotten Tomatoes, 22% of 54 critics' reviews are positive, with an average rating of 4.8/10. The website's consensus reads: "The Good Mother has dramatic potential, a talented cast, and deals with important subjects—but none of that's enough to compensate for the movie's drearily underwhelming story." Metacritic, which uses a weighted average, assigned the film a score of 45 out of 100, based on 12 critics, indicating "mixed or average" reviews.
