= FilmNation Entertainment =

American film production company

FilmNation Entertainment, LLC
- Formerly: FilmNation Entertainment, LLC; FilmNation Distribution, LLC
- Type: Joint venture
- Industry: Films
- Founded: 2008; 18 years ago
- Founder: Glen Basner
- Headquarters: 150 West 22nd Street; 9th Floor; New York City, New York, U.S.
- Key people: Glen Basner (CEO)
- Products: Motion picture; Television programs
- Services: Filmmaking and film distribution; Television production; Theater; Podcasts
- Owner: Steven B. Samuels (68.97%); Village Roadshow Limited (31.03%)
- Number of employees: 40 (2017)
- Divisions: Infrared Pictures
- Website: filmnation.com

FilmNation Entertainment, LLC. is an American entertainment company focused on film production, financing, and distribution.

== History ==
=== 2008–2012: Founding ===
FilmNation Entertainment is an independent film production and distribution company co-founded in 2008 by Glen Basner and Steven Samuels. Initially, the company was a foreign sales firm, selling distribution right in various international markets.

=== 2012–2018: Early growth ===
In 2012, FilmNation produced its first film, Mud, which competed at the Cannes Film Festival. On November 6, 2013, FilmNation Entertainment became part of the American Film Market for the first time. In December 2014, Village Roadshow invested $18 million for 33% stake in the company to make film production a regular part of operations. As a result, Village Roadshow distributes all FilmNation films in Australia via their Roadshow Entertainment banner, regardless of the major studio involved. With growing success, the Los Angeles Times labeled FilmNation as "the emerging Oscar powerhouse you've never heard of."

=== 2018–present: Expansion ===
In April 2018, FilmNation agreed to a $120 million revolving multi-bank credit facility with Bank of America Merrill Lynch and co-led by MUFG Union Bank. The funds would be used to give films larger budgets, take on additional films and enter the TV film, theater, digital and VR content markets plus other strategic investment areas.

In early 2019, FilmNation and Nordic Entertainment Group formed a television joint venture based in the United Kingdom that will operate under the FilmNation name. Nordic Entertainment Group will have first option on exclusive distribution rights to all of the joint venture's productions in the Nordic countries. FilmNation hired Kirstie Macdonald to spearhead the London division.

In September 2022, FilmNation Entertainment announced it had established its production label that would produce & finance feature films with potential turn into franchise build called Infrared Pictures as Drew Simon had served as president of production of FilmNation Entertainment's new production label Infrared Pictures whilst the new production label had appointed Sam Speiser as vice president of production at the new production unit.

In November 2025, FilmNation Entertainment signed a long-term distribution deal with 101 Studios to handle international distribution sales of films distributed by 101 Studios's newly distribution division while FilmNation Entertainment would manage international sales to 101 Studios' upcoming feature films.

== Filmography ==
=== 2009 ===
- The Joneses
- The Road

=== 2010 ===
- Ceremony
- Frozen
- I Love You Too
- The King's Speech
- The Ward

=== 2011 ===
- The Flowers of War
- The Oranges
- Sanctum
- Seeking Justice
- The Skin I Live In
- Take Shelter

=== 2012 ===
- Act of Valor
- Aftershock
- Chernobyl Diaries
- Gambit
- House at the End of the Street
- Lawless
- Lola Versus
- Looper
- Magic Mike
- Midnight's Children
- Mirror Mirror
- Mud
- The Raven
- Red Dawn
- To the Wonder
- To Rome with Love

=== 2013 ===
- 21 & Over
- All Is Lost
- The Bling Ring
- Blue Jasmine
- Crush
- I'm So Excited!
- Nebraska
- Side Effects
- Safe Haven
- Under the Skin

=== 2014 ===
- Clown
- The Imitation Game
- Magic in the Moonlight
- A Most Violent Year
- A Most Wanted Man
- Premature
- The Rewrite
- The Rover
- Top Five
- While We're Young

=== 2015 ===
- American Ultra
- Life
- Knight of Cups
- Mr. Holmes
- Room
- Solace
- Regression
- Self/less
- Tracers
- Truth

=== 2016 ===
- Arrival
- Army of One
- Café Society
- The Founder
- Genius
- Indignation
- Julieta
- Midnight Special
- Miss Sloane
- Nocturnal Animals
- The Promise
- Sing Street
- Sully
- The Whole Truth
- Zero Days

=== 2017 ===
- The Big Sick
- Beatriz at Dinner
- The Children Act
- Disobedience
- Gifted
- Kill Switch
- Last Flag Flying
- Logan Lucky
- The Man with the Iron Heart
- The Only Living Boy in New York
- The Sense of an Ending
- Sleepless
- Song to Song
- The Wall
- Wonderstruck
- Wonder Wheel

=== 2018 ===
- Beautiful Boy
- The Catcher Was a Spy
- Don't Worry, He Won't Get Far on Foot
- City of Lies
- Gloria Bell
- Life Itself
- The Nightingale
- Show Dogs
- Suspiria
- Wildlife

=== 2019 ===
- 47 Meters Down: Uncaged
- 7500
- The Aeronauts
- The Day Shall Come
- The Irishman
- The King
- The Last Vermeer
- Late Night
- The Laundromat
- The Lodge
- Lucky Day
- Marriage Story
- Pain and Glory
- The Two Popes

=== 2020 ===
- Bad Hair
- The Courier
- The Glorias
- Greyhound
- The Human Voice
- The Nest
- Palm Springs
- The Personal History of David Copperfield
- Promising Young Woman

=== 2021 ===
- Larry Flynt for President
- The Map of Tiny Perfect Things
- Operation Mincemeat
- Parallel Mothers
- Red Rocket
- Reminiscence
- Spencer

=== 2022 ===
- The 355
- Baby Ruby
- Dog
- Emancipation
- The Good House
- The Good Nurse
- Happening
- The Outfit
- The People We Hate at the Wedding
- Sharp Stick
- Three Thousand Years of Longing

=== 2023 ===
- Asphalt City
- Down Low
- Finally Dawn
- Fingernails
- Firebrand
- Flora and Son
- Knock at the Cabin
- Knox Goes Away
- One Life
- To Catch a Killer
- Waitress: The Musical
- The Young Wife
- You Hurt My Feelings

=== 2024 ===
- Anora
- Babes
- Blink Twice
- Conclave
- The Crow
- The Life of Chuck
- Maria
- The Room Next Door
- Small Things like These
- Treasure
- Without Blood

=== 2025 ===
- Alpha
- Bad Apples
- Carolina Caroline
- In the Lost Lands
- Last Breath
- Novocaine (under Infrared Pictures)
- Roofman
- The Wave

=== 2026 ===
- Bunker
- I Play Rocky
- The Invite
- A Talent for Murder
- The Uprising
- Way of the Warrior Kid
- Wildwood

=== 2027 ===
- Skeletons (under Infrared Pictures)
- Ti Amo!

=== Upcoming ===
- 4 Kids Walk Into a Bank
- Am I the Wave?
- Asymmetry
- Bad Bridgets
- Brides
- Gold Mountain
- Hillside Drive
- Honeymoon / Funeral
- King Snake
- Last Dance
- Painter (under Infrared Pictures)
- The Passenger
- Séance on a Wet Afternoon
- State of Emergency
- They Know
- Untitled Armando Iannucci film
