= Katabasis (disambiguation) =

Katabasis or catabasis (Ancient Greek: κατάβασις, from κατὰ 'down' and βαίνω 'go') is a descent of some type, such as moving downhill, moving to a lower realm of existence, a military retreat, or a regression of some type.

- Katabasis, a trip to the underworld or the land of the dead
- Katabatic wind, cold winds that come from glacial mountains downward
- Katabasia, a type of hymn in the Eastern Orthodox Church and Eastern Catholic Churches which follow the Byzantine Rite
- Katabasis (novel), a 2025 novel by R. F. Kuang

== See also ==
- Anabasis (ἀνάβασις 'going up, ascent') or a journey to the interior, the reverse of a katabasis in Greek
