= Borderline (2025 film) =

2025 film by Jimmy Warden

- Release poster
- Directed by: Jimmy Warden
- Written by: Jimmy Warden
- Produced by: Tom Ackerley; Josey McNamara; Hadeel Reda; Brian Duffield
- Starring: Samara Weaving; Ray Nicholson; Jimmie Fails; Alba Baptista; Eric Dane
- Cinematography: Michael Alden Lloyd
- Edited by: Joe Galdo
- Music by: Mondo Boys
- Production companies: LuckyChap Entertainment; Red A Entertainment; Jurassic Party Productions; Roscoe Pictures; Productivity Media
- Distributed by: Magnet Releasing
- Release date: March 14, 2025
- Running time: 95 minutes
- Country: United States
- Language: English
- Box office: $284,704

Borderline is a 2025 American comedy thriller film written and directed by Jimmy Warden in his directorial debut. Starring Samara Weaving, Ray Nicholson, Jimmie Fails, Alba Baptista, and Eric Dane, the film centers on a pop star (Weaving) whose home is invaded by an obsessive fan (Nicholson) who believes they are meant to get married and manipulates her into going along with his delusion.

The film was released in the United States on March 14, 2025, by Magnet Releasing, and received mixed reviews from critics.

== Plot ==
In 1990s Los Angeles, obsessive fan Paul Duerson arrives at the mansion of pop star and actress Sofia Minor. Paul is under the delusion that he and Sofia are in love and plans to propose. When confronted by Sofia's bodyguard, Bell, Paul threatens suicide with a knife. Hallucinating that Bell is Sofia, he proposes with an imaginary engagement ring. Bell plays along in an attempt to defuse the situation, but Paul stabs him in the abdomen.

Six months later, Bell returns to work against the wishes of his young daughter, Abby, who worries for his safety. Bell discovers that Paul has escaped from prison along with fellow inmate Penny Pascal, and warns Sofia. Sofia and her new boyfriend, professional basketball player DeVante Rhodes, are initially confident in Sofia's security team. However, the two argue after Rhodes discovers that Sofia had been asked to befriend him as a potential co-star for her next film, and Rhodes leaves.

Arriving at the mansion, Penny kills Sofia's security guard, while Paul breaks in and knocks Sofia unconscious. Meanwhile, Paul's friend and accomplice J. H. Calhoun abducts Abby, Bell, and Abby's aunt Eleanor from Bell's apartment. He shoots Bell in the head and drives Abby and Eleanor to Sofia's mansion. Sofia wakes up locked in the booth of her home recording studio. She tries to reason with Paul, but he remains delusional. Paul leaves Sofia with Penny while he goes to put on a tuxedo. Sofia escapes from the booth and, after a struggle, sets Penny on fire.

Paul returns to the studio and finds Rhodes, who had come back to check on Sofia. Continuing to hallucinate, Paul now believes that Rhodes is Sofia. The group is taken to a church, where Paul forces a pastor to perform a wedding ceremony between him and Rhodes as the others (including Sofia) watch perplexedly. Bell, who survived the shooting, finds the church and calls the police. After the ceremony, Paul kisses Rhodes and then stabs him in the side. A struggle then ensues, and Bell and Sofia disarm Paul while a still-alive Rhodes kills J. H. by slitting his throat. As emergency services arrive, Sofia and Rhodes agree to rekindle their relationship and Bell promises Abby that he will find a safer job. Paul, in the back of a police car, hallucinates that he and Sofia are happy newlyweds.

== Cast ==
- Samara Weaving as Sofia Minor, a pop star
- Ray Nicholson as Paul Duerson, an obsessive fan of Sofia
- Eric Dane as Bell, Sofia's bodyguard
- Jimmie Fails as DeVante Rhodes, a professional basketball player
- Alba Baptista as Penny, Duerson's female accomplice
- Patrick Cox as J. H. Calhoun, Duerson's male accomplice

== Production ==
In December 2020, a screenplay titled Borderline, written by Jimmy Warden and backed by LuckyChap Entertainment, was featured on The Black List and received 11 mentions. In May 2022, Samara Weaving teased the development of a project in collaboration with her husband Warden during an interview with Harper's Bazaar, with Warden set to write and direct while Weaving would star. Eric Dane attached to star in the same month. In September, it was reported that the film was in production, marking Warden's directorial debut, with Productivity Media co-producing and Radiant Films International handling world distribution rights. The cast also includes Ray Nicholson, Alba Baptista, and Jimmie Fails, with Nicholson expressing immediate interest in the project after reading the script due to his attraction to the morally imperfect character.

Principal photography began in September 2022 in Vancouver, Canada. The film reportedly entered post-production by November, with Margot Robbie attached as an executive producer. Post-production took place at the newly opened Elemental Post Opens Studio in Vancouver, and wrapped up in February 2023, while Warden stated that he would not move forward with the project in the same month until after completing the promotion and release cycle for Cocaine Bear (2023). In August, the film was presented at market screenings during the 48th Toronto International Film Festival.

Weaving stated that her character, a pop star named Sofia, was inspired by Christina Aguilera, Britney Spears, and Madonna.

== Release ==
Borderline was released in theaters and on digital platforms in the United States on March 14, 2025, by Magnet Releasing.

=== Home media ===
The film was released on Blu-ray and DVD by Magnolia Home Entertainment on June 10, 2025.

== Reception ==
On the review aggregator website Rotten Tomatoes, 59% of 61 critics' reviews are positive, with an average rating of 5.4/10. The website's consensus reads: "Elevated by Samara Weaving and Ray Nicholson's performances to a point, this fun-enough romp eventually finds itself on the Borderline." Metacritic, which uses a weighted average, assigned the film a score of 58 out of 100, based on six critics, indicating "mixed or average" reviews.

B.J. Colangelo of /Film found Borderline to be a thought-provoking horror-comedy with "some pretty fantastic performances", that cleverly subverts gender expectations and societal norms, while effectively blending humor with a chilling commentary on obsession and mental health. Brennan Klein of Screen Rant rated the film 7/10, also praising the performances of Samara Weaving and Ray Nicholson while noting that it effectively utilized its limited budget despite flaws like a "slow" opening act and a disappointing performance by Eric Dane, ultimately declaring that it "consistently delivers both thrills and laughs" with a "vibrant music sensibility".

Clint Worthington of RogerEbert.com gave the film 2.5 out of 4 stars, describing it as "a droll mixture" of humor and horror that devolves into a "confounding tonal mess" that fails to balance its dark themes, undermining potentially interesting dynamics between the characters despite some memorable moments and performances. Meagan Navarro of Bloody Disgusting rated the film 2 out of 5 stars, criticizing Jimmy Warden's "disjointed storytelling" that trivializes serious subject matter, leading to a "confused" and "directionless" narrative that squanders the strong leads and diminishes its potential impact.
