= Habib Tengour =

Algerian poet

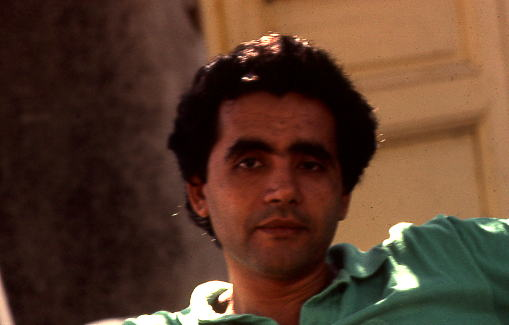
- Habib in 1989
- Born: March 29, 1947 (age 79); Mostaganem, French Algeria
- Education: University of Mentouri
- Occupation: Poet

Habib Tengour (born March 29, 1947) is a French-Algerian poet, sociologist and anthropologist. He was born in Mostaganem in eastern French Algeria in 1947. The Tengour family moved to France when Habib was five years old, and he grew up there in a working-class household.

He studied sociology in France and continued his studies in Algeria at Constantine University. Although his work draws heavily on various aspects of Algerian culture and tradition, Tengour writes mainly in French. His first published work was a book of surrealist poetry Tapapakitaques ou la poésie-île (1976). His principal translator in English is Pierre Joris, professor at the University of Albany.

Tengour lives in Paris and Constantine.

== Selected works ==
- Exile is My Trade: A Habib Tengour Reader, translated by Pierre Joris (Black Widow Press, 2011)
- Empedocles's Sandal, translated by Pierre Joris (Duration Press, 1999)
- Tapapakitaques ou la poésie-île (1976)
