= Dreamland (2019 American film) =

- Theatrical release poster
- Directed by: Miles Joris-Peyrafitte
- Written by: Nicolaas Zwart
- Produced by: Tom Ackerley; Rian Cahill; Brad Feinstein; Brian Kavanaugh-Jones; Josey McNamara; Margot Robbie
- Starring: Finn Cole; Margot Robbie; Travis Fimmel; Garrett Hedlund; Kerry Condon; Darby Camp; Lola Kirke
- Narrated by: Lola Kirke
- Cinematography: Lyle Vincent
- Edited by: Abbi Jutkowitz; Brett M. Reed
- Music by: Patrick Higgins
- Production companies: LuckyChap Entertainment; Automatik Entertainment; Romulus Entertainment; Titan World Entertainment
- Distributed by: Vertical Entertainment
- Release dates: April 28, 2019 (Tribeca); November 13, 2020 (United States)
- Running time: 101 minutes
- Country: United States
- Language: English
- Box office: $320,814

Dreamland is a 2019 American period thriller film directed by Miles Joris-Peyrafitte from a screenplay by Nicolaas Zwart. The film stars Finn Cole, Margot Robbie, Travis Fimmel, Garrett Hedlund, Kerry Condon, Darby Camp and Lola Kirke.

Dreamland had its world premiere at the Tribeca Film Festival on April 28, 2019, and was released via a limited release on November 13, 2020, by Vertical Entertainment, followed by its video on demand release on November 17, 2020, by Paramount Home Entertainment.

== Plot ==
In 1930s Texas, Eugene Evans lives with his family in a small town. The land is drought-stricken and dust storms plague the country. When Eugene is five years old, his father abandons his family. Eugene lives his days stealing dime novels with his buddy Joe, fantasizing of another life. His mother remarried a lawman, George Evans, who does his best to act as a father figure to Eugene and his younger sister Phoebe.

One day, a town meeting takes place and the sheriff shows a wanted poster of Allison Wells, who is wanted for $10,000 for bank robbing and murder. Eugene and Joe intend to search for her. George tells Eugene to take responsibility and look for work. Later, Eugene sneaks to the barn to read. He notices bandages and a woman pointing a revolver at him. Recognising her as Allison from the wanted poster, Eugene and Allison make a deal. He cleans her wounds and, in return, Allison will tell him what happened.

To gain Eugene's trust, Allison gives him the revolver. She explains that when she was robbing a bank, the police took no issue firing into an innocent crowd and a stray bullet killed a young girl. Shocked by the death, Allison was shot in the leg before speeding off in a car. Alison tells Eugene that she will give him $20,000 if he helps her get a vehicle to Mexico. Eugene agrees.

Phoebe sees Eugene peeping into the barn and asks him what he's looking at. He tells her there are dead dogs in the barn. She doesn't believe him and goes into the barn, as Allison hides in fear, but runs out after the barn door slams loudly. Eugene tells Joe that he has met someone offering them money for Joe's family's car. Joe denies the request.

Returning to the barn Eugene finds an anxious Allison who claims she is feeling cooped up and needs to get out of the area. Eugene takes her swimming at a local watering hole. Almost being caught by the property owner, the two take off back to the farm.

At the town dance, Eugene overhears George mentioning evidence against Allison at the police station. Stealing his stepfather's keys, Eugene breaks into the evidence room and discovers photographs of the crime scene. He discovers Alison had lied and failed to mention her accomplice, Perry, who killed people. While running from the police both were shot and Perry died. Eugene confronts Allison, claiming she lied to him.

George discovers a torn cloth from Allison’s dress and takes it to the sheriff as proof of her being in the area. The sheriff fires George, believing he gave Eugene the keys to gain evidence which Eugene burned. George drives back to the farm. George confronts Eugene, telling him they may lose their home.

Eugene and Allison leave town in the family truck. Allison believes Eugene came because he loves her and tells him she does not love him in return and intended to go alone. Eugene reminds her that his father is in Mexico and this is his chance to find him. They stop at a hotel. Allison takes a shower and invites Eugene in, leading to them having sex.

The following morning, in need of money, they rob a bank. Eugene holds the customers hostage as Allison raids the tellers. One hostage takes advantage of a brief hesitation and takes aim at Allison. Eugene fires one shot into the man's head, killing him. They make their getaway.

Driving down the road, Eugene, wracked with guilt, insists they pull over. They do and Allison pleads with him to get back in the car, while he walks away into the woods. George and a small posse are on their trail, with Eugene's sister Phoebe hidden in the back seat. Allison and Eugene both admit their wrongdoings to each other. Allison embraces him and tells him they can baptize themselves in the ocean and begin a new life together.

As they run back to the car, George fires a shot, hitting Allison. As she lies dying, Eugene kneels with her. George tells his men to lay down their weapons as Eugene fires a shot into George's leg. George tells his men not to fire at Eugene. Phoebe yells at him to run. Eugene hurries to the truck and quickly speeds off. Grown-up Phoebe, narrating the entire story, says the family never saw Eugene again, though she is keeping his legend alive.

== Cast ==
- Finn Cole as Eugene Evans
- Margot Robbie as Allison Wells
- Travis Fimmel as George Evans
- Garrett Hedlund as Perry Montroy (special participation)
- Kerry Condon as Olivia Evans
- Darby Camp as Phoebe Evans
- Lola Kirke as older Phoebe Evans, also The Narrator
- Stephen Dinh as Joe Garza

== Production ==
In May 2017, Margot Robbie joined the cast of the film, with Miles Joris-Peyrafitte directing from a screenplay by Nicolaas Zwart. Robbie served as a producer on the film, alongside Tom Ackerley, Josey McNamara, Brian Kavanaugh-Jones and Rian Cahill, under their LuckyChap Entertainment and Automatik banners. In 2017 Romulus Entertainment came on to produce and finance with Brad Feinstein producing. In October 2017, Finn Cole, Travis Fimmel, Darby Camp and Kerry Condon joined the cast of the film.

Principal photography began in October 2017, in New Mexico.

== Release ==
It had its world premiere at the Tribeca Film Festival on April 28, 2019. In September 2020, Vertical Entertainment acquired U.S. distribution rights to the film while Paramount Home Entertainment acquired home media and TV rights. It was given a limited release on November 13, 2020, followed by video on demand on November 17, 2020.

== Reception ==
On review aggregator website Rotten Tomatoes, the film holds an approval rating of 60% based on 58 reviews, with an average rating of 5.8/10. The site's critical consensus reads, "Dreamland's frustratingly diffuse narrative approach is consistently offset by typically strong work from Margot Robbie in a central role." On Metacritic, the film holds a rating of 57 out of 100, based on 12 critics, indicating "mixed or average" reviews.
