= Terminal (film) =

2018 thriller film

- Theatrical release poster
- Directed by: Vaughn Stein
- Written by: Vaughn Stein
- Produced by: David Barron; Molly Hassell; Arianne Fraser; Margot Robbie; Tom Ackerley; Josey McNamara; Sophia Kerr; Teun Hilte; Habib Paracha
- Starring: Margot Robbie; Simon Pegg; Dexter Fletcher; Max Irons; Mike Myers
- Cinematography: Christopher Ross
- Edited by: Johanhes Bock; Alex Marquez
- Music by: Rupert Gregson-Williams; Anthony Clarke
- Production companies: Highland Film Group; Hassell Free Productions; Mischellanous Entertainment; BH RuYi Media; Subotica; Rapid Farms Productions Limited; LuckyChap Entertainment; Beagle Pug Films; Ingenious Media
- Distributed by: Arrow Films (United Kingdom and Ireland); RLJE Films (United States)
- Release dates: 11 May 2018 (United States); 6 July 2018 (United Kingdom and Ireland); 16 August 2018 (Hong Kong)
- Running time: 95 minutes
- Countries: Ireland; United Kingdom; Hungary; Hong Kong; United States
- Language: English
- Box office: $843,970

Terminal is a 2018 neo-noir thriller film written and directed by Vaughn Stein. The film stars Margot Robbie alongside an ensemble cast, featuring Simon Pegg, Dexter Fletcher, Max Irons, and Mike Myers. The plot follows the intertwining lives of two assassins, a fatally ill teacher, a custodian, and a waitress, all of whom become part of a murderous plan.

The film is an international co-production between Ireland, the United Kingdom, Hungary, Hong Kong, and the United States. Principal photography took place in Budapest, Hungary during May 2016.

Terminal was released in North America on 11 May 2018, by RLJE Films. The film premiered in the United Kingdom on 26 June 2018 at the Edinburgh International Film Festival as part of the American Dreams Strand. It was released theatrically in the United Kingdom and Ireland on 6 July 2018 by Arrow Films. The film received generally negative reviews from critics, who criticized the plot, narrative, pacing, and direction, though some praised Robbie's performance and the visual style. It was also a box office bomb, grossing a mere $843,970.

== Plot ==
A young woman meets a mysterious employer in a confession booth and implores him to employ her as his sole contract killer. To prove her worth, she offers to eliminate his other contractors. In exchange for her efforts, she asks if he can find someone for her. Bill is standing on a deserted train platform and is told by a limping janitor that no trains will be coming until 4:04 in the morning. The janitor suggests he wait in the 24-hour cafe. There, he converses with Annie, a waitress, who notices that he has a terminal disease, and is suicidal. She discusses various ways he can kill himself.

The story shifts to three weeks earlier; Illing, a hitman, is captured by Annie, who is posing as a prostitute. He awakes to find himself handcuffed to a bed before Annie incapacitates and kills him.

Mr. Franklyn, the employer, calls his two hitmen — Vince and Alfred — and orders them to pick up a briefcase from the lockers at the terminal. They take it to the cafe and find a pack of matches and an envelope of money. They wonder why Mr. Franklyn has called on them, and not Illing. The match pack is from a strip joint, where they find a dancer resembling the waitress Annie from earlier. She takes the envelope of money as payment for passing on information about the hit Mr. Franklyn wants them to do. She comes on strong to Alfred but is dismissive of Vince. The hitmen are told to wait in an apartment and to shoot a person in the window opposite when told. Vince is also secretly told via a phone call to then kill Alfred. The waitress tells Alfred that Vince will try to kill him, so Alfred should kill Vince once the hit is completed. Mr. Franklyn watches from his lair, with monitors displaying camera footage of the cafe and the hitmen's hideout.

Back at the train terminal, the waitress takes Bill to an abandoned air shaft and tries to talk him into committing suicide. Although he described throwing himself down a deep, dark hole as his final act, he cannot jump. The waitress teases him, and Bill tells the waitress that she is a "naughty girl". This triggers a memory from his days as a school teacher, where he had two girls in his class that he abused. The waitress reveals that she is one of those girls, and then she stabs Bill in the neck with his pen and pushes him down the shaft. Meanwhile, Mr. Franklyn calls the hitmen's apartment and says that they should be ready to take the shot. Vince trains his sniper's rifle at the window across the courtyard but is surprised to find Annie in his crosshairs. Alfred pulls his gun on Vince and disarms him. Annie comes over and Alfred shoots Vince. Alfred and Annie leave the apartment and run into the janitor, who is arriving to clean up the murder scene.

Back in the terminal, the waitress turns on Alfred, tells him that she is not infatuated with him, and shoots him dead. The janitor comes along to clean up the body. The waitress decides to help the janitor take the bodies to the top of the air shaft and drop them both into it. The janitor returns to the terminal and enters the janitor's closet, which is actually Mr. Franklyn's control center. He is revealed to be Mr. Franklyn in disguise, removing his prosthetic bad teeth and fake latex skin. He stops limping and walks normally. There are dozens of attaché cases lined up for future jobs. As he leaves his "closet", he is accosted by the waitress and her doppelgänger, revealed to be a set of twins, Annie and Bonnie.

The twins tie up Mr. Franklyn and describe how their mother died. She was being pursued by her partner, revealed to be Mr. Franklyn - a.k.a. Clinton Sharp - after she witnessed him murder someone and ran back to her flat to protect her twin girls. Mr. Franklyn poured petrol in her home, and set it on fire. The mother had time to push the girls out a broken window, but could not save herself. After that, the twins spent the rest of their childhood in an orphanage being molested by Bill. The twins tell Mr. Franklyn that he is their biological father and they are ready to exact their revenge. They lobotomize him, finally kill him, then walk out of the terminal together.

== Cast ==
- Margot Robbie as Annie / Bonnie
- Simon Pegg as Bill
- Dexter Fletcher as Vince
- Max Irons as Alfred
- Mike Myers as Janitor / Night Superintendent / Supe / Clinton Sharp / Mr. Franklyn
- Katarina Čas as Chloe Merryweather
- Nick Moran as Illing
- Jourdan Dunn as Conejo
- Matthew Lewis as Lenny
- Thomas Turgoose as Raymond
- Jay Simpson as Danny
- Ben Griffin as Toby
- Robert Goodman as Priest
- Paul Reynolds as Doctor

== Production ==
=== Development ===
On 12 February 2016, it was announced that Margot Robbie would headline and produce a "noir thriller" written and directed by Vaughn Stein, through her production company LuckyChap Entertainment. Highland Film Group would be handling finance and introducing the project to international buyers in Berlin. Creative Artists Agency would handle domestic distribution sales in the United States. David Barron of Beagle Pug Films was also attached to the project as a producer. On 24 May 2016, Simon Pegg, Mike Myers, Max Irons and Dexter Fletcher joined the cast alongside Robbie. This film marks Mike Myers's first non-documentary film since 2012.

=== Filming ===
Principal photography on the film began in May 2016 in Budapest, Hungary, and lasted over the course of 27 nights. By September 2016, post production was near completion and a rough cut was screened at the 2016 Toronto International Film Festival for potential international buyers.

=== Distribution ===
Highland Film Group attended the 2017 Cannes Film Festival for selling distribution rights for the film. On 24 January 2018, RLJE Films acquired distribution rights in the United States. Initially, in September 2016, Icon Film Distribution acquired distribution rights for the United Kingdom and Ireland. However, in February 2018, Arrow Films overtook distribution rights.

== Release ==
Terminal received a limited theatrical release and was simultaneously released through video on demand in the United States on 11 May 2018 by RLJE Films. The film premiered in the United Kingdom on 26 June 2018 at the Edinburgh International Film Festival as part of the American Dreams Strand. It was released theatrically in limited theatres in the United Kingdom and Ireland on 6 July 2018 by Arrow Films. On 9 September 2016, the first official image of the film was released at the Toronto International Film Festival, featuring Robbie in character. The film was released "unrated" in the United States by the Motion Picture Association of America. In the United Kingdom, it received a 15 certificate by the British Board of Film Classification for "strong language, violence, suicide references, threat". In Ireland, the film was given a 16 certificate by the Irish Film Classification Office for "strong violence, injury and language, and suicide theme".

=== Home media ===
The film was released on Blu-ray and DVD in the United States on 26 June 2018 by RLJ Entertainment. It was released on Blu-ray, DVD, Digital and On Demand in the United Kingdom and Ireland on 6 August 2018 by Arrow Video.

== Reception ==
Terminal received generally negative reviews from critics, with many criticising the plot, pacing, direction and narrative, though Robbie's performance, the film's visual style and production values received praise. On review aggregator website Rotten Tomatoes, the film holds an approval rating of 22% based on 65 reviews, and an average rating of 4.5/10. The site's critical consensus reads, "Worth seeking out for only the most hardcore of Margot Robbie completists, Terminal lives down to the medical definition of its title in dreadfully derivative fashion." On Metacritic, the film has a weighted average score of 27 out of 100, based on 20 critics, indicating "generally unfavorable reviews".

Rolling Stone's Peter Travers panned the film, awarding zero stars, stating, "The title of this wretched Tarantino-meets-Blade Runner noir rip-off doubles as a diagnosis". Rex Reed of the New York Observer also awarded zero stars, calling the film "a turgid, pretentious, and incomprehensible existential joke." David Edelstein of Vulture gave a negative review, criticising the plot's focus, saying, "since the film doesn't establish a baseline of reality, it's hard to pick out a premise." David Ehrlich of IndieWire gave the film a D, writing, "Vaughn Stein's Terminal takes a mess of dead tropes and Frankensteins them together into a crime saga that's in desperate need of brains. And a soul. And a story." Jacob Knight of Birth.Movies.Death. heavily criticised Stein's direction and wrote, "no amount of pretty pictures could save a script this abysmally written. Stein has penned scene after scene after scene of nasty people talking circles around one another, no character defined by anything beyond their comic book-ready aesthetic." Jeffrey M. Anderson of The San Francisco Examiner awarded the film two and a half stars out of four, describing the film as "mediocre", though praising Robbie's performance, writing, "Robbie is a bright one, and even though Terminal isn't much, it offers a chance to watch her shine." Clint Worthington of Consequence of Sound heavily criticised Stein's direction, calling the film a "waste of time" and "An entirely empty exercise in dated, exhausting hyper-stylized filmmaking."

Richard Roeper of the Chicago Sun-Times praised the film, awarding three out of four stars, writing, "The final 15 minutes or so of Terminal are flat-out nutso. One can imagine Robbie, Myers et al., breaking into laughter after hearing "Cut!" — not out of disrespect for the material, but out of sheer giddiness for having the opportunity to try something so audacious. Even when it doesn't work, Terminal is a film with never a dull moment." Kenneth Seward Jr. of IGN gave a mostly positive review, scoring the film a 7.5 out of 10, indicating it is "Good", stating, "Terminal is an interesting revenge story that mostly works. There are a few missteps, namely a few wasted characters and a straight forward plot made needlessly complicated. Still, Vaughn Stein should be pleased with what's here." Colin Covert of the Minneapolis Star Tribune gave a highly positive review, awarding three and a half out of four stars, praising the film's visual style, noting, "Every moment of Terminal engages the eye, and — unexpectedly — the mind. Even the makeup is arresting — the arterial red of Annie's lipstick is hypnotic."

James Berardinelli of Reelviews gave a mixed review, awarding the film two and a half stars out of four, writing, "At its best, Terminal is a tasty, tangy parfait – a kaleidoscope of neon-tinged visuals and a twisty storyline with a tortured timeline." However, he criticised the film's ending as "generic" and "anticlimactic". John DeFore of The Hollywood Reporter gave a mostly negative review criticising Stein's direction, writing, "An airless debut that says much about its writer-director's cultural diet and little about anything else in the world, Vaughn Stein's Terminal blends tropes from several sorts of crime flicks into a soundstagey affair that's more brittle than hard-boiled." Jeannette Catsoulis of The New York Times also gave a negative review, calling the film "a flashy, hyperstylized bore." Shaun Munro of Flickering Myth gave a mostly positive review, stating, "It's messy and navel-gazingly ostentatious, but fitfully entertaining thanks largely to a scene-stealing, against-type performance from Simon Pegg."
