= Maryse Bergé-Lavigne =

French politician

Senator for Haute-Garonne
- In office 24 September 1989 – 30 September 2008

Personal details
- Born: 29 January 1941 (age 85) Pamiers, Ariège, France
- Party: Socialist Party
- Occupation: Teacher

Maryse Bergé-Lavigne (born 29 January 1941) is a French teacher and politician of the Socialist Party. A teacher to children with special needs, she was a member of the Regional Council of Midi-Pyrénées and was later elected to represent the Haute-Garonne department in the Senate from 1989 to 2008.

== Biography ==
Bergé-Lavigne was born in Pamiers, Ariège on 29 January 1941. She is the daughter of Jean Bergé and Alice Bergé (née Durrieu). Bergé-Lavigne received her education at Lycée Raymond Naves, Toulouse, earning a certificate in the teaching of children with learning difficulties. She became a teacher to children with special needs.

A member of the Socialist Party, Bergé-Lavigne was a member of the Human Rights League. She was a member of the Regional Council of Midi-Pyrénées from 1986 and was a member of the Regional Agency for the Environment, Midi-Pyrénées. At the 1989 French Senate election on 24 September 1989, Bergé-Lavigne successfully stood for election to represent the Haute-Garonne department in the Senate. She was a member of the Parliamentary Delegation for Demographic Issues and of the Parliamentary Office for Public Policy Evaluation. Bergé-Lavigne was also a member of the Committee on Foreign Affairs, Defence and the Armed Forces, a secretary of the Senate, and was vice-president of the French group of the Inter-Parliamentary Union. She abstained from voting for a Treaty establishing a Constitution for Europe in 2005 against her party's wishes.

She was re-elected to office at the 1998 French senate election held on 27 September 1998 and she stood down from the Senate on 30 September 2008.
