= Pierre Joris =

American poet (1946–2025)

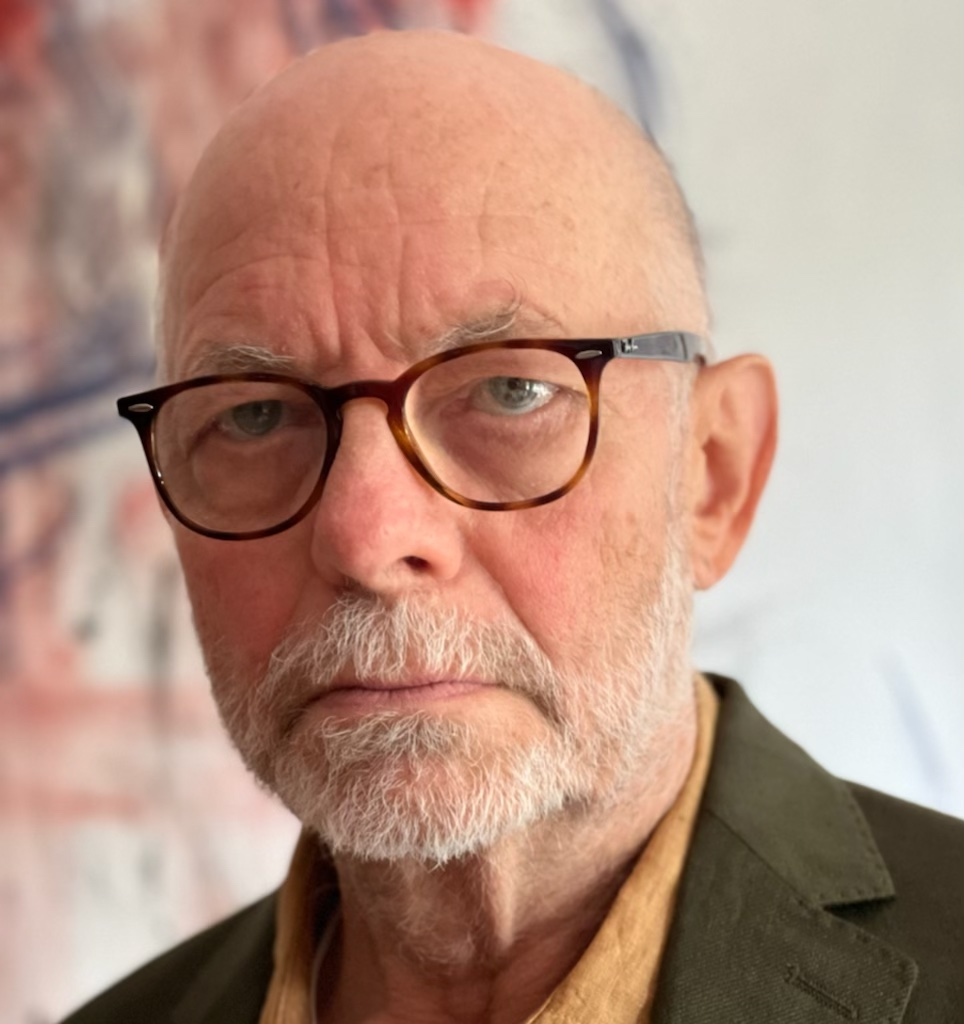
- Joris by Nicole Peyrafitte
- Born: July 14, 1946; Strasbourg, France
- Died: February 26, 2025 (aged 78); New York City, US
- Citizenship: Luxembourg; United States
- Education: Bard College (AB)
- Occupations: poet, essayist, editor, translator
- Notable work: Breccia: Selected Poems 1972-1986, Poasis, A Nomad Poetics, Barzakh
- Spouse: Nicole Peyrafitte
- Children: Miles Joris-Peyrafitte and Joseph Mastantuono
- Awards: 2020 Batty Weber Award for Lifetime Literary Achievement, Luxembourg.

Pierre Joris (July 14, 1946 – February 26, 2025) was a Luxembourgish-American poet, essayist, translator, and anthologist. He moved between Europe, North Africa, and the United States for fifty-five years, publishing over eighty books.

== Writing and editing work ==
Joris translated three books by Paul Celan from 2005 to 2011: Paul Celan: Selections, The Meridian: Final Version—Drafts—Materials, and Lightduress, which received the 2005 PEN Poetry Translation Award. With Jerome Rothenberg he edited Poems for the Millennium, vol. 1 & 2: The University of California Book of Modern & Postmodern Poetry.

In 2011, Litteraria Pragensia of Charles University, Prague, published Pierre Joris: Cartographies of the In-between, edited by Peter Cockelbergh, with essays on Joris' work including those by Mohammed Bennis, Charles Bernstein, Nicole Brossard, Clayton Eshleman, Allen Fisher, Christine Hume, Robert Kelly, Abdelwahab Meddeb, Jennifer Moxley, Jean Portante, Alice Notley, and his wife, Nicole Peyrafitte.

He published several books between 2014 and 2016, including An American Suite, Barzakh: Poems 2000-2012, A Voice full of Cities: The Collected Essays of Robert Kelly (co-edited with Peter Cockelbergh), and The University of California Book of North African Literature (coedited with Habib Tengour).

His translation of Egyptian poet Safaa Fathy's Revolution Goes Through Walls came out in 2018. In 2019, he published Arabia (not so) Deserta (essays on Maghrebi and Mashreqi literature and culture). In 2020, his two final Celan translations came out: Microliths They Are, Little Stones and The Collected Earlier Poetry.

Between 2017 and 2018, two books of his poems were published: Adonis and Pierre Joris, Conversations in the Pyrenees and The Book of U.

Joris's last volumes were Interglacial Narrows (Poems 2015–2021) and Always the Many, Never the One: Conversations In-between, with Florent Toniello, both from Contra Mundum Press.

== Biography ==
=== Early life and education ===
Pierre Joris was born in Strasbourg, France on July 14, 1946. He was brought up in Luxembourg, where he graduated from the Lycée Classique in Diekirch in 1964. From age 18 onwards, he moved between Europe, the United States, and North Africa. He held both Luxembourgish and American citizenship.

After medical studies in Paris, he decided to make poetry his career. In 1967, he moved to the US where he earned a BA (Honors) at Bard College, before moving to New York City where he edited the underground arts magazine Corpus from 1969 to 1970.

Moving to London, England in 1971, Joris founded the literary magazine Sixpack (with William Prescott), which published poetry and translations.

Between 1972 and 1975, Joris pursued graduate work, first in Cultural Studies at the University of London's Institute of United States Studies, and then at Essex University, where he earned an MA in the Theory and Practice of Literary Translation in 1975. He published his first book of poems The Fifth Season in 1972.

=== Career ===
From 1976 to 1979, Joris taught in the English Department at the Université Constantine 1 in Algeria. He moved back to London in 1979, and in the early 1980s taught in various institutions, including the University of Maryland's United Kingdom campuses. He also continued as a freelance writer and translator. Relocating to Paris, Joris started working as an editor for France Culture, the National French radio station.

In 1987, invited was by the Iowa International Writing Program to spend the fall in Iowa City, which he used as an occasion to relocate to the United States. He first moved to Binghamton, N.Y., where he started a Ph.D. in Comparative Literature he was to complete in 1990. From there, he moved to San Diego where he was active as visiting poet in the University of California, San Diego Literature Department.

Joris started to collaborate with poet and anthologist Jerome Rothenberg. In 1993 they co-edited and co-translated pppppp : THE SELECTED WRITINGS OF KURT SCHWITTERS, which received the 1994 Pen Center USA West Award for Translation. The following year he published the selected poems of Pablo Picasso, The Death of the Count of Orgaz & Other Writings. Joris and Rothenberg also began work on a two volume anthology of 20th Century Avant-Garde writings, POEMS FOR THE MILLENNIUM: A UNIVERSITY OF CALIFORNIA BOOK OF MODERN & POSTMODERN POETRY, the first volume of which was published in 1995 and the second in 1998.

In 1992, Joris took up a teaching post in the Department of English at the University at Albany, where he taught until his retirement in 2013. In 2009, he moved to Bay Ridge, Brooklyn, where he lived with his wife Nicole Peyrafitte, a performance artist, painter and singer. Peyrafitte illustrated and created covers for most of Joris' books from 1992. They were involved in a series of collaborative performance actions, under the title "Domopoetics Karstic Actions."

== Personal life and death ==
Joris was married to Nicole Peyrafitte. He died from cancer in Brooklyn, New York City on February 27, 2025, at the age of 78.

== Selected publications ==
=== Poetry ===
Joris published over 30 books and chapbooks of his own poetry, among these:

- Interglacial Narrows (Poems 1915-2021), Contra Mundum Press, 2023.
- Meditations on the Stations of Mansur al-Hallaj, translated into Arabic by Safaa Fathy (Cairo, 2022).
- Fox-trails, -tales & -trots (Poems & Proses) (Black Fountain Press, Luxembourg, 2020).
- The Book of U — Le livre des cormorant (with Nicole Peyrafitte. Editions Simoncini, Luxembourg 2017).
- An American Suite (Inpatient Press 2016).
- Gulf Od Vraku K Pohromé (Czech translation, Prague, 2016).
- Barzakh (Poems 2000-2012) (Black Widow Press 2014).
- Maquif: Poemas y ensayos (Spanish Selected, La Otra, Mexico D.F., 2014).
- Celebratory Talk-Essay on Receiving the Batty Weber Award (CNL, Literary Talks series 07).
- Meditations on the Stations of Mansur al-Hallaj (Chax Press, 2013).
- The Gulf (between you and me) (The Crossing, 2013).
- learn the shadow (unit4art, 2012)
- Canto Diurno #4: The Tang Extending from the Blade (ebook; 2010).
- Aljibar II (PHI, 2008), again a bilingual edition with French translations by Eric Sarner.
- Aljibar (PHI, 2007), a bilingual edition with French translations by Eric Sarner.
- Routes, not Roots (Audio CD, 2007).
- Meditations on the Stations of Mansur Al-Hallaj 1-20 (Chax Press, 2006).
- The Rothenberg Variations (2004).
- Fin de siècle-Phantombild; Ausgewählte Gedichte 1974-2000 (PHI, 2004).
- Permanent Diaspora (2003)
- Poasis: Selected Poems 1986-1999 (Wesleyan University Press, 2001).
- h.j.r. (EarthWind Press, Ann Arbor, 1999).
- out/takes (1999)
- La dernière traversée de la manche (PHI, 1995)
- Winnetou Old (Meow Press, Buffalo, NY, 1994).
- Turbulence (St. Lazaire Press, Rhinebeck, 1991).
- The Irritation Ditch (1991).
- Janus (St. Lazaire Press, 1988).
- Breccia: Selected Poems 1972-1986 (Editions PHI / Station Hill, 1987).
- Net/Work (1983).
- The Book of Luap Nalec (1982).
- make it up like say (1982).
- Tracing (1982).
- The Broken Glass (1980).
- Old Dog High Q (1980).
- Body Count (1979).
- The Tassili Connection (1978).
- Tanith Flies (1978).
- Hearth-Work (1977).
- Antlers I-XI (1975).
- A Single-minded Bestiary (1974; online reissue 2015).
- Trance/Mutations (1972).
- The Fifth Season (1971).

=== Prose ===
- Always the Many, Never the One: Conversations In-between, with Florent Toniello (CMP 2022).
- Arabia (Not So) Deserta (Essays on Maghrebi & Mashreqi Writing & Culture)Spuyten Duyvil 2019.
- Adonis & Pierre Joris: Conversations in the Pyrenees, CMP 2019.
- The Agony of I.B. (Theater, 2016).
- Justifying the Margins: Essays 1990-2006 (Salt Publishing) 2009.
- A Nomad Poetics (Wesleyan University Press) 2003.
- Global Interference (1981).
- The Book of Demons (with Victoria Hyatt, as Joseph W. Charles) (1975).
- The Entropy Caper (radio play 1973).
- Another Journey (1972).

Forthcoming:

- Diwans of Exile: A Pierre Joris Reader (CMP 2024).
- Against Tyranny: Selected Essays 1972-2018 (2024).
- Paul Celan's Todesfuge / Deathfugue (Small Orange Import 2023).

=== Translations ===
- Rues du monde / Streets of the World by Anne Waldmann, translated by Pierre Joris and Nicole Peyrafitte with Eline Marx (Editions Apic, Algiers October 2023).
- Memory Rose into Threshold Speech: The Collected Earlier Poetry of Paul Celan (Farrar, Straus & Giroux, 2020).
- Paul Celan, Microliths They Are, Little Stones (Posthumous prose) (Contra Mundum Press, 2020).
- Revolution goes through Walls, by Safaa Fathy (SplitLevel Texts 2018).
- Breathturn into Timestead: The Collected Later Poetry of Paul Celan (Farrar, Straus & Giroux, 2015)
- Exile is my Trade. A Habib Tengour Reader (Black Widow Press, 2012).
- Paul Celan. The Meridian. Final Version—Drafts—Materials (Stanford University Press, 2011).
- Jukebox hydrogène de Allen Ginsberg (avec Nicole Peyrafitte 2008).
- Paul Celan: Selections (2005).
- Lightduress by Paul Celan (2005).
- The Burial of the Count of Orgaz and other Writings of Pablo Picasso (2004).
- The Malady of Islam by Abdelwahab Meddeb (2003).
- 4x1: Translations of Tristan Tzara, Rilke, Jean-Pierre Duprey and Habib Tengour (Inconundrum Press, 2002).
- Threadsuns by Paul Celan (2000)
- Crystals to Aden by Michel Bulteau (2000)
- Habib Tengour: Empedokles's Sandal (Duration Press, 1999).
- Breathturn by Paul Celan (1995)
- pppppp: The Selected Writings of Kurt Schwitters (1993)
- From the Desert to the Book, Interviews with Edmond Jabès (1989)
- The Unavowable Community by Maurice Blanchot (1988)
- Lune faucon de Sam Shepard (1987)
- Horse's Neck de Pete Townshend (1986)
- Motel Chronicles de Sam Shepard (1985)
- Sentiments éligiaques américains de Gregory Corso (1977)
- Mexico City Blues de Jack Kerouac (1977)
- Temporal Flight by Jean-Pierre Duprey (1976)
- Chants de la Révolution de Julian Beck (1975)
- Contretemps à temps de Carl Solomon (1974)

Also noteworthy are his translations of Maurice Blanchot's The Unavowable Community and Edmond Jabès's From the Desert to the Book (Station Hill Press). As well as his numerous translations from English into French: Jack Kerouac's Mexico City Blues, but also Carl Solomon, Gregory Corso, Pete Townshend, Julian Beck, Sam Shepard and most recently "Hydrogen Jukebox" by Allen Ginsberg (Libretto for 2009 French premiere of Philip Glass' opera "Hydrogen Jukebox").

Miscellaneous:

- In 2007 his CD Routes, Not Roots appeared, with Munir Beken (oud), Michael Bisio (bass), Ben Chadabe (percussion) & Mitch Elrod (guitar).

=== Translations of Paul Celan ===
Joris has translated almost all of the poetry of Paul Celan, except for the very early and posthumously published poems, from German into English. These included the first three volumes published by Green Integer, a "Selections" edition of Celan, and his "Meridian" speech:

- Lightduress (received the 2005 PEN Award for Poetry in Translation)
- Threadsuns
- Breathturn
- Paul Celan: Selections
- The Meridian: Final Version - Drafts - Materials
- Breathturn into Time-stead: The Complete Later Poetry of Paul Celan
- Memory Rose into Threshold Speech: The Collected Earlier Poetry.

=== Anthologies ===
- The University of California Book of North African Literature (vol. 4 in the Poems for the Millennium series), coedited with Habib Tengour (UCP, November 2012).
- Poems for the Millennium (2 volumes: 1995 and 1998)
- Joy! Praise! A Festschrift for Jerome Rothenberg (1991)
- Poésie Internationale : Anthologie (with Jean Portante, 1987)
- Joris's first anthology was the bi-lingual Matières d'Angleterre. Anthologie de la nouvelle poésie anglaise, co-edited with Paul Buck (Les Trois Cailloux, 1984).

=== Edited Books ===
- A City Full of Voices: Essays on Robert Kelly, ed. by Pierre Joris with Peter Cockelbergh & Joel Newberger (Contra Mundum Press 2020).
- A Voice Full of Cities: The Collected Essays of Robert Kelly, ed. by Pierre Joris & Peter Cockelbergh (Contra Mundum Press 2013).
- Claude Pélieu: La Crevaille (Posthumous Writings of Claude Pélieu, transcribed & edited by Pierre Joris) Ressacs, Editions de l'Arganier, Paris (2008).
- Paul Celan : Selections, Poets for the Millennium series, University of California Press 2005.
- The Burial of the Count of Orgaz and other Writings of Pablo Picasso (with Jerome Rothenberg), Exact Change, Boston, 2004.
- pppppp : The Selected Writings of Kurt Schwitters (with Jerome Rothenberg), Temple University Press, 1993. Re-issued by Exact Change in 2002.
- Joy! Praise! A Festschrift for Jerome Rothenberg on the Occasion of his Sixtieth Birthday, Ta'wil Books & Documents, Encinitas, 1991.

=== Collaborations with Jerome Rothenberg ===
With Jerome Rothenberg he has published a two-volume anthology of 20th Century Avant-Garde writings, Poems for the Millennium: The University of California Book of Modern & Postmodern Poetry, (University of California Press) the first volume of which received the 1996 PEN Oakland/Josephine Miles Literary Award.

Rothenberg's & Joris's previous collaboration, pppppp: Selected Writings of Kurt Schwitters (Temple University Press, 1993, reissued in 2002 by Exact Change) was awarded the 1994 PEN Center USA West Literary Award for Translation.

Rothenberg & Joris also co-edited & co-translated The Burial of the Count of Orgaz & Other Writings of Pablo Picasso (Exact Change, 2004).

=== Performance art, theater, and collaborations ===
Joris's work with his wife, performance artist Nicole Peyrafitte includes:

- dePLACEments (premiered from 27 June to 2 July 2005 at Cave Poésie, Toulouse, France);
- Manifesto&a (premiered in Luxembourg, July 1998);
- Riding The Lines, (European Tour summer 1997; New York City performance at the Here Inn, Dec 1997).

Other performances include:

- Domopoetics, a multimedia collaborative performance with Nicole Peyrafitte (since 2011).
- Pierre's Words (Toward an Opera), a collaboration with composer Joel Chadabe & the Ellen Sinopoli Dance Company (Premiered May 3, 1997, The Egg, Albany);
- Frozen Shadows, a dance & reading performance based on Winnetou Old, choreographed by Ellen Sinopoli & danced by the Ellen Sinopoli Dance Company (Union College, Schenectady, NY January 21, 1996 "The Egg," Albany, NY, April 12 & 13, 1995);
- This Morning (part of Music Juggle) a multimedia collaboration with composer Xavier Chabot (Premiered at Rensselaer Polytechnic Institute, Troy, NY February 5, 1997. Chabot presented this work in Japan in late 1997.
- Joris's play The Agony of I.B., was commissioned and produced in June 2016 by the Théatre National du Luxembourg. It also had a staged reading at Torn Page in New York on 8 February 2020.

=== On Pierre Joris ===
An issue of Samizdat commemorates the Joris/Rothenberg collaboration with original work and translations by both poets, and essays and poems for and about the poets.

In 2011, Peter Cockelbergh edited a book on Joris entitled Pierre Joris--Cartographies of the In-between with essays by, among others, Mohammed Bennis, Charles Bernstein, Nicole Brossard, Clayton Eshleman, Allen Fisher, Christine Hume, Robert Kelly, Regina Keil-Sagawe, Abdelwahab Meddeb, Jennifer Moxley, Carrie Noland, Alice Notley, Marjorie Perloff & Nicole Peyrafitte (Litteraria Pragensia, Charles University, Prague, 2011).

Samizdat # 7, edited by Robert Archambeau (winter 2001): Rothenberg and Joris: Poets for the Millennium.

Oasis #18 (published by Ian Robinson, London, 197?); new poems by PJ. Essays on P.J. by Eric Mottram, Clayton Eshleman, Robert Kelly. Interview of P.J. by Allen Fisher.

=== Pierre Joris in translation ===
- Canto Diurno — Choix de poèmes 1972-2014. Avant-dire de Charles Bernstein. Traduit de l'anglais par Jean Portante avec Glenda George, Michel Maire, Didier Pemerle et la collaboration de l'auteur. (Le Castor Astral 2017).
- Mawqif — Poemas y ensayos. Traducción y notas de Mario Domínguez Parra y Joseph Mulligan (Collection Temblor de cielo. LaOtra, Durango, Mexico, 2014).
- Fin de siècle-Phantombild — Ausgewählte Gedichte 1974-2000. Aus dem Amerikanischen Englisch von Nico Helminger. Mit Illustrationen von Nicole Peyrafitte. (Editions PHI, 2004).

== Personal life ==
He lived in Bay Ridge, Brooklyn, New York, with his wife, multimedia performance artist and writer Nicole Peyrafitte. He had two sons, film director and writer Miles Joris-Peyrafitte and film producer Joseph Mastantuono.
