= Miles Joris-Peyrafitte =

American filmmaker (born 1992)

Miles Joris-Peyrafitte (born September 1992) is an American filmmaker. He directed the feature films As You Are (2016), Dreamland (2019) and The Good Mother (2023).

== Biography ==
He grew up in Albany, New York. In October 2015, he was residing in Hudson, New York. As of August 2023, he resides in Brooklyn.

His parents are Pierre Joris and Nicole Peyrafitte. As of September 2026, he is engaged to Kelsey Asbille.

== Filmography ==
- As You Are (2016)
- Dreamland (2019)
- The Good Mother (2023)
