= Bad Bridget =

2023 history book

Bad Bridget: Crime, Mayhem, and the Lives of Irish Emigrant Women
- Authors: Elaine Farrell, Leanne Cormick
- Language: English
- Published: 2023
- Publisher: Penguin Books
- Publication place: United Kingdom

Bad Bridget: Crime, Mayhem and the Lives of Irish Emigrant Women is a history book written by Elaine Farrell and Leanne McCormick, based on their research project of the same name. Farrell is a Professor in the School of History, Anthropology, Philosophy and Politics at Queen's University Belfast, and McCormick is a Professor of Modern History at Ulster University.

The Bad Bridget book was first published as a paperback and an e-book in 2023, with the mass paperback version being released in January 2024. It was published by Penguin Books and was awarded the Irish Waterstones book of the month on its release to the mass market.

The book explores the lives of real Irish women and girls that immigrated to North America in the nineteenth and early twentieth century, and it was inspired by the authors' research project which started in 2015, funded by the Arts and Humanities Research Council. Their research project led to a podcast release in 2020, and a museum exhibition in 2022 at the Ulster American Folk Park.

== Overview ==
Bad Bridget was published as a non-fiction book by Penguin. The paperback version contains 336 pages, with over 50 pages of references from the authors' extensive research.

The book begins with an introduction to Irish emigration in the nineteenth and early twentieth centuries, when at least 7.5 million people emigrated from Ireland, with one in two of these being female between the years 1845 and 1885.

The authors gave some background to the Bad Bridget project, in which they spent years reviewing archives and historical records across New York, Boston, and Toronto. The project was called Bad Bridget as the name "Bridget" or "Biddy" was often used to describe the stereotypical Irish female emigrant, whilst the name was also synonymous with St. Bridget of Ireland, the female patron saint of Ireland. It is used as a collective term to describe the women in this book.

Research showed that during this time, Irish women frequently outnumbered Irish men in prison. The book explores the story of real Irish women during this time, along with their criminal backgrounds, with many women appearing in court multiple times.

Real-life court cases are recounted in the ten chapters of the book, including Irish women accused and arrested for prostitution, theft, drunkenness, stubbornness, adultery, kidnapping, manslaughter, and murder. It also explores the cultural landscape at the time, and explores issues such as abortion, pregnancy out of wedlock, poverty, race, and how Irish women were treated by wider society at the time. The book also features extracts from newspaper articles at the time, including the New York Times, the New York Herald, and the Toronto Globe, along with prison mugshots for some of the women featured. Each chapter is themed around a different type of crime, with a main case study reference.

The book reveals that alcohol-related offences were the most common cause of conviction and highlights a Saturday in the Toronto police court in May 1865, where 11 women ranging in age from 20 to 85 are sent to prison. The story of notorious criminals are told, such as Margaret Brown or 'Old Mother Hubbard', a notorious pick-pocket in her 80s, the serial bigamist Bridget McCool and the serial killer Lizzie Halliday—described by the New York Times as the "worst woman on earth". Sarah Jane Robinson's account is also told, charged with the death sentence for poisoning, and tells how a petition of over 500 leading citizens led to her sentence being changed to solitary life imprisonment. Mary Farmer's crime is also relayed, sentenced to execution for her role in the infamous 'trunk murder case'.

== Reception ==
Upon its release in paperback, Bad Bridget was awarded the Irish Waterstones book of the month, January 2024. It was also named RTÉ book of the week in February 2023, who commented: "Bad Bridget serves as an accessible, fascinating, and emotional way to learn about the Irish women who left our shores in search of a better life. . . but never found one".

The Women's History Association of Ireland also reviewed the book, saying: "This is a valuable work of social history that offers a vibrant reconstruction of a familiar terrain—Irish immigration to North America—from a fresh and enlightening perspective, that of Irish female criminals".

The book was also reviewed by the journal Irish Economic and Social History: "It is based on an impressive research foundation, especially archival material such as court, prison, reformatory and charity records as well as numerous contemporary newspaper reports".

The Sunday Independent described the book as: "A fascinating account of an aspect of the diaspora that is rarely given attention... Farrell and McCormick have created a captivating account of lives previously ignored". The Irish Examiner stated: "An important, impeccably researched though eminently readable book that charts new territory... this could yet be the book of 2023". Ryan Tubridy also claimed: "I just loved it... this is a book that will enrich any bookshelf around the country". The Irish Times also reviewed the book as: "The emigration story we mostly tell ourselves is a bright, shiny one to which Bad Bridget now adds invaluable collective shading".

== Film adaptation ==
In early 2025, it was announced that director Rich Peppiatt and producer Trevor Birney have optioned the book rights for a Bad Bridget film. In October 2025, Daisy Edgar-Jones and Emilia Jones, both privately educated British actors, were selected to portray impoverished Irish women in the film, with the production now titled Bad Bridgets. Production designer James Price and costume designer Kate Hawley are also involved, along with LuckyChap Entertainment producing. Filming is planned for a spring 2026 date in Ireland. Netflix acquired worldwide rights to the project, with Alison Oliver replacing Edgar-Jones due to scheduling conflicts.
