= Tom Ackerley =

British film producer (born 1990)

- Born: Thomas Francis Michael Ackerley; 13 June 1990 (age 36); Surrey, England
- Occupations: Producer; actor; assistant director
- Years active: 2001–present
- Organisation: LuckyChap Entertainment
- Spouse: Margot Robbie (m. 2016)
- Children: 1

Thomas Francis Michael Ackerley (born 13 June 1990) is an English producer, former actor, and former assistant director. He co-founded the production company LuckyChap Entertainment with his wife Margot Robbie. Together they have produced several films such as I, Tonya (2017), Terminal (2018), Promising Young Woman (2020), Barbie (2023), My Old Ass (2024), and Borderline (2025). For Barbie, he received a nomination for the Academy Award for Best Picture at the 96th Academy Awards. Ackerley also served as an executive producer on Saltburn (2023) and Wuthering Heights (2026), both directed by Emerald Fennell.

== Early life ==
Ackerley was born the youngest of three boys (with two brothers) in June, 1990 in Surrey. He attended St George's College, Weybridge, before moving to Godalming College.

== Career ==
Ackerley began his film career as an extra in the first three installments of the Harry Potter film series. After taking a break from films, he returned to the industry as a production runner for films such as Gambit (2012) and Rush (2013). From 2012 till 2016, he also worked as an assistant director for various television series and films, including Pride, Suite Française, The Two Faces of January (all released in 2014) and Macbeth (2015).

In 2014, Ackerley and his future wife Margot Robbie, alongside friends Sophia Kerr and Josey McNamara, co-founded the production company LuckyChap Entertainment. The company has produced films including I, Tonya (2017), Promising Young Woman (2020) and Barbie (2023).

== Personal life ==
Ackerley met Australian actress Margot Robbie on the set of Suite Française in 2013, the two began dating the following year. They married in a private ceremony in Byron Bay, New South Wales, in December 2016. In August 2024, the couple revealed that they were expecting their first child, and Robbie gave birth to a son. As of 2025, they live in Los Angeles.

== Filmography ==
Year	Title	Role	Notes
2001	Harry Potter and the Philosopher's Stone	Student	Extra
2002	Harry Potter and the Chamber of Secrets	Student	Extra
2004	Harry Potter and the Prisoner of Azkaban	Student	Extra
2011	The Hour	Floor runner	4 episodes
2011	Tinker Tailor Soldier Spy	Crowdrunner	
2011	Big Fat Gypsy Gangster	Floor runner	
2012	Now Is Good	Floor runner	
2012	Playhouse Presents	Third assistant director	Episode: "King of the Teds"
2012	Gambit	Floor runner	
2013	Trance	Set production assistant	
2013	Rush	Runner: daily crew	
2013	The Last Days on Mars	Third assistant director	
2013	The Borderlands	First assistant director	
2014	The Two Faces of January	Third assistant director	
2014	Da Vinci's Demons	Third assistant director	2 episodes
2014	Pride	Third assistant director	
2014	Everly	Second assistant director	
2015	Suite Française	Third assistant director	
2015	American Odyssey	Third assistant director	Footage shot in Morocco
2015	Yussef is Complicated	Third assistant director	Short film
2015	Spooks: The Greater Good	Third assistant director	
2015	Macbeth	Additional third assistant director	
2016	Grimsby	Second assistant director	
2017	I, Tonya	Producer	
2018	Terminal	Producer	
2019	Dreamland	Producer	
2020	Promising Young Woman	Producer	
2021	The Humming of the Beast	Producer	Short film
2021	Maid	Executive producer	Miniseries
2022	Mike	Executive producer	Miniseries
2023	Barbie	Producer	
2023	Boston Strangler	Producer	
2023	Saltburn	Executive producer	
2024	My Old Ass	Producer	
2025	Borderline	Producer	
2026	Wuthering Heights	Producer	
2026	Everybody Wants to Fuck Me	Producer	
2027	Untitled Ocean's Eleven prequel	Producer	
TBA	Big Thunder Mountain Railroad	Producer	
TBA	Nasty	Producer	
