= Hillside Drive =

- Directed by: Lenny Abrahamson
- Written by: Lenny Abrahamson
- Produced by: Ed Guiney; Andrew Lowe; Catherine Magee; Lenny Abrahamson
- Starring: Tom Burke; Eve Hewson; Shane Meagher
- Cinematography: Suzie Lavelle
- Edited by: Nathan Nugent
- Music by: Stephen Rennicks
- Production companies: Film4; Element Pictures; High Frequency Entertainment; Screen Ireland; RTÉ
- Distributed by: A24 (United States)
- Countries: Ireland; United Kingdom; United States
- Language: English

Hillside Drive is an upcoming coming-of-age drama film written and directed by Lenny Abrahamson.

== Premise ==
Set within Dublin’s Jewish community in the late 1970s, the film is a lyrical and emotionally resonant portrait of Davey (Meagher), a 12-year-old boy on the edge of change, navigating the anxieties of adolescence alongside the evolving dynamics of his parents’ marriage.

== Cast ==
- Tom Burke
- Eve Hewson
- Shane Meagher as Davey

== Production ==
In February 2026, Lenny Abrahamson announced that he would write and direct an Ireland-based family drama. Tom Burke and Eve Hewson were cast as a married couple, with Shane Meagher playing their son.

Filming began in March 2026 in Dublin and Wicklow under the title Hillside Drive. That month, scenes were filmed at Trinity College Dublin.
