= Atemwende =

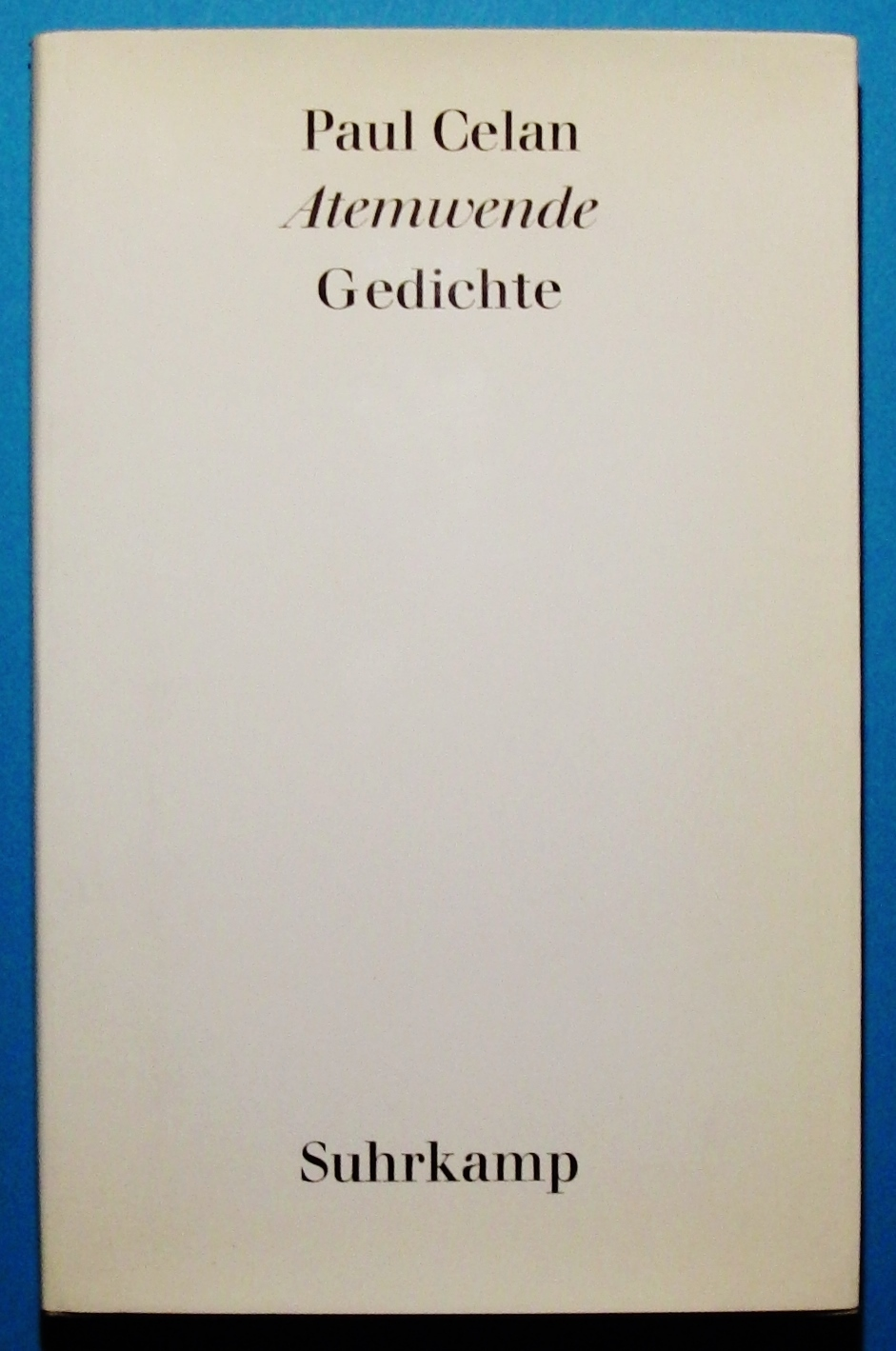
- First edition (Suhrkamp Verlag, 1967)
- Author: Paul Celan
- Translator: Pierre Joris (English)
- Language: German
- Publisher: Suhrkamp Verlag
- Publication date: 1967
- English publication date: 1995
- Pages: 103

Atemwende (translated into English as Breathturn) is a 1967 German-language poetry collection by Paul Celan. It was originally published in English by Sun & Moon Press in 1995, then republished in 2006 when Sun & Moon Press became Green Integer.

== Reception ==
The book was reviewed in Publishers Weekly in 1995: "[Pierre] Joris's translations (on pages facing the German text) capture much of the multilingual resonance, subtlety and compressed power of Celan's brilliant, difficult work, which has absorbed the interest of such critics as George Steiner and Jacques Derrida."
