= List of senators of Haute-Garonne =

Location of Haute-Garonne in France

The following is a list of senators of Haute-Garonne, people who have represented the department of Haute-Garonne in the Senate of France.

== Third Republic ==
Senators for Haute-Garonne under the French Third Republic were:

- Gabriel Lacoste de Belcastel (1876–1879)
- Joseph Pourcet (1876–1879)
- Jean-François Sacaze (1876–1879)
- Adrien Hébrard (1879–1897)
- Paul de Rémusat (1879–1897)
- Victor Camparan (1879–1906)
- Louis Féral (1886–1889)
- Jean Antoine Ernest Constans (1889–1906)
- Valentin Abeille (1897–1902)
- Camille Ournac (1897–1920)
- Victor Bougues (1902–1907)
- Edmond Caze (1906–1907)
- Raymond Leygues (1906–1920)
- Jean Bepmale (1907–1920)
- Honoré Leygues (1907–1924)
- Jean Cruppi (1920–1924)
- Raymond Blaignan (1920–1933)
- Fabien Duchein de 1920–1933)
- Jean-Marie Saint-Martin (1924–1928)
- Paul Feuga (1924–1933)
- Simon Savignol (1928–1938)
- Eugène Rouart (1933–1936)
- Lucien Saint (1933–1938)
- Bertrand Carrère (1933–1941)
- Jean-Baptiste Amat (1936–1941)
- Eugène Azémar (1938–1940)
- Ernest Beluel (1938–1941)

== Fourth Republic ==
Senators for Haute-Garonne under the French Fourth Republic were:

- Pierre Prévost (1946–1948)
- André Hauriou (1946–1955)
- Pierre Marty (1948–1958)
- André Méric (1948–1959)
- Charles Suran (1955–1959)

== Fifth Republic ==
Senators for Haute-Garonne under the French Fifth Republic:

In office	Name	Group	Notes
1959–1971	Léon Messaud	Socialiste	
1959–1971	Charles Suran	Socialiste	Died in office 1 August 1971
1959–1988	André Méric	Socialiste	Until 29 July 1988 (named to cabinet)
1971	André Servat	none	From 2 August 1971 in place of Charles Suran
1971–1974	Marcel Cavaillé	Républicains et Indépendants	Until 9 July 1974 (named to cabinet)
1971–1989	Léon Eeckhoutte	Socialiste	
1974–1980	Eugène Bonnet	Union des Républicains et des Indépendants	From 9 July 1974 in place of Marcel Cavaillé
1980–1998	Jean Peyrafitte	Socialiste	
1980–2008	Gérard Roujas	Socialiste	
1988–1989	Eugène Boyer	Socialiste	From 29 July 1988 in place of André Méric
1989–1996	Claude Cornac	Socialiste	Died in office 12 January 1996
1989–2008	Maryse Bergé-Lavigne	Socialiste	
1996–1998	Guy Lèguevaques	Socialiste	From 13 January 1996 in place of Claude Cornac
1998–2014	Bertrand Auban	Socialiste et apparentés	
1998–2014	Jean-Pierre Plancade	Rassemblement Démocratique et Social Européen	
2008–2014	Jean-Jacques Mirassou	Socialiste et apparentés	
2008–present	Alain Chatillon	Les Républicains	
2014–present	Pierre Médevielle	Union Centriste	
2014–present	Brigitte Micouleau	Les Républicains	
2014–present	Claude Raynal	Socialiste et républicain	
2008–present	Françoise Laborde	Rassemblement Démocratique et Social Européen	

== Sources ==
- Liste des anciens sénateurs de la IIIème République par circonscription (in French), Sénat de France
- Liste des anciens sénateurs de la IVème République par circonscription (in French), Sénat de France
- Liste des anciens sénateurs de la Vème République par circonscription (in French), Sénat de France
- Liste par département – Haute-Garonne (in French), Sénat de France
