= Safaa Fathy =

Egyptian writer and documentary filmmaker

- صفاء فتحي
- Born: July 17, 1958 (age 67); Minya, Egypt
- Occupations: Poet, documentary filmmaker, playwright and essayist
- Website: http://safaafathy.org/en/

Safaa Fathy (born July 17, 1958) is an Egyptian poet, documentary filmmaker, playwright, and essayist. She is best known for her film Derrida's Elsewhere, a documentary that focuses on the life and concepts of controversial philosopher Jacques Derrida.

== Early life and career ==
Fathy was born in Minya, Upper Egypt, on July 17, 1958. She studied English literature in Cairo. Fathy participated in the student movement while in Egypt but later left the country and settled in Paris in 1981. In 1987, she was an assistant director at the Deutsches Theater located in East Berlin. Fathy worked with Heiner Muller in 1990. She completed her doctoral thesis at the Sorbonne in 1993; her thesis was on Bertolt Brecht. Before becoming a filmmaker, Fathy worked as a stage director.

Currently she serves as director of programme at the International College of Philosophy in Paris.

In an interview that explores how Fathy uses film editing to construct her narrative, examining her choices in pacing, juxtaposition, and the use of archival footage or other visual elements, "Cutting" may also refer to the way Fathy confronts historical trauma and the fragmentation of memory.

== Selected works ==
=== Poetry ===
==== Collections ====
- Revolution goes through walls, collection in Arabic, also published in English and French translations
- A name to the sea
- Al Haschiche (ISBN 9789689246138, a book of poetry accompanied by film-poem, Hidden Valley) bilingual Spanish-French, Ediciones sin nombre, Mexico; English-language edition, Pamenar Press.
- …où ne pas naître, bilingual collection in Arabic and French
- Little Wooden Dolls
- حيث لا نولد, published in a bilingual Arabic-English edition as Where Not to Be Born (Litmus Press, 2024)

==== In collective volumes ====
- Ma langue est mon territoire, Collection Folies d’encre, Eden, Paris
- Anthology of Contemporary Arab Women Poets

=== Theatre ===
Ordalie; Terreur (2004, ISBN 9782872823796)

=== Books ===
- Tourner les mots with Jacques Derrida
  - The book is about Derrida and Fathy's experience with film in general and their collaboration on Fathy's 1999 film D'Ailleurs, Derrida, released in English as Derrida's Elsewhere. "Contre-jour", the introduction is presented as a dialogue between the two authors, where they discuss the making of the film and reflect on the nature of cinema and language. They describe the film as a "short film in two voices," with each voice playing its own part and speaking for itself. They also acknowledge that their cooperation was not always harmonious, with disagreements and tensions arising during the filmmaking process. One of the key themes explored in "Contre-jour" is the relationship between cinema and language. Derrida and Fathy discuss the challenges of translating the visual language of film into words. They argue that words are often inadequate to capture the full meaning of images, as they are "immobilized" and "kept at the point of departure," while images move at an "incommensurate speed." They suggest that the "untranslatable" nature of film is one of its defining characteristics, and that this untranslatability should be embraced rather than feared.

=== Essays and other writings ===
==== On philosophy and politics ====
- L’aporie of lui in Derrida à Coimbra. Palimage Editores, Coimbra, Portugal. 2006
- Un(e) spectre nommé(e) « avenir » in Cahiers de l’Herne on Jacques Derrida. 2005
- Derrida, metteur en scène ou acteur Magazine Littéraire, N° 430. 2004
- Transparence du Halal, transgression du Haram Vacarme, 2002

==== On poetry, theatre, cinema ====
- hôra/Luz y desierto. Revelación de lo oscuro (Spanish, 2010)
- Hisser les voiles: Odyssée féminine à travers la Méditerranée. Microfisuras, 1999*
- Dissidences et dissonances. Cartographie d'une poésie égyptienne. Almadraba (revue), Seville. 1998
- Exil, in Pour Rushdie, La Découverte, Paris. 1993

== Selected filmography ==
=== Documentary ===
- Mohammad sauvé des eaux (Mohammad Saved from the Waters), TS production, Paris
- Dardasha Socotra, UNESCO, government of Yemen.
- D'ailleurs, Derrida, Arte, France
- Maxime Rodinson : l'Athée des Dieux (Maxime Rodinson, Atheist of the Gods), France
- Ghazeia, danseuses d'Egypte (Ghazeia, Egyptian Dancers), Canal plus, France
- Hidden Faces

=== Fiction ===
- Nom à la mer, film-poem, text Safaa Fathy, read by Jacques Derrida
- Silence, short fiction, Mention spéciale du Jury, Rencontres de Digne-les-Bains 1997, prime à la qualité CNC
- Doisneau
