= Die Niemandsrose =

1963 poetry collection by Paul Celan

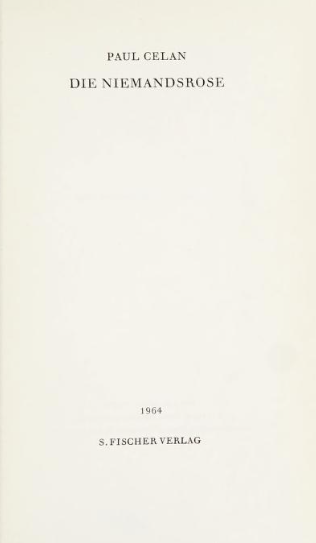
- Title page for Die Niemandsrose (1964)
- Author: Paul Celan
- Translators: Michael Hamburger (English), John Felstiner (English), Nikolai Popov & Heather McHugh (English), Pierre Joris (English)
- Language: German
- Publisher: S. Fischer Verlag
- Publication date: 1963
- Pages: 95

Die Niemandsrose (The No-One's Rose) is a 1963 German-language poetry collection by Paul Celan, dedicated to the memory of Osip Mandelstam.

The publication of Die Niemandsrose consolidated Celan's reputation among the most important contemporary poets writing in German. It is included in the first volume of Celan's Gesammelte Werke (Collected Works).

== Contents ==
The poems in the collection are divided into four numbered, untitled sections.

I

- Es war Erde in ihnen
- Das Wort vom Zur-Tiefe-Gehn
- Bei Wein und Verlorenheit
- Zürich, Zum Storchen
- Selbdritt, selbviert
- Soviel Gestirne
- Dein Hinübersein
- Zu beiden Händen
- Zwölf Jahre
- Mit allen Gedanken
- Die Schleuse
- Stumme Herbstgerüche
- Eis, Eden
- Psalm
- Tübingen, Jänner
- Chymisch
- Eine Gauner- und Ganovenweise

II

- Flimmerbaum
- Erratisch
- Einiges Handähnliche
- ... rauscht der Brunnen
- Es ist nicht mehr
- Radix, Matrix
- Schwarzerde
- Einem, der vor der Tür stand
- Mandorla
- An niemand geschmiegt
- Zweihäusig, Ewiger
- Sibirisch
- Benedicta
- Á la pointe acérée

III

- Die hellen Steine
- Anabasis
- Ein Wurfholz
- Hawdalah
- Le Menhir
- Nachmittag mit Zirkus und Zitadelle
- Bei Tag
- Kermorvan
- Ich habe Bambus geschnitten
- Kolon

IV

- Was geschah?
- In eins
- Hinausgekrönt
- Wohin mir das Wort
- Les Globes
- Huhediblu
- Hüttenfenster
- Die Silbe Schmerz
- La Contrescarpe
- Es ist alles anders
- Und mit dem Buch aus Tarussa
- In der Luft

== Reception and Translation ==
In 2020, Pierre Joris published the first complete English translation of Die Niemandsrose in his Memory Rose into Threshold Speech: The Collected Earlier Poetry of Paul Celan, a bilingual edition which features complete translations of Celan's first four poetry collections, accompanied by Joris' commentary. Joris had previously published translations of a selection of poems from Die Niemandsrose in his Paul Celan: Selections for the University of California Press' Poets for the Millennium series.

Prior to Joris' complete translation, a number of other translators had published selections from this collection.

From 1967, Michael Hamburger began translating Celan's poetry into English, a project he would continue through five decades. Hamburger's early translations, including selections from Die Niemandsrose, were initially published in various journals of poetry, and first collected in 1972 in his Nineteen Poems by Paul Celan. That same year, Hamburger produced further translations from Die Niemandsrose in his Paul Celan: Selected Poems. Hamburger published an expanded set of translations from Die Niemandsrose in his 1980 Paul Celan: Poems: a Bilingual Edition, with the original German texts and his English translations on facing pages. He expanded this set of facing-page translations further in his 1988 Poems of Paul Celan, noting in his introduction that two pairs of co-translators had also published selections from Celan in the interim. Hamburger continued his project, expanding his translations from Die Niemandsrose again in 2002, and finally in 2007.

John Felstiner included translations of brief excerpts from Die Niemandsrose in his biography Paul Celan: Poet, Survivor, Jew, where he describes Celan's work in this collection as "a Jacob's struggle with the German lexicon." In 2001, Felstiner published translations of a thirty-two poems from the collection in his Selected Poems and Prose of Paul Celan.

Nikolai Popov and Heather McHugh jointly translated selections from Die Niemandsrose in their Glottal Stop: 101 Poems by Paul Celan, which won a 2001 Griffin Prize.
