= As You Are (film) =

2016 film

- Theatrical release poster
- Directed by: Miles Joris-Peyrafitte
- Written by: Miles Joris-Peyrafitte; Madison Harrison
- Starring: Owen Campbell; Charlie Heaton; Amandla Stenberg; Scott Cohen; John Scurti; Mary Stuart Masterson
- Cinematography: Caleb Heymann
- Edited by: Abbi Jutkowicz
- Music by: Patrick Higgins
- Release dates: January 25, 2016 (Sundance); February 24, 2017 (United States)
- Running time: 110 minutes
- Country: United States
- Language: English

As You Are is a 2016 American mystery drama film written and directed by Miles Joris-Peyrafitte in his feature directorial debut, and co-written Madison Harrison. The film stars Owen Campbell, Charlie Heaton, Amandla Stenberg, Scott Cohen, John Scurti, and Mary Stuart Masterson. Set in the early 1990s, it follows the friendship between three teenagers as a police investigation prompts disparate memories.

As You Are premiered in competition at the Sundance Film Festival on January 25, 2016, where it won the Special Jury Award. The film was theatrically released in the United States on February 24, 2017, to positive reviews from critics.

== Plot ==
Set in the 1990s, the film opens with a flashback of a battered Mark examining his wounds in the mirror before going off into the woods with his friend Jack, where a gunshot is heard. The narrative is also framed within a police investigation involving interrogations of the main characters regarding the relationship between Jack and Mark.

Months earlier, Jack's single mother, Karen, begins dating a man named Tom, who has a son Jack's age. Jack meets the son, Mark, and the two quickly become inseparable. They also befriend a local girl named Sarah when she defends them after they are assaulted by a group of thugs. The three spend all their time together, and though Mark kisses Sarah during a game of spin the bottle, the trio are platonic at first.

Tom shows his gun collection to the kids, who practice shooting in a nearby field. Soon after, Karen suggests Tom and Mark move in with her and Jack, and Tom agrees. Jack and Mark begin sharing a room and grow closer, using drugs and navigating adolescence and the tribulations of the 90s, including the suicide of their idol Kurt Cobain.

After Jack reveals to Mark that he's never kissed anyone, Mark volunteers to teach him how, and the two kiss. They later go out to the woods with some of Tom's guns and kill a squirrel. That night, Jack witnesses Tom physically abuse Mark over a trivial incident, which escalates later when he and Jack skip multiple days of school. Tensions between Tom and Karen over the raising of the boys gets worse until Karen discovers that Tom has been planning for Jack to join the Marines without her knowing, which infuriates her. During their argument, Tom walks in on Jack, Mark, and Sarah watching pornography together. Enraged, Tom becomes physically violent with Mark, and moves them both out of Karen's house. This devastates Jack, who is clearly in love with Mark.

Mark leaves the school, leaving Jack and Sarah alone. The two start to date after Sarah is stood up at prom, and together the two encounter Mark hanging out with a group of delinquents. Jack and Sarah break it off when they realize there is only platonic love between them. Mark and Jack later reunite in private, where Mark implies his feelings for Jack, and they kiss passionately.

During the interrogation, the detective attempts to get to the truth of how Mark received a head injury at the skate park. Jack maintains the story that it was a skateboarding accident, and this story is cross-examined by questioning the others, including Sarah, who is threatened with legal trouble to tell the truth about what she saw at the skate park.

In the flashback, Mark and Sarah reveal at the skate park that they have started dating each other. After Sarah walks away, Mark tells Jack that he can't handle the repercussions of their being together. A heartbroken Jack desperately attempts to reason with him, making Mark fall and hit his head on a rock in the scuffle, but Mark is not critically injured. Later, when they are alone together in Mark's room, Mark tells Jack that he doesn't remember what happened, and the two hold each other. Tom observes them through the gap in the door. In the interrogation room, Jack begins to break down emotionally as the detective aggressively accosts him for lying about the skate park, and demands to know what happened in the woods. It is revealed here that Mark is dead.

In the final flashback, Mark shows up at Jack's house with a battered face. While sharing a bottle of cough syrup, Mark rejects Jack's tenderness, and when asked why, he tells Jack that he wishes he were a girl. Jack puts on his mother's makeup and dress to try to seduce him, but Mark continues to rebuff his advances. Equipped with Mark's father's guns, the two go into the woods once more. The disoriented pair wander around the area, until a single gunshot is heard. Jack is seen running out of the woods, screaming for help. In the interrogation room, Jack brokenly asks for a lawyer. The ending is open. It is not clear if Mark shot himself or if Jack shot him.

== Cast ==
- Owen Campbell as Jack
- Charlie Heaton as Mark
- Amandla Stenberg as Sarah
- John Scurti as Detective Erickson
- Scott Cohen as Tom
- Mary Stuart Masterson as Karen

== Critical reception ==
On review aggregator Rotten Tomatoes, the film holds an approval rating of 68% based on 22 reviews, with an average rating of 6/10. On Metacritic, the film has a weighted average score of 67 out of 100, based on nine critics, indicating "generally favorable" reviews.

Critic Nick Allen reported that "Joris-Peyrafitte has an ambitious approach, sharing the progression of Mark and Jack’s bond with confident, effective pacing," that the film "settles in as a gripping epic," and that "Heymann’s cinematography is one of the film’s most immediately fascinating aspects." Writing in Variety, critic Geoff Berkshire described the film as "crafted with the confidence and skill of a veteran" and a "well-observed drama," but noted that it "is somewhat hampered by a 'True Detective'-style police interrogation and flashback structure which turn what should be natural progressions for the characters into plot twists."
