= Francesc Abad =

Spanish artist

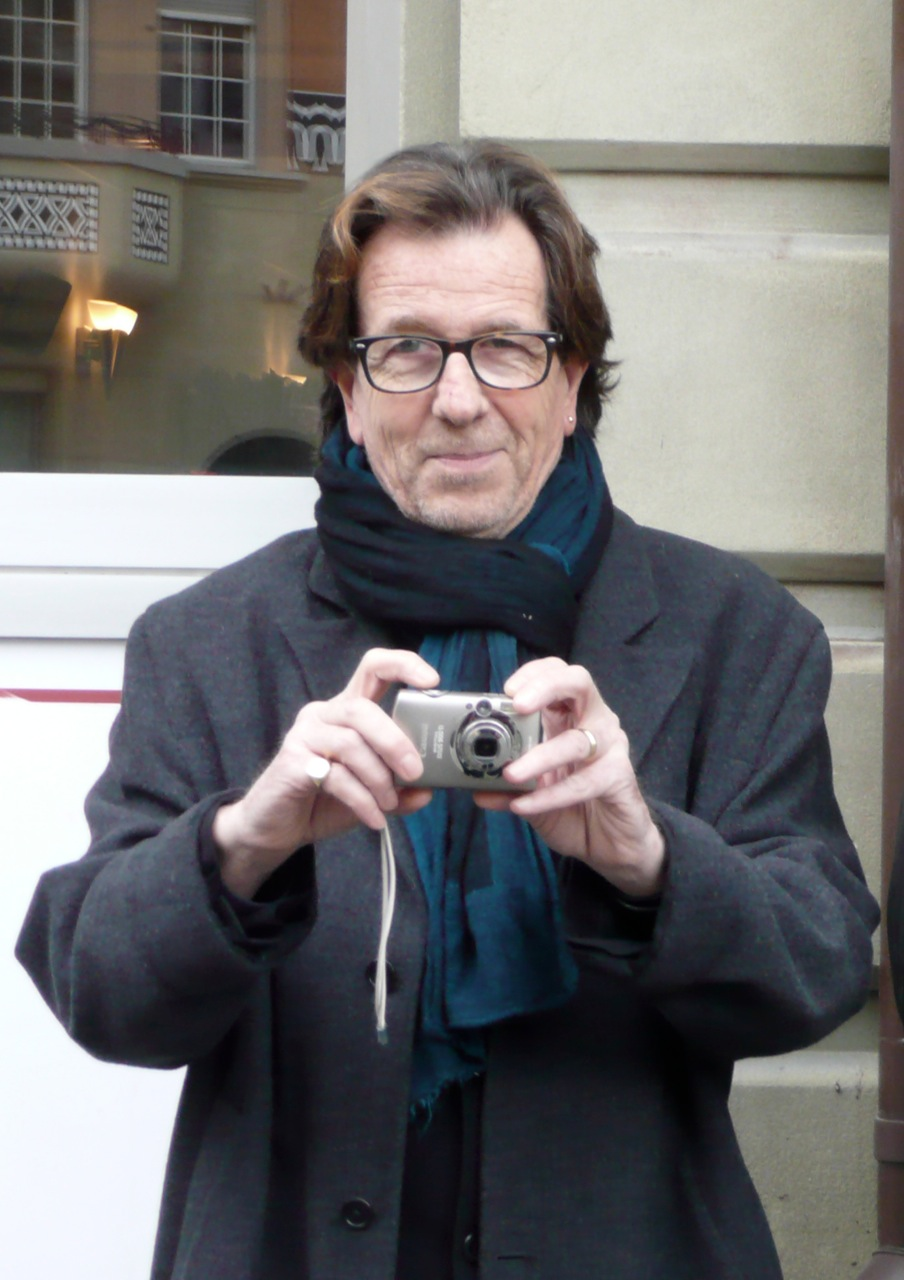
- Francesc Abad
- Born: 1944 (age 81–82); Terrassa, Catalonia, Spain
- Education: School of Arts and Crafts (Terrassa), Center for Pedagogical Documentation (Paris)
- Known for: Conceptual art, performance art, installations, multimedia art
- Notable work: El Camp de la Bota
- Movement: Conceptual art

Francesc Abad (born 1944 in Terrassa, Catalonia) is a multidisciplinary Catalan Spanish artist known for conceptual art who practiced performance (actions), and used installations (photography, video, objects, sculpture, etc), and interaction with the body, land and territory as well.

== Career ==
Abad studied at the School of Arts and Crafts in Terrassa and at the Center for Pedagogical Documentation in Paris. In 1972, he settled in New York. He entered the art world through painting, characterized by the simplification of forms and the reduction of color, before moving on to conceptual art.

In recent years, most of his art is multimedia artistic work. His exhibition on El Camp de la Bota, a project based on the events of the Camp de la Bota in Barcelona, the beach where between 1939 and 1952 the Franco regime shot at least 1704 people, stands out. Abad wanted to rescue these events from oblivion after the works of the Universal Forum of Cultures in 2004 on the grounds of such a bad memory for the people of Barcelona. The exhibition is a collection of documents and testimonies of relatives or friends of the victims, and was presented in Girona, El Prat de Llobregat, Manresa and Barcelona; on July 27, 2007, the artist donated the work to the Museum of Contemporary Art of Barcelona (MACBA).

== Exhibitions ==
- 1971 Formes Primàries, Ateneo de Madrid.
- 1977 Homenatge a l'home del carrer, Sala Tres, Sabadell. Chronicle of a situation, Amics de les Arts, Terrassa.
- 1978 Les setrilleres, Institut Industrial, Terrassa. Degradació de la Natura, Espai b5-125, Universitat Autònoma de Barcelona, Bellaterra.
- 1981 Material Humà, Metrònom, Barcelona.
- 1984 Have a good time, Canaleta Gallery, Figueres.
- 1986 Parany, Espai d'anar i tornar, Barcelona's Quantity Surveyors Association. Entropy, Muncunill Gallery, Terrassa.
- 1987 Paisatges paraŀlels, Sala Fortuny, Reus.
- 1987-1988 Dinosaures, Pertorbacions irreversibles, Fundació Caixa de Pensions de Barcelona.
- 1988 L'esperit de la utopia. Parpalló Hall, Valencia. La Torre de l'Àngel, Subject-Object, Museu d'Art Espai-83, Sabadell.
- 1989 Europa Arqueologia de Rescat. Metrònom, Barcelona. Arteleku Guipuzkoako Foru Aldundia, San Sebastian. Exhibition Hall Centro Insular de Cultura (CIC), Cabildo Insular de Gran Canaria, Las Palmas de Gran Canaria. Monastery of Veruela. Deputation of Zaragoza.
- 1990 Bildung: The image of thought, Alfonso Alcolea Gallery, Barcelona.
- 1991 La línia de Portbou, Homage to Walter Benjamin, Barcelona City Council. Solo exhibition, ARCO'91. Alfonso Alcolea Gallery, Madrid. Endstation Portbou, Hommage für Walter Benjamin, Historisches Museum, Frankfurt am Main.
- 1992 Portbou-ko muga, Walter Benjamin Omenaldia. Arteleku, San Sebastian. Entorn al caos, Alfonso Alcolea Gallery, Barcelona. Haags Centrum, The Hague, The Netherlands. S.A., Municipal Foundation of Gijón. La paraula i el paisatge, Trayecto, Vitoria.
- 1994 Solo cum solo, Le Magasin Contemporary Art Center, Grenoble.
- 1996 Continuum, Three indirect discourses, Francesc Abad, Esther Ferrer, Concha Jerez. Trayecto, Vitoria. Elogi a l'ombra, Tristan Barbara Gallery, Barcelona. Lluc Fluxá Gallery, Palma de Mallorca. Museum of Art of Girona. Denise Van de Velde, Aalst, Belgium. Paisatge, Capella de Sant Corneli, Cardedeu. Un alè d'aire, Sala Muncunill, Terrassa. Elogi a l'ombra, Soler-Casamada Gallery, Terrassa. Hotel Europa, Tinglado 2, Tarragona.
- 1997 Un ull que no forma parte del món, Palacio de la Virreina, Barcelona. Denken Danken, Metropolitan Gallery, Barcelona.
- 1998 The word and the world, Espais, Girona. Flanders Stedelig Museum Oud-Hospitaal, Aalst, Belgium.
- 1999 Visions de futur, La paraula i el Món, Institut d'Estudis Ilerdencs, Lleida.
- 2000 La Paraula i el Món, Sa Nostra, Ibiza. Wart War, Interactive installation, Media terra 2000, Athens, Greece.
- 2001 Wart War, Interactive installation, Sala Reus.
- 2002 Copulative Conjunctions, Metrònom, Barcelona. Utopia i Adaptació, within the project Espais Obrats Can Paulet, Mataró. Wart War, interactive installation, El Roser, Lleida. Espais obrats, Can Palauet, Mataró.
- 2004-2007 El Camp de la Bota, Torre Muntadas, El Prat del Llobregat. Regional Museum of Manresa. Can Sistère, Santa Coloma de Gramanet. Wine Museum, Villafranca del Panadés. Museum of the History of Immigration of Catalonia, Masia de Can Serra, San Adrián de Besós. Museum of Mataró. Caixa de Manlleu Museum/Hall. Abelló Museum, Mollet del Vallés. Muncunill Hall, Terrassa.

== Bibliography ==
- Claudia Kalasz and Francesc Abad, F.A. - W.B. Correspondencias, Retrospectiva en papel I, Terrassa: Edición del author, 2017.
- Xavier Nueno and Francesc Abad, Napa(s). Persistir en lo inacabado. Retrospectiva en papel II, Santander: Ediciones La Bahía, 2018.
- Francesc Abad, Panorama. Retrospectiva en papel III, Barcelona: If Publications, 2018.
- Enzo Traverso, "Ernst Bloch - Francesc Abad. Correspondencies", Barcelona: La Automática, 2018
