= Mapesbury =

Coordinates: 51.5517°N 0.280560°W

- Location within Greater London
- Population: 15,529 Mapesbury ward 2011)
- OS grid reference: TQ 1931 8505
- London borough: Brent
- Ceremonial county: Greater London
- Region: London
- Country: England
- Sovereign state: United Kingdom
- Post town: LONDON
- Postcode district: NW2
- Dialling code: 020
- Police: Metropolitan
- Fire: London
- Ambulance: London
- UK Parliament: Brent East
- London Assembly: Brent and Harrow

Mapesbury is a residential area of northwest London, England.

== Geography ==
The ward covers parts of the Kilburn and Cricklewood areas. Mapesbury ward is bounded to the north by Dollis Hill ward, to the west by Dudden Hill ward, to the south west by Willesden Green ward, to the south by Brondesbury Park ward, and to the east by the London Borough of Barnet and (further south) the London Borough of Camden.

== Early history and name ==
The area formed part of the Middlesex parish and manor of Willesden, which was held by the chapter of St Paul's Cathedral by the time of the Norman Conquest. The manor was divided into eight prebends to support the various members of the chapter. One of these duly gained the name "Mapesbury" after Walter Map, prebendary from 1173–c1192. Willesden Lane was known as Mapes Lane until the 1860s.

== Development ==
Mapesbury remained countryside until the 1860s, when residential development began. By 1875 there were a number of large suburban villas. Four years later the Metropolitan Railway opened its line in the area, and building lots were let for "first class residences". Mapesbury Farm was leased to builders in 1893, and Mapesbury Road constructed in the following year. The main development took place between 1895 and 1905, consisting of brick-built houses with extensive tree planting. In 1982 Mapesbury was designated a conservation area.

== Politics ==
The ward of Cricklewood and Mapesbury returns two councillors to sit on Brent Council.

The ward forms part of the Brent East parliamentary constituency and is represented in parliament by Dawn Butler of the Labour Party.

== Demographics ==
Mapesbury ward has strong links to Irish culture and over 10% of its population are Irish. In the 2011 census it had the second largest number of Irish residents among wards in London.

== Notable residents ==
- Ken Livingstone, former Mayor of London and MP for Brent East between 1987 and 2001, lives in Mapesbury.
- Paul Celan's paternal aunt Berta Antschel – one of the few relatives of his who had survived the Holocaust – lived in a flat in Mapesbury Road, where Celan visited her in April 1968 and wrote the poem "Mapesbury Road", which was published posthumously in the collection Schneepart in 1971.
