= Todesfuge =

German language poem written by the Romanian-born poet Paul Celan

"Todesfuge" (Deathfugue) is a German language poem written by the Romanian-born poet Paul Celan probably around 1945 and first published in 1948. It is one of his best-known and often-anthologized poems. Despite critics claiming that the lyrical finesse and aesthetic of the poem did not do justice to the cruelty of the Holocaust, others regard the poem as one that "combines mysteriously compelling imagery with rhythmic variations and structural patterns that are both elusive and pronounced". At the same time it has been regarded as a "masterful description of horror and death in a concentration camp". Celan was born to a Jewish family in Cernăuți, Romania (now Chernivtsi, Ukraine); his parents were murdered in the Holocaust, and Celan himself was a prisoner for a time in a work camp. The poem has reached international relevance by being considered to be one of the most important poems of the post-war period and the most relevant example of Trümmerliteratur.

== Summary ==
The poem is 36 lines long, with breaks after lines 9, 15, 18, 23 and 26, which would seem to divide it into six stanzas. However critics typically regard it as being in four sections, each of which begins with the image Schwarze Milch der Frühe which can be translated as "Black milk of dawn." The speaking voice in the poem is mostly a collective "We". The structure of the poem has been said to reflect that of a musical fugue in that phrases are repeated and recombined, comparably to the musical genre.

=== First section (lines 1–9) ===
The "we" of the poem describes drinking the black milk of dawn at evening, noon, daybreak and night, and shovelling "a grave in the skies". They introduce a "he", who writes letters to Germany, plays with snakes, whistles orders to his dogs and to his Jews to dig a grave in the earth (the words "Rüden" (male dogs) and "Juden" (Jews) are assonant in German), and commands "us" to play music and dance. "He" uses the phrase "your golden hair Margarete", (hair, like the "black milk" becomes a recurrent theme of the poem); this may possibly be in the letter that he writes to Germany, although the wording leaves this unclear.

=== Second section (lines 10–18) ===
The poem repeats many of the images of the first section, but with some changes of word-order. The golden hair of Margarete is now counterpointed with "your ashen hair Sulamith", and "he" now grabs his gun, and is described as blue-eyed, while issuing his orders.

=== Third section (lines 19–26) ===
Again the images are counterpointed and extended. "He" is now associated with the phrase "Death is a master from Germany", and in his orders to play music threatens "you'll rise to the sky like smoke, you'll have a grave in the clouds".

=== Fourth section (lines 27–36) ===
In a further reworking of the themes and images of the poem so far, it emerges that "Death is a master from Germany, his eye is blue", and the "he" shoots his victims with leaden bullets, and sets his dogs on the victims, leading to their "grave in the sky." The final two lines of the poem counterpose "your golden hair Margarete/your ashen hair Sulamith."

== Origins, composition and publication ==
"It was clear to every reader from the start that ['Todesfuge'] was concerned with camps and the Endlösung der Judenfrage (The Final Solution to the Jewish Question), made doubly poignant by the circumstance that the author was known to be a Jew from Eastern Europe." It has often been assumed to reflect the author's own experiences, but Celan himself was never a prisoner in a death camp; the poem reflects more directly the experiences recounted to him.

The exact date of composition of the poem is not known; a date of 1944 or 1945 seems to be most likely.

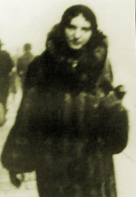
Rose Ausländer (photo from 1939)

The poem contains direct references, or apparent references, to other contemporary works. The oxymoronic image of "black milk" appeared in a poem published in 1939 by Rose Ausländer. Ausländer herself is recorded as saying that Celan's use of this image was "self-explanatory, as the poet may take all material to transmute in his own poetry. It's an honour to me that a great poet found a stimulus in my own modest work".

The relationship of "Todesfuge" to the poem "ER" (HIM) by Immanuel Weissglas is more complex. Written in the early 1940s (the exact date is unknown), "ER" includes lines about "Gretchen's golden hair", "digging graves in the air", "playing with snakes", and "Death, the German Master", all of which occur in "Todesfuge". Weissglas (1920–1979) was like Celan, a native of Cernăuți/Czernowitz in the Bukovina, and the two were at school together, and knew each other in the immediate post-war period in Bucharest, when they were also both acquainted with Rose Ausländer. It was probably Weissglas, who had been interned in Transnistria with Celan's parents, who told Celan of his parents' deaths and their circumstances. "ER" was written in the early 1940s (the exact date is unknown), and was never published. It was, however, part of a typescript collection by Weissglas, Gottes Mühlen in Berlin (God's Mills in Berlin), which Celan would almost certainly have read. Though the two poems have so many elements in common, the tone and form of "ER" and "Todesfuge" are completely different. Jean Bollack wrote of "Todesfuge" that Celan "rearranges [the] elements [of "ER"] without adding any new ones; the elements are the same, but he manages to create something completely different using them".

"Todesfuge" was first published in a Romanian translation titled "Tangoul Mortii" ("Tango of Death") in 1947; Celan's close friend Petre Solomon was the translator. This version was also the first poem to be published under the pseudonym "Celan", derived from the syllables of "Antschel", Celan's real name. The original German version appeared in the 1948 Der Sand aus den Urnen, Celan's first collection of poems; but the print run was small, and the edition was withdrawn because of its many misprints. The poem first became well known when it was included in Celan's 1952 collection, Mohn und Gedächtnis. It has since appeared in numerous anthologies and translations.

== Themes and interpretation ==
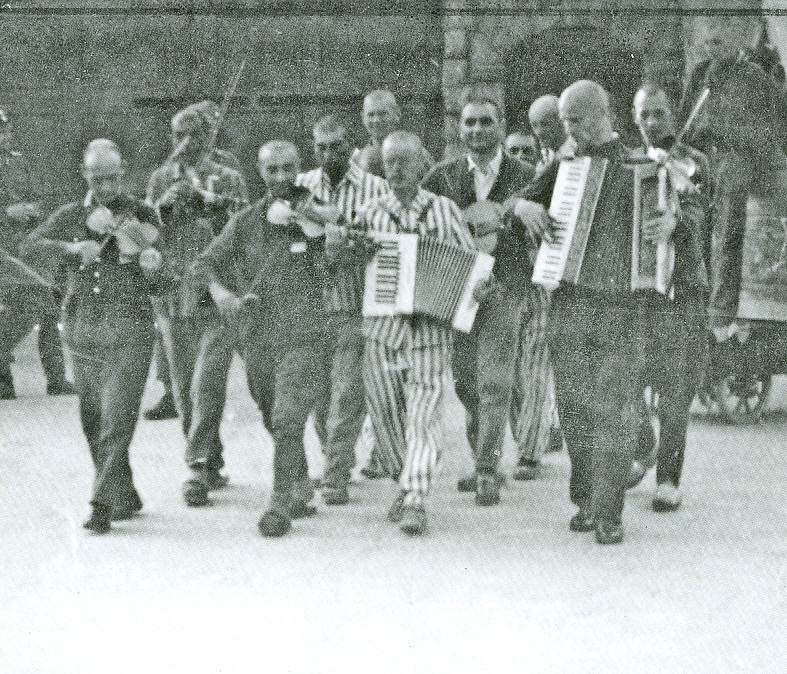
Mauthausen Concentration camp, 30 June 1942: an orchestra of inmates

Although the work is titled a fugue, there is no literal manner of reproducing the musical form of fugue in words; the title must therefore be taken as a metaphor, the phrases and rhythms of the work parallelling the introduction and repetition of musical themes. Rhythm is a strong element of the work, which in its Romanian and German typescript versions was called Death Tango; the poem is structured to give a strong impression of dactyl and trochee rhythms. These are brought out in the poet's own reading of the work, which also varies speed, becoming faster at moments of tension and slowing dramatically for the final lines.

While the events which emerge for the poem strongly evoke aspects of life (and death) in the concentration camps, other references are more indirect. "Margarete" may evoke the heroine of Goethe's Faust, whilst "Shulamith" (the female version of the Hebrew name Solomon), is a figure who appears in the Song of Songs, where she describes herself as "black, yet comely" (Ch. 1 v. 5). The two figures may thus stand as metaphors for Germans and Jews.

There is extensive evidence of Nazi concentration camp orchestras being created from amongst the prisoners and forced to provide entertainment for their SS gaolers. However, the victims in "Todesfuge" being forced to make music and dance for "Him" also recall the exiled Jews in Babylon being asked by their captors to sing (Psalm 137 v. 3; "For there they that carried us away captive required of us a song; and they that wasted us required of us mirth, saying, Sing us one of the songs of Zion"). Moreover, in the specific context of German poetry, they recall the slaves in Heinrich Heine's poem "The Slave Ship" being forced to dance by the mercenary captain.

The recurrent themes, encoded content and dialogic constructions demonstrate Celan's tendencies towards hermeticism.

== Influence ==
Bonnie Roos asserts that the poem "has become a national symbol in postwar Germany." Nan Rosenthal has noted "It was anthologised in readers for [German] high-schools...It was also set to music by numerous German composers and read on television programmes...To commemorate the fiftieth anniversary of Kristallnacht in 1988, "Death Fugue" was read aloud in the Bundestag" (the German Parliament).

"Todesfuge" has been set as a musical work by, among others, the American composers Samuel Adler and Aaron Jay Kernis, the Hungarian composer György Kósa and the Israeli composer Leon Shidlovsky. Harrison Birtwistle has set the poem as part of his cycle Pulse Shadows: Meditations on Paul Celan; the setting also contains hints of the poem's original tango associations. The German composer Hans-Jürgen von Bose has written a version for mixed choir, organ and baritone solo.

Diamanda Galás composed and performed a version for voice and piano, on her 2003 live album Defixiones: Will and Testament.

The phrase der Tod ist ein Meister aus Deutschland ("Death is a master from Germany)" has been used in songs, often in altered form, e.g. by the Black Metal-Band Eisregen (their 2005 album Hexenhaus contains "Der Tod ist ein Meister aus Thüringen"). The poem is used in a song by German punk band Slime, "Der Tod ist ein Meister aus Deutschland".

Rüdiger Safranski titled his biography of Martin Heidegger, who was involved with the Nazi party, Ein Meister aus Deutschland.

The poem's concluding couplet—in translation, "your golden hair Margarete / your ashen hair Sulamith"—was used as the title of two paintings, Dein goldenes Haar Margarete and Dein aschenes Haar Sulamith, created in 1981 by the German artist Anselm Kiefer.
