= Der Sand aus den Urnen =

- Author: Paul Celan
- Language: German
- Publisher: A. Sexl
- Publication date: 1948
- Publication place: Austria
- Pages: 61

Der Sand aus den Urnen (in English, The Sand from the Urns), is a German-language poetry collection by Paul Celan, published in Vienna in 1948. It was the first publication of Celan in German, and contains one of his best-known poems, "Todesfuge" (written 1944–45).

The small edition contained many misprints, and was withdrawn by the author. The poems were republished together with other works in the 1952 collection, Mohn und Gedächtnis.
