= Jacques Schotte =

Belgian psychiatrist and psychoanalyst

Jacques Schotte (June 26, 1928 – September 18, 2007) was a Belgian psychiatrist and psychoanalyst, co-founder, in 1969, with Antoine Vergote and Alphonse De Waelhens of the Belgian School of Psychoanalysis.

== Biography ==
Professor at the Catholic University of Leuven since 1964, Jacques Schotte was an atypical psychiatrist and psychoanalyst. In addition to his classes, he gave many conferences throughout Europe, the United States and Latin America .

Influenced not only by Freud but also by Ludwig Binswanger and by the Greek and German philosophies, Jacques Schotte continued the work of Léopold Szondi, whose genetic approach has given way to the instinctual approach. On the basis of psychoanalysis, phenomenology, Binswanger's Daseinsanalyse and Szondi's fate analysis, he has developed a new approach to the mentally ill man, he called "pathoanalysis. He imagined the development of an autological psychiatry, refocused on its proper human foundations: The anthropopsychiatry. Far from being only an outstanding theoretician, he always wanted to anchor his work in practical clinical experience, made of human encounters, in all their complexity and richness. In his book, Un parcours (A journey), published in June 2006, he recounts his life as a psychiatrist and psychoanalyst. He met all the greatest figures of psychiatry and psychoanalysis in the second half of the twentieth century. He was a close friend of the philosopher of art, Henri Maldiney, and of the Swiss psychiatrist, Roland Kuhn. He was very close to Jacques Lacan too and attended his Seminars. He is also the one who introduced the theory of mediation in Belgium, creating lasting relationships between the Catholic University of Louvain and Rennes 2 University.

== Works ==
- Szondi avec Freud — Sur la voie d'une psychiatrie pulsionnelle, Bruxelles, De Boeck, 1992. ISBN 2-804-11355-8
- Un parcours - Rencontrer, relier, dialoguer, partager, Paris, Éditions Le Pli, 2006.
- Vers l'anthropopsychiatrie. Un parcours, Paris, Éditions Hermann, 2008 (new edition of the previous book). ISBN 978-2705667474
