= Mayotte Bollack =

French professor of philology (1928–2024)

Mayotte Bollack (1928 – 27 April 2024) was a French professor of philology at the University of Lille Nord de France. She was the wife and close collaborator of Jean Bollack whose research interests she shared. Bollack died on 27 April 2024, at the age of 95.

== Publications (selection) ==
- With Heinz Wismann: Philologie und Hermeneutik im 19. Jahrhundert / Philologie et herméneutique en 19ème siècle, Bd. 2, Göttingen 1983

== Bibliography ==
- A. Monet (Hg.): Le jardin romain. Épicurisme et poésie à Rome. Mélanges offerts à Mayotte Bollack. Villeneuve d’Ascq: Centre de Gestion de l’Édition Scientifique, Université Charles-de-Gaulle—Lille 3, 2003. ISBN 2-84467-057-1 (Rez. James Warren, The Classical Review (New Series) 55 (2005) 116-118)
