= Wilhelm Weygandt =

German psychiatrist (1870–1939)

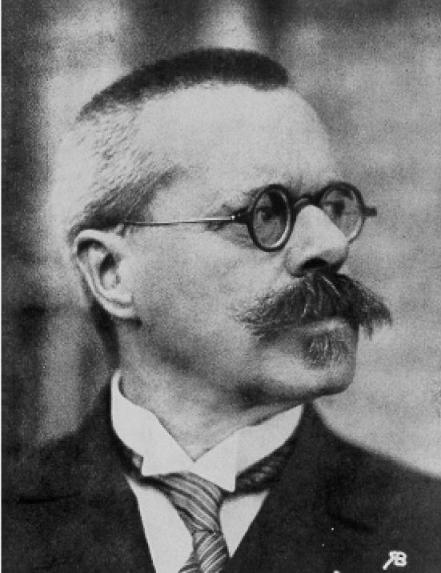
- Born: Wilhelm Christian Jakob Karl Weygandt; 30 September 1870; Wiesbaden, Kingdom of Prussia, German Empire
- Died: 22 January 1939 (aged 68); Wiesbaden, Nazi Germany
- Education: University of Strasbourg
- Scientific career
- Fields: Physics

Wilhelm Christian Jakob Karl Weygandt (30 September 1870 in Wiesbaden – 22 January 1939) was a German psychiatrist. From 1908-1934, he was director of the insane asylum Staatskrankenanstalt Friedrichsberg in Hamburg, and from 1919-1934 professor of Psychiatry at the newly founded University of Hamburg. He was a Nazi, a racist thinker, and condemned Expressionism and other modern art forms as "degenerate art."

In 1901 he published his Atlas und Grundriss der Psychiatrie, which was later used by Leopold Szondi as the source for most of the photographs of the Szondi test.
