= Szondi test =

1935 discredited psychological test

- Purpose: personality test

The Szondi test is a 1935 nonverbal projective personality test developed by Léopold Szondi. He theorized that people's unconscious choices—such as emotional reactions to photographs—could reveal genetically inherited “drives” that shape their fate.

The test has received criticism for its psychometric limitations and theoretical foundations. In a 2006 Delphi poll of U.S. psychologists, it was rated as “probably discredited” for personality assessment; however, the authors noted that 36.6% of respondents were unfamiliar with the test and emphasized that expert consensus does not equate to scientific validity. This opinion survey was not based on any reliability analysis, test–retest study, meta-analysis, or standard error estimation. Moreover, the test was perceived as less valid particularly when the judgment was expressed by professionals adhering to a competing paradigm (CBT) and by respondents who reported being unfamiliar with the test.

Despite the criticism, the Szondi test continues to be used in some European psychoanalytic and projective diagnostic traditions, and has recently been reexamined in the context of modern affective science and epigenetics.

== Theoretical background ==
=== Drive theory and drive diagram ===
In contrast to Freud's work, Szondi's approach is based on a systematic drive theory and a dimensional model of personality. That is, Szondi means to enumerate all human drives, classifying and framing them within a comprehensive theory.

Szondi drive system is built on the basis of eight drive needs, each corresponding to a collective archetype of instinctive action. They are:

- the h-drive need, (named after hermaphroditism, which represents the needs for personal or collective love, tenderness, motherliness, passivity, femininity, bisexuality),
- the sadist drive need
- the e-drive need (named after epilepsy, which represents coarse emotions such as anger, hatred, rage, envy, jealousy and revenge, which simmer until they are suddenly and explosively discharged as if in a seizure, to the surprise and shock of other people),
- the hysteric drive need
- the catatonic drive need
- the paranoid drive need
- the depressive drive need
- the maniac drive need

The eight drive needs represent archetypes and are present in all individuals in different proportions; a fundamental assumption of Fate analysis is that the difference between mental "illness" and mental "health" is not qualitative but quantitative.

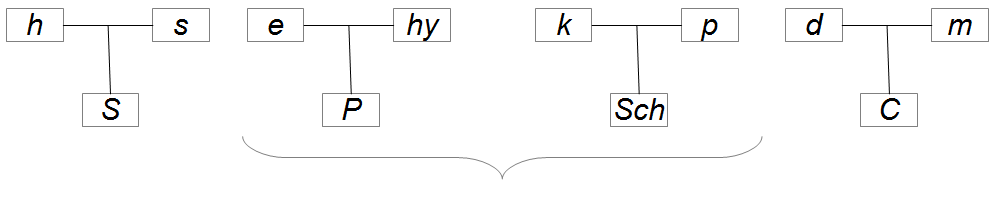
Sex (S) and Contact (C) vectors represent pulsions at the border with the outer world, while the Paroximal (P, representing affects) and Schizoform (Sch, representing the ego) vectors at the inner part of the psyche.

A whole drive (Triebe, in Szondi's own terms), like the sexual drive S, is composed of a pair of two opposite drive needs (Triebbedürfnisse), in this case h (tender love) and s (sadism). Each drive need in turn has a positive and negative striving (Triebstrebung), for instance h+ (personal tender love) and h- (collective love), or s+ (sadism toward the other) and s- (masochism).

The four whole drives correspond to the four independent hereditary circles of mental illness established by the psychiatric genetics of the time: the schizoform drive (containing the paranoid and the catatonic drive needs), the manic-depressive drive, the paroxysmal drive (including the epileptic and hysteric drive needs), and the sexual drive (including the hermaphrodite and the sadomasochist drive needs).

Szondi's drive diagram has been described as his major discovery and achievement. It has also been described as a revolutionary addition to psychology, and as paving the way for a theoretical psychiatry and a psychoanalytical anthropology.

Szondi theory organizes phenomenons like: antisocial personality disorder, paraphilia subtypes, histrionic personality disorder (P++), paranoid proper as "projective paranoid", narcissistic personality disorder as "inflative paranoid", blunted affect (P00), panic disorder (P--), phobia (P+0), hypochondria (Cm-), stupor (-hy), somatization and pain disorder as organ neurosis, conversion disorder (in Pe+, Phy and Schk- danger classes), dissociative fugue (Sch±- and C+0), paroxysmal attack (Sch±-), depersonalization disorder and alienation (Sch-±), obsessive–compulsive disorder and obsessive–compulsive personality disorder (Sch±+).

=== Fate analysis and anthropology ===
Szondi analysis of destiny approach is based an anthropological preoccupation. Szondi's main philosophical references for the concept of fate are Schopenhauer's The World as Will and Representation (1818) and Heidegger's Being and Time (1927).

Fate analysis of a patient is based on the test score, the patient medical history, and his family background through a genealogical tree. Fate analysis includes Genotropism, a form of depth psychology that had some prominence in Europe in the mid-20th century, but has been ignored for the most part.

The starting assumption of fate analysis is that a person's life (destiny) unfolds in a series of elections: one chooses an occupation, acquaintances, partners, family, and ultimately his decisions implicitly selects his illnesses and his death. Szondi's experience in genealogy research led him to believe that these elections can not be considered only as the individual sovereign decision, but that such choices often follow certain patterns that preexisted within his family ancestors. Szondi concluded that some life choices are genetically inherited.

=== Profession choice and fate ===
Szondi argued that his research showed that profession choices are determined by the dynamic and structure of the psyche, a phenomenon that he called operotropism. He said, from a sociological perspective, the most important discovery made through fate psychology has been the discerning of the role played by latent inherited genes (genotropic factors) in the choice of a particular vocation or profession.

Of the many possibilities in which operotropism can manifest itself, he gave two examples. A man may choose a profession in which he can engage with individuals with related inclinations; this is the case of a psychiatrist with paranoid schizoform inclinations, or a lawyer with querulant inclinations and an addiction to litigation. The second example of operotropism is a man that chooses a profession in which he can satisfy in a socially acceptable manner needs that in their original primary form would constitute a danger for society. This is the case of pyromania-firefighter, sadism-butcher, coprophilia-intestine or -drain cleaner. Most jobs can satisfy more than one drive need.

==== Professions of the sexual circle ====
===== Hermaphrodite professions =====
The work object of the hermaphrodite professions is the body (own or other); the work circumstances are bathhouse, beach, barber shop, restaurant, café, theater, circus, millinery, brothel; the main sensory perceptions are taste and sight; work instruments are jewelry, clothing; professional activities are eyelining, make-up, handcraft, weaving, embroidery, darning.

Jobs of the hermaphrodite type are hairdresser, esthetician, dermatologist, gynecologist, bath house, beauty parlor and spa worker, fashion illustrator, performing artist (vaudeville, acrobat, circus performer), singer, ballet dancers, dance artists, servant, waiter, hotel manager, confectioner, cook. Criminal, or most socially negative, activities of hermaphrodite type are fraud, embezzlement, spy, prostitute, pimp, procuring. The most socially positive professions are gynecologist and sexual pathologist.

===== Sadistic professions =====
The work objects of the sadistic professions are animals, stone, iron, metal, machinery, soil, wood; the work circumstances are stall, slaughterhouse, animal breeding facilities, zoo, arena, mine, forest, mountain, operating theater, dissecting room; the main sensory perceptions are depth perception and muscle sense; work instruments are the primordial tools: ax, hatchet, pickaxe, chisel, hammer, drill, knife, whip; the work activity is big muscle work.

Sadistic jobs type are truck driver, farm servant, animal tamer, veterinary, manicure, pedicure, animal slaughter, surgical nurse, surgeon, dentist, anatomist, hangman, forestry worker, lumberjack, stonemason, miner, road worker, sculptor, chauffeur, soldier, wrestler, physical education teacher, gym instructor, masseur.

==== Schizoform professions ====
===== Katatonoid professions =====
The work objects of the katatonoid professions are the reproductive and abstract sciences: logic, maths, physics, aesthetics, geography, grammar, and so on; the work circumstances are closed spaces, classrooms, archives, libraries, "ivory towers," monasteries; the sensory perceptions are turned off; work instruments are books; professional activities are writing, reading.

Jobs of the schizoform, katatonoid, drive striving k+: pedagogue, soldier, engineer, professor (mainly linguist, or professor of logic, mathematics, physics, philosophy, social sciences). Personality traits found in this group are aristocratic exclusivity, eccletic friendship choices, systematizate, schematize, rigid formalism.

Jobs of the schizoform, katatonic, drive striving k-: aesthetician, art critic; accountant, lower officer, cartographer, technical drafter, graphic designer; postal worker, telegraph operator; printer; farmer, forester; lighthouse keeper, security guard; model. Personality traits found in this group are pedantry, accuracy, exemplarity; lack of humor, taciturnity, brusqueness; phlegm, callousness, calm; hypersensitivity; obstinacy, stubbornness; Inability to debate, self-consciousness; narrow-mindedness, bigotry; compulsiveness, automation, mannerisms; Feeling of omnipotence, autism; inability to be absorbed in the other (auto psychological resonance); taciturnity, immobility, all-having.

Criminal, or most socially negative, activities of katatonic type are work aversion, lone vagrancy, world wanderer, burglary. On the other extreme of the spectrum, the most socially positive professions are professor, logician, philosopher, aesthetician, theoretical mathematician, physicist.

===== Paranoid professions =====
The work objects of the paranoid professions are the pragmatic and analytic sciences (psychology, psychiatry, medicine, chemistry), music, mysticism, mythology, occultism; the work circumstances are research institutes, labs, chemical factories, exotic places, the depths of the mind and of the Earth, mental hospital, prison; the main sensory perceptions are olfaction and hearing; work instruments are ideas, creativity, inspiration.

The hebephrenic group belongs to the schizoform professions and partially overlaps with the paranoid professions. Hebephrenic jobs include graphologist and astrologer.

==== Paroxymal professions ====
===== Epileptiform professions =====
The work objects of the epileptiform professions are the primordial elements earth, fire, water, air, spirit; the work circumstances are height/depth, rise/fall, waves/swirling motion (turning in circle); the main sensory perceptions are balance and olfaction; work instruments are means of transportation: bicycle, electric or conventional train, boat, automobile, aircraft; professional activities are locomotion and moving occupations for the striving e-, and praying (silence), devotion, care, help, charity for the striving e+.

Jobs of the epileptiform, "Cain" striving e- include: porter (bellhop), carter (truck driver), sailor, able seaman, chauffeur, aviator; blacksmith, stoker, oven operator, chimney sweep, firefighter, pyrotechnician, baker; soldier (especially flamethrowers, explosive departments like grenadier, pioneer, stormtrooper). While those of the "Moses" striving e+ group include: priest, missionary woman, nun, monk, "protectress", public health doctor.

Criminal, or most socially negative, epileptiform activities are kleptomania, pyromania, crime of passion, while the most socially positive are religious professions, health care provider, forensic pathology.

===== Hysteriform professions =====
The work object of the hysteriform professions is the own person; the work circumstances are audience, theatre, meeting, mass, street; work instruments and activities are playing with oneself, facial expressions, the voice, colour and movement effects.

Jobs of the hysteriform group include: acting (in females, amazons and tragic heroines roles); politics professionals: member of parliament, chief of Bureau or in factory; car driver; animal tamer; market woman, town crier, barker; performing artist (vaudeville, acrobat, circus performer), orator; model; sports: swordsmanship, horseback riding, hunting, wrestling and mountain climbing.

A criminal, or most socially negative, epiletiform activity is impostor, while the most socially positive are politician, actor.

== Test description ==
It is a projective personality test, the same category of the most-known Rorschach test, but with the crucial difference of being nonverbal. The test consists in showing the examinee a series of facial photographs, displayed in six groups of eight each. All 48 subjects featured in the photographs are mental patients, each group containing a photo of a person whose personality had been classified as homosexual, a sadist, an epileptic, an hysteric, a katatonic, a paranoid, a depressive and a maniac. The subject is asked to choose the two most appealing and the two most repulsive photos of each group. The choices will supposedly reveal the subject satisfied and unsatisfied instinctive drive needs, and the subject's dimensions of personality. Each photo is supposed to be a stimulus apt to detect the pulsional drive tendencies of the examinee, from which the main personality traits can surface.

Szondi further broke down the results into four different vectors: a homosexual/sadistic, epileptic/hysterical, catatonic/paranoid and depressive/manic.

To interpret the test scores, a variety of methods have been developed by Szondi himself and other researchers. They can be classified as quantitative, qualitative and proportional methods.

== Production ==
The Szondi test is a psychological exam named after its Jewish Hungarian creator, Léopold Szondi in the Eötvös Loránd University in Budapest Hungary. The test was first formulated by Szondi around 1935.

In 1944, Szondi published Schicksalsanalyse ("Fate analysis"), the first of a five volume series.

=== Forms of existence ===
In 1960 Szondi began to collaborate with psychotherapeut Armin Beeli on 17 "forms of existence", divided in two main groups "forms of danger" (Gefährexistenzformen) and "forms of protection" (Schutzexistenzformen). On the basis of the syndromatics (diagnotisc method) published in book 3 (1952) and 4 (1956) of the Schicksalsanalyse, one or two (rarely three) forms of existence are detected from each test profile. First results of this research were published in 1963.

Szondi condensed the syndromatics into a table called Testsymptome zur Bestimmung der 17 Existenzformen (test symptoms for the identification of the 17 existence forms), which was published in Szondiana VI (1966) and in the final edition of book 2 (1972). However, the table alone is not sufficient, as analysis of the forms existence still demands "solid knowledge and practice of Syndromatik", in addition to thorough training in Fate Analysis thinking.

=== Origin of the photographs ===
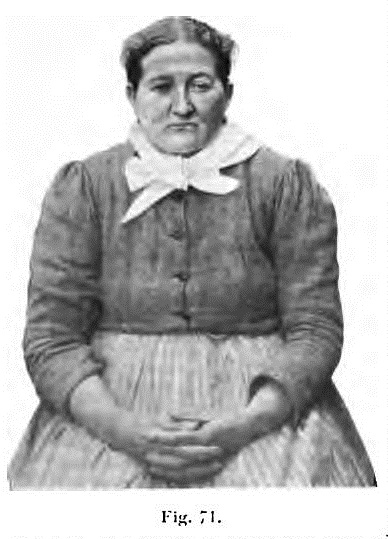
One of the 30 images taken from Weygandt's Atlas, used by Szondi as n.7 in serie 6.

30 of the 48 photographs were taken from Wilhelm Weygandt's 1901 Atlas und Grundriss der Psychiatrie, which is now in the public domain. Of the remaining 18 pictures:

- four were from Magnus Hirschfeld's Sexuelle Zwischenstufen: Das männliche Weib und der weibliche Mann (1918);
- two were from Otto Binswanger's Die Hysterie (1904);
- one was from Theodor Kirchhoff's Der Gesichtsausdruck und seine Bahnen beim Gesunden und Kranken, besonders beim Geisteskranken (The facial expression and its paths among the healthy and the sick, especially the mentally ill) published in 1904, Lehrbuch der Irrenheilkunde;
- one was from Friedrich Scholz's Lehrbuch der Irrenheilkunde : für Aerzte und Studirende (1892).

Six photos were from a criminologic clinic in Stockholm (the Swedish Institute of Criminal Psychiatry) directed by St. Strobl. and four were taken by Szondi himself in Hungary.

The shock element of the photos is crucial. Commenting an experiment with alternative pictures of mental patients, Szondi argued that since the photos used were nicer or less disturbing, they failed to trigger the responses that the test is supposed to.

== Statistical properties and criticism ==
The Szondi test is not widely used in modern clinical psychology, because its psychometric properties are weak. However, it remains in the history of psychology as one of the well-known psychological instruments.

Early studies in the 1950s investigated the test's statistical properties. It was found that patients responded inconsistently to photographs representing the same factor. Susan Deri's predictions on test results of "normals and neurotics", and changes in these results after therapy, were not supported by data. Differentiating signs for epileptics and homosexuals, suggested by Szondi and Deri, were found to be weak and routine clinical use of the test was not recommended. Another study of four experiments failed to support the underlying theory and did not recommend its use in clinical situations. A 1953 evaluation concluded that "data can be established with a high degree of consistency among observers" but its "interpretation remains a tenuous process of undetermined validity".

Some studies attempted to measure the ability of (psychology and non-psychology) students to simply diagnose the subjects on the test photographs, ignoring the rest of the theory, to determine how meaningful stimuli the images were. The results showed large differences between factors and inconsistency among same-factor photographs. Homosexuals and Manics were identified in as high as half the cases, greatly exceeding chance, while Epileptics could not be reliably detected. In conclusion, the study suggested a "complete reorganization" of the test: images with "precise statistical significance" and "standardization for a particular population". Review of the (then available) evidence could not establish the test's clinical value.

It was noted that picture selection may be better explained by "superficial facial clues" and "learned reactions" than Szondi's genetic theory. This would explain why smiling faces are more easily identified as manic, or accepting and friendly faces are chosen more frequently while cruel and asocial ones rejected more often. A later study attempted to measure students ability to identify known personality characteristics (masculinity-femininity) of subjects based on images. The results failed to confirm this ability and suggested that "positive validity findings within the Szondi test are likely to be based on stereotyped perceptions" rather than personality characteristics. Factor analysis of image preferences revealed that selection is largely related to identifiable characteristics like age, sex, mood or conventionality of appearance.

== Influences ==
Szondi Fate analysis has influenced philosophers Henri Niel, Alphonse De Waelhens and Henry Maldiney, and psychiatrist Jacques Schotte. In 1949, Susan Deri published the first English language description to the Szondi test. Some graphologists attempted to integrate the szondi test with graphological test; however, Sonzdi was not a graphologist and the goal of his test was in contrast with graphology.

In 1959, the international Szondi Society was established, and holds a symposium every three years. In 1969, The Szondi Institute was formed, and published from Zurich the journal Szondiana.

Artist Kurt Kren created a motion picture, 2/60 48 Köpfe aus dem Szondi-Test, from the still shots of the Szondi test in 1964.

== Szondi books on fate analysis ==
=== Main books series ===
Szondi's main work is his five volume series on fate analysis (Schicksalsanalyse). They were first published from 1944 (volume one) to 1963 (volume five). The first two were later republished in multiple revised editions. They are:

- Das erste Buch: Schicksalsanalyse. Wahl in Liebe, Freundschaft, Beruf, Krankheit und Tod. B. Schwabe, Basel, 1944. (2nd edition 1948, 3rd edition 1965, fourth edition 1978)
- Das zweite Buch: Lehrbuch der Experimentellen Triebdiagnostik (Textband). Huber, Bern und Stuttgart, 1947. (1st edition 308pp, 2nd edition 1960 443pp, 3rd edition 1972 484pp) This is the book in which Szondi explains in details how to perform and interpret the test. Only the first edition, which would be completely overhauled in 1960, was translated into English as Experimental Diagnostics of Drives (1952). The 1972 third edition added a 40-page long appendix, that included a table to help determine the dangerous and the protective forms of existence. The Textband (text volume) is complemented by two additional (smaller) volumes, sold separately: Band 2: Testband, which contains the photographs and additional material to take the test, and Band 3: Trieblinnäus-Band (classification of instincts).
- Das dritte Buch: Triebpathologie, also called and classified as Triebpathologie, Band I (Drive pathology, volume I), and subtitled Elemente der exakten Triebpsychologie und Triebpsychiatrie. Huber, Bern und Stuttgart, 1952. Composed of two parts: part A Elemente der exakten Triebpsychologie (Teil 1 Dialektische Trieblehre pp. 37–156, Teil 2 Dialektische Methodik pp. 159–234), and part B Elemente der exakten Triebpsychiatrie (Teil 3 Klinische Psychologie, Experimentelle Syndromatik pp. 237–509). Part A and B have been republished, with no changes (unverändert Auflage), in two separate volumes: Part A as Triebpathologie: Dialektische Trieblehre und dialektische Methodik der Testanalyse(1977, 234pp); part B as Triebpathologie: Elemente der exakten Triebpsychiatrie: Klinische Psychologie, experimentelle Syndromatik, Volume 1 (with unchanged page numbers). (1977, pp. 235–543)
- Das vierte Buch: Ich-Analyse, subtitled Die Grundlage zur Vereinigung der Tiefenpsychologie. Zweiter in sich abgeschlossener Band der Triebpathologie. Huber, Bern und Stuttgart, 1956.
- Das fünfte Buch: Schicksalsanalytische Therapie, subtitled Ein Lehrbuch der passiven und aktiven analytischen Psychotherapie. Huber, Bern und Stuttgart, 1963. (see pp. 157–170).

=== Introductory conferences ===
In 1963, after finishing the fifth volume, he published Introduction to Fate Analysis; it is a short book that collects conferences he held at the University of Zurich the previous year, with the aim of introducing to a larger public the most important results of his research. The conference collection was first published in French translation, as they were unpublished in German. A second tome of introductory conferences has also been published:

- Introduction à l'analyse du destin. Tome I : Psychologie générale du destin, Translated by Claude van Reeth, 1972.
- Introduction à l'analyse du destin. Tome II : Psychologie spéciale du destin, 1983.

=== Other works ===
Other works by Szondi include:

- Analysis of Marriages. An attempt at a theory of choice in love. Acta Psychologica, 1937.
- Kain. Gestalten des Bösen. Huber, Bern, Stuttgart, Wien, 1969.
- Moses. Antwort auf Kain. Huber, Bern, Stuttgart, Wien, 1973.
- Die Triebentmischten (Drive separation) Bern: Huber, 1980
- Integration der Triebe: die Triebvermischten (Integration of drives: the drive mixing). Huber, Bern, Stuttgart, Wien, 1984

== See also ==
- Big Five personality traits
- Trait theory
- Values scales
