= Péter Szondi =

German academic

- Born: 27 May 1929; Budapest, Kingdom of Hungary
- Died: 18 October 1971 (aged 42); West Berlin, West Germany
- Occupation: Philologist
- Father: Léopold Szondi

Péter Szondi (Hungarian: [ˈpeːtɛr ˈsondi]; 27 May 1929 – 18 October 1971) was a celebrated literary scholar and philologist, originally from Hungary.

== Biography ==
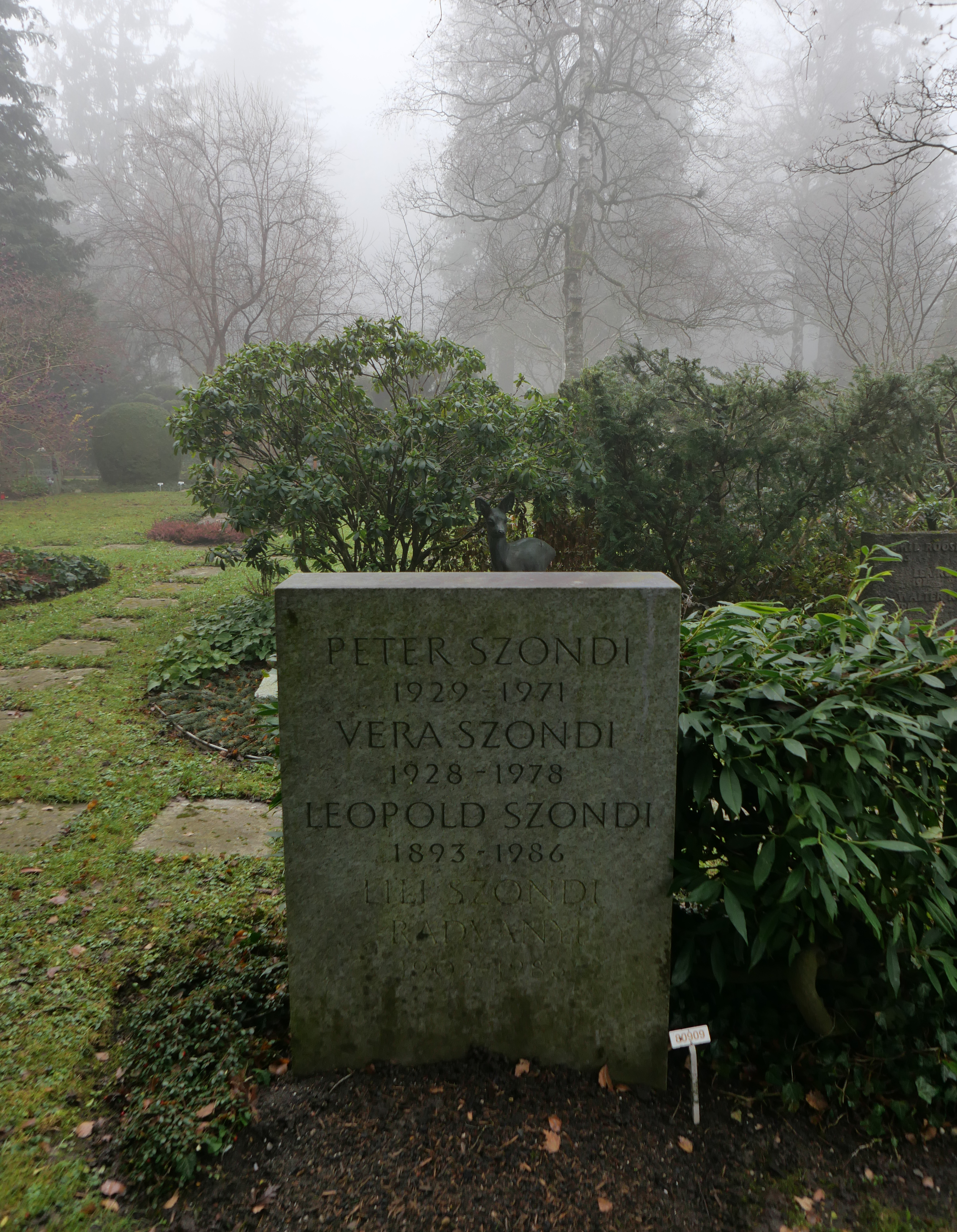
The grave of Szondi, his parents Leopold and Ilona "Lili" Livia, née Radványi (1902–1986), and his sister Vera (1928–1978), a medical doctor, at the Fluntern Cemetery in Zurich.

Szondi's father was the Hungarian-Jewish psychiatrist and psychoanalyst Léopold Szondi, who settled in Switzerland after his 1944 release after five months in Bergen-Belsen.

From 1965 onwards, Péter Szondi was full professor and director of the newly founded Seminar for General and Comparative Literature at the Free University of Berlin, the first comparative literature institute in the Federal Republic. He was also a visiting professor at Princeton and Jerusalem. Szondi contributed significantly to the internationalization of literary studies, which had not been seen in Germany since 1933. He turned his back on national philologies and opened the humanities to European literature. Guests at his institute included scholars and poets who were friends of his, such as Theodor W. Adorno, Gershom Scholem, René Wellek, Bernhard Böschenstein, Jean Starobinski, Jean Bollack, and Jacques Derrida. Szondi's works have been translated into several languages.

Péter Szondi committed suicide in 1971 by drowning himself in the Halensee in Berlin on 18 October, leaving unfinished his book about the work of his friend Paul Celan, who had killed himself the year before.

== Works ==
- Über eine "Freie Universität". Suhrkamp, 1973
- Die Theorie des bürgerlichen Trauerspiels im 18. Jahrhundert. Suhrkamp, 1973
- Celan-Studien. Suhrkamp, 1972 = Celan Studies, trans. Susan Bernofsky with Harvey Mendelsohn, Stanford University Press, 2003. ISBN 9780804744027
- Hölderlin-Studien. Insel, 1967
- Satz und Gegensatz. Insel, 1964
- Der andere Pfeil. Insel, 1963
- Versuch über das Tragische. Insel, 1961
- Theorie des modernen Dramas. Suhrkamp, 1956
- "Hope in the Past: On Walter Benjamin", reprinted in Benjamin, W. (trans. Howard Eiland), Berlin Childhood Around 1900, 2006, Belknap Press [Harvard UP]. ISBN 0-674-02222-X
