= John Felstiner =

American journalist (1936–2017)

- Felstiner at Stanford University in 2009
- Website: canpoetrysavetheearth.com

John Felstiner (July 5, 1936 – February 24, 2017), was an American literary critic, translator, and poet. His interests included poetry in various languages, environmental and ecologic poems, literary translation, Vietnam era poetry and Holocaust studies. John Felstiner died in February 24, 2017 at the age of 80. He had been suffering from the effects of progressive aphasia at his time of death, at a hospice near Stanford.

== Biography ==
Felstiner was born in Mount Vernon, New York and grew up in New York and New England. He graduated from Phillips Exeter Academy, Harvard College, A.B. (magna cum laude), 1958, and Harvard University, Ph.D., 1965.

From 1958 to 1961, he served on the USS Forrestal, in the Mediterranean. Felstiner came to Stanford University in 1965 and was a professor of English at Stanford until his retirement in 2009. Felstiner is also known for writing, non academically but very movingly, of a former student of his, Elizabeth Wiltsee, in the late 60’s at Stanford. Pretty, precocious “Liz” Wiltsee had been a brilliant literature student, who declined into mental illness and homelessness, never fulfilling her great promise. She died around the age of 50, under mysterious circumstances. While at Stanford, Felstiner was three times a fellow at Stanford Humanities Center; a Fulbright professor at University of Chile (1967–68); visiting professor at Hebrew University of Jerusalem (1974–75); and visiting professor of Comparative Literature and English at Yale University (1990, 2002).

His collection of Paul Celan’s manuscripts, letters, and widespread context, along with Felstiner’s own translation archive, are housed at the Lilly Library, Indiana University, Bloomington.

John and his wife, the writer, historian and professor Mary Lowenthal Felstiner, have two children: Sarah and Alek, and also two grandchildren.

== Selected works ==
- The Turn of the Screw and Other Stories by Henry James, edited with an introduction, biography, and notes by John Felstiner, 1966, Scholastic Book Services, ASIN B000V51Y68
- Max Beerbohm and the Wings of Henry James, 1967
- The Lies of Art: Max Beerbohm's Parody and Caricature, 1972, Alfred A. Knopf, ISBN 978-0394472270
- The Dark Room and Other Poems, by Enrique Lihn, co-translator John Felstiner New Directions, 1978, ASIN B002SMJFNG
- Translating Neruda: The Way to Macchu Picchu, Stanford University Press, 1980, ISBN 978-0804713276
- ‘Deep in the glowing text-void’: Translating Late Celan, Representations 32, 1990,
- Looking for Kafka, Stanford: Associates of the Stanford University Libraries, 1990, ASIN B002RYON96
- Looking for Kafka, Stanford Magazine, Winter 1991
- Paul Celan: Poet, Survivor, Jew, Yale University Press, 1995, ISBN 978-0300089226
- Heights of Macchu Picchu / Alturas de Macchu Picchu, by Pablo Neruda, translator John Felstiner, with photographs by Edward Ranney, Limited Editions Club, 1998, ASIN B000WW5FYM
- Jewish American Literature: A Norton Anthology, Co-editor, W.W. Norton, 2000, ISBN 978-0393048094
- Selected Poems and Prose of Paul Celan, editor and translator, W.W. Norton, 2001, ISBN 978-0393322248
- this dust of words: Elizabeth Wiltsee, Stanford Magazine, Sept.- Oct. 2001
- Paul Celan Meets Samuel Beckett, American Poetry Review, July - August 2004
- Writing Zion: An Exchange between Celan and Amichai, The New Republic, 12 June 2006
- 'Lure of the God': Robert Duncan on Translating Rilke. (with David Goldstein), Jacket 31, October 2006
- 'Earth’s Most Graphic Transaction': The Syllables of Emily Dickinson, American Poetry Review, Mar.- Apr. 2007
- Nature vs. Man: For Robinson Jeffers, it wasn’t even close, The Weekly Standard, 28 May 2007
- 'It looks just like the Cascades': Gary Snyder’s Eye for the Real World, Jacket 34, October 2007
- History vs. Nature [W. B. Yeats], The Weekly Standard, 22 September 2008
- Modern Critical Views: Emily Dickinson, ed. Harold Bloom, Chelsea House Publications, 2008, ISBN 978-0791096130
- Paul Celan and Yehuda Amichai: An Exchange on Nation and Exile, WORDS without BORDERS, 2008
- 'that witnessing presence': Life Illumined Around Denise Levertov, Jacket 36, 2008
- The One and Only Circle: Paul Celan’s Letters to Gisèle, introduction and translation from the French by John Felstiner, Fiction 54, 2008
- Can Poetry Save the Earth?: A Field Guide to Nature Poems, Yale University Press, 2009, ISBN 978-0300168136
- ‘Deep in the time-crevasse’: Celan’s Outward and Inward Landscape, Free Verse: A Journal of Contemporary Poetry & Poetics, Summer 2010
- John Felstiner on Paul Celan, Poetry Society of America
- The Post Natural World: An Interview with Gary Snyder, Poetry Foundation,
- John Felstiner: The Future We Want—Can Poetry Save the Earth, Rio+20 - United Nations Conference on Sustainable Development
- Maverick translation, Jacket2, 21 November 2014
- THE V-LETTER: A STORY SURVIVED, Michigan Quarterly Review, 10 December 2014

== Selected honors and awards ==
- First Kenyon Review Prize in Criticism, for Max Beerbohm and the Wings of Henry James (1967)
- National Endowment for the Arts Literature and Translation Fellowships (1969, 1971, 1984, 2002)
- Rockefeller (1980), Guggenheim (1983), and National Endowment for the Humanities (1971, 1989) fellowships, and Bellagio Center (Rockefeller Foundation) Residency (1996)
- Translating Neruda: The Way to Macchu Picchu won the California Commonwealth Club Gold Medal for Non-fiction.
- Paul Celan: Poet, Survivor, Jew won the Truman Capote Prize for Literary Criticism and was a finalist for the National Book Critics Circle award and the Modern Language Association’s James Russell Lowell prize.
- Selected Poems and Prose of Paul Celan won translation prizes from the American Translators Association, Modern Language Association, and PEN West.
- Member, American Academy of Arts and Sciences, 2005.

== Selected interviews, book reviews, and articles ==
- Audio: An Author Asks: ‘Can Poetry Save The Earth’ from KQED "Forum" with Michael Krasny on NPR
- this dust of words Stanford Magazine, September/October 2001
- Felstiner on poetry, environmentalism Stanford University News, April 1, 2009
- How Jews used ‘creative resistance’ to oppose the Nazis Stanford University News, April 30, 2010
- Attentiveness – Natural Prayer of the Soul: Interview with John Felstiner by Ilya Kaminsky, In Posse Review
- This Dust of Words A film by Bill Rose based on the memoir by John Felstiner
- Paul Celan, John Felstiner, and the Soul of Beauty by Cynthia Haven, The Book Haven, October 21, 2012
- Farewell to John Felstiner, critic, translator, poet: “an exemplary life in literature” by Cynthia Haven, The Book Haven, March 3, 2017
