= Von Schwelle zu Schwelle =

1955 poetry collection by Paul Celan

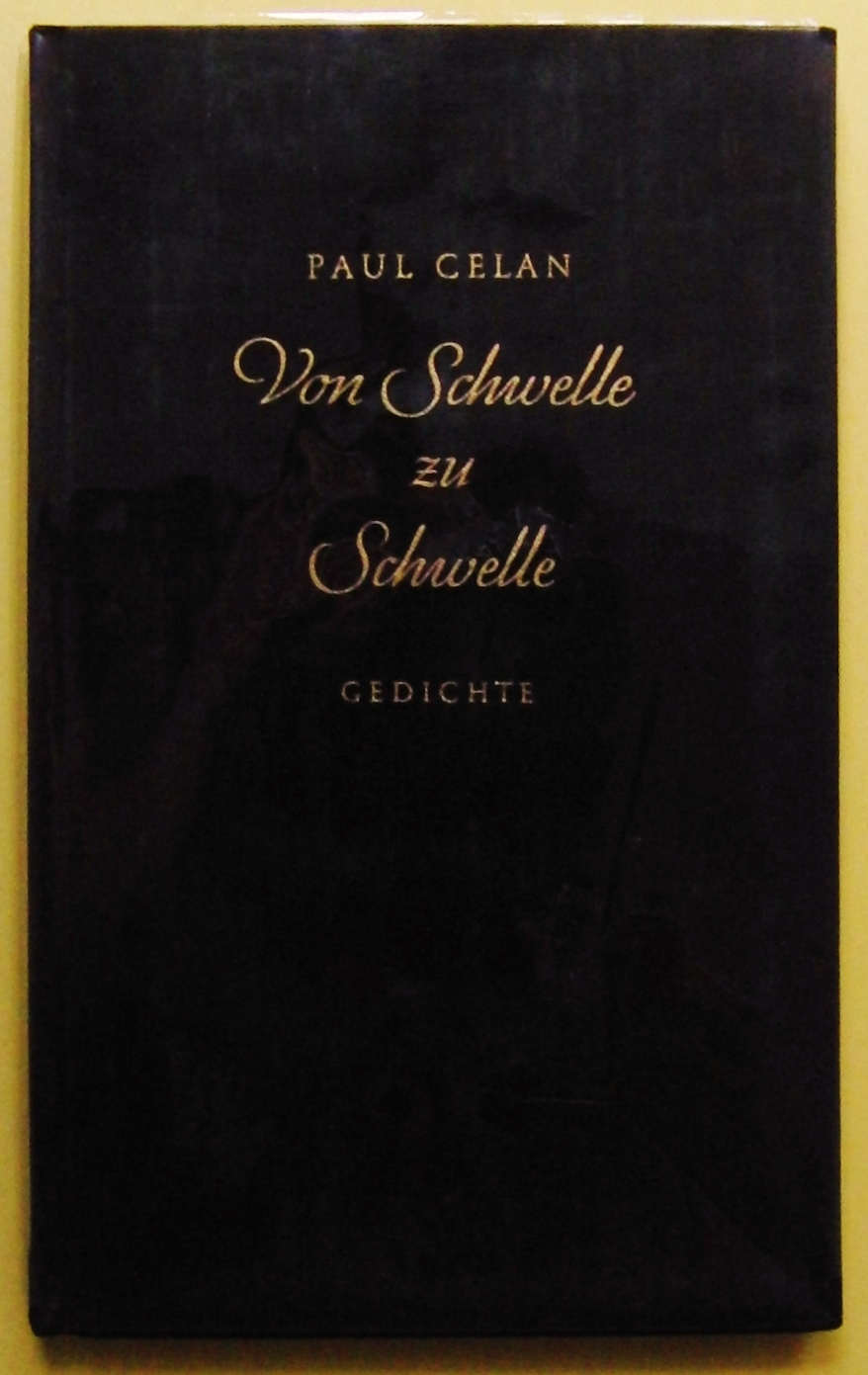
- First edition (Deutsche Verlags-Anstalt, 1955
- Author: Paul Celan
- Translator: Michael Hamburger (in English)
- Language: German
- Publisher: Deutsche Verlags-Anstalt
- Publication date: 1955
- English publication date: 1988
- Pages: 65

Von Schwelle zu Schwelle (in English From Threshold to Threshold) is a 1955 German-language poetry collection by Paul Celan.
