= Gisèle Lestrange =

French graphic artist (1927–1991)

Gisèle Lestrange or Gisèle de Lestrange, and after marriage, Gisèle Celan-Lestrange (19 March 1927 – 9 December 1991), was a French graphic artist.

== Biography ==
Born in Paris, Lestrange studied drawing and painting at the Académie Julian in Paris from 1945 to 1949, and then etching at the Atelier Friedlaender, in Paris, from 1954 to 1957. She became a well-known engraver, working for the Atelier Lacourière-Frélaut in Paris as of 1964. Her father, a known supporter of the Vichy regime, died in 1943.

On 21 December 1952 she married the poet Paul Celan, whom she had met in November 1951. The couple had two sons, Francois (b. 1953), who died immediately after birth, and Eric (b. 1955). As of 1967, however, she and Celan lived in separate homes. As a graphic artist, she illustrated the works of a number of well-known poets. Many of her works are linked to Celan's poems. She died in Paris, and was buried in the same grave as her husband, at Cimetière parisien de Thiais.

== Illustrator ==
- Paul Celan, Atemkristall, Brunidor, 1965.
- Portfolio VI, Brunidor, 1967.
- Paul Celan, Schwarzmaut, Brunidor, 1969.
- Journal : Les Minuscules Episodes, 1974
- Martine Broda, Double, La Répétition, 1978.
- Issue 4 of the revue Clivages

== Bibliography ==
- Paul Celan - Gisèle Celan-Lestrange, Correspondance (1951–1970), correspondence of the pair, with selection of Paul Celan's lettres to his son Eric, edited and commented by Bertrand Badiou, with the help of Eric Celan, Paris, éd. du Seuil, 2001, 2 volumes.
- John Felstiner Paul Celan: Poet, Survivor, Jew. New Haven: Yale University Press, 1995, pp. 72–73.
- Katalog der Werke [Catalogue Raisonné of the artist's works], edited by Ute Bruckinger and Klaus Bruckinger in collaboration with Eric Celan and Bertrand Badiou. Tübingen; Berlin: Wasmuth 2009 ISBN 978-3-8030-3332-1
