= Zeitgehöft =

1976 poetry collection by Paul Celan

- Author: Paul Celan
- Language: German
- Publisher: Suhrkamp Verlag
- Publication date: 1976
- Pages: 65

Zeitgehöft (which can be rendered in English as Timestead) is a German-language poetry collection by Paul Celan, published posthumously in 1976.
