= Genotropism =

Genotropism is defined as the reciprocal attraction between carriers of the same or related latent recessive genes. Developed by the Hungarian psychiatrist Léopold Szondi in the 1930s, the theory concludes that instinct is biological and genetic in origin. Szondi believed that these genes regulated the "possibilities of fate" and was the working principle of the familial unconscious.

== Overview ==
Genotropism consists of the theory that genes influence human behavior. While identified as entities, genes exist in groups because evolution favors cooperation. Within each gene group, it is possible to detect specific needs that function as mechanisms of screening and natural selection.

Szondi arrived a sort of genetic determinism, a philosophical theory of predestination. "The latent hereditary factors in human beings, the recessive genes, do not remain dormant or inactive within the human organism, but exert a very important and even decisive influence upon its behavior. This latent or recessive gene theory claims that these non-dominant hereditary factors determine the Object selection, voluntary and involuntary, of the individual. The drives resulting from these latent genes, therefore, direct the individual's selection of love objects, friendships, occupations, diseases, and forms of death. Hence, from the very beginning of the human's existence there is a hidden plan of life guided by 'Instinctual drives'."

=== Instinctual drives ===
In Szondi's theory, each "need" (a link between genes and behavior) comprises a polarity of positive and negative tendencies. Needs also group together in polarities to form larger wholes called "instinctual drives." Together, behavior tendencies, needs, and drives combine to form patterned wholes.

Szondi created a drive theory that determines that every drive has at least four genes. "The four Szondian drives are (1) contact, (2) sexual, (3) paroxysmal, and (4) ego. They are implicated in their corresponding psychiatric disorders and equivalents: (1) manic-depression, (2) sexual abnormality, (3) epilepsy and hysteria, and (4) schizophrenia." By locating mental disorders in biological drives, one can illustrate that illness is a disharmony of basic needs.

=== The Familial unconscious ===
Genotropism is the working principle of the familial unconscious, the quantitative sharing of genes across the generations of family. Offspring may inherit several genes from both parents, while others receive fewer genes and exhibit spectrum conditions. (For example, while one child is diagnosed with epilepsy, the other only shows various symptoms over a period of time).

Szondi observed that when families pass down genes for specific diseases, the same family transmits defenses against those disorders. Known to Szondi as heterosis, it is currently known as "balancing selection."

Szondi concluded that genetic traits confer needs and tendencies that shape decision making. "Genetic tendencies can be decoded by constructing genealogies, indicating recurrent patterns of marriage, friendship, and vocational choices in relation to types of illness and modes of death. Destiny comprises all of the hereditary tendencies in the familial unconscious which are expressed primarily through marriage and vocational selections." Basically, the needs and tendencies in which humans exhibit will guide similar genes to one another.

=== The Oedipus complex ===
While Szondi accepted the Oedipus complex, he found that it existed only under the following conditions: when the mother sees her father or brother represented in her son, or when the father sees his mother or sister in his daughter. Therefore, the son takes after the genes represented in his maternal grandfather or uncles, and the daughter after her paternal grandmother or aunt.

== Current application ==
Although it was mostly abandoned by psychologists in the years after Szondi's death, recent discoveries in evolutionary psychology might be bringing it back in a revised form, through the study of homogamy and psychopathology.
