= Rose Ausländer =

Jewish poet and author (1901–1988)

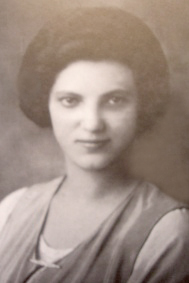
- Born: Rosalie Beatrice Scherzer; May 11, 1901; Czernowitz, Duchy of Bukovina, Austria-Hungary
- Died: January 3, 1988 (aged 86); Düsseldorf, West Germany
- Citizenship: German, Romanian, US
- Occupations: poet, newspaper editor, bank clerk, foreign correspondent
- Spouse: Ignaz Ausländer (October 19, 1923 – 1931)
- Partner: Helios Hecht (1927–1934)
- Writing career
- Language: German, English, Yiddish, Hebrew
- Years active: 1921–1986
- Genres: expressionism, Neue Sachlichkeit, modern poetry
- Subjects: nature, homeland, shoah, love and death
- Notable work: Blinder Sommer

Rose Ausländer (born Rosalie Beatrice Scherzer; May 11, 1901 – January 3, 1988) was a Jewish poet writing in German and English. Born in Czernowitz in the Bukovina, she lived through its tumultuous history of belonging to the Austro-Hungarian Empire, Kingdom of Romania, and eventually the Soviet Union. Rose Ausländer spent her life in several countries: Austria-Hungary, Romania, the United States, and West Germany.

== Biography ==
=== Early life and education, 1901–1920 ===
Rose Ausländer was born in Czernowitz, Bukovina (now Chernivtsi, Ukraine), to a German-speaking Jewish family. At the time Czernowitz was part of the Austro-Hungarian Empire. Her father Sigmund (Süssi) Scherzer (1871–1920) was from a small town near Czernowitz, and her mother Kathi Etie Rifke Binder (1873–1947) was born in Czernowitz to a German-speaking family. From 1907, she went to school in Czernowitz. In 1916, her family fled the Imperial Russian Army to Vienna but returned to Czernowitz in 1920, which had become part of the Kingdom of Romania and was known as Cernăuți after 1918.

In 1919, she began studying literature and philosophy in Cernăuți. At this time, she developed a lifelong interest in the philosopher Constantin Brunner. After her father died in 1920 she left university.

=== Minneapolis & New York, 1921–1927 ===
In 1921, she immigrated to the United States with her university friend, and future husband, Ignaz Ausländer. In Minneapolis, she worked as an editor for the German language newspaper Westlicher Herold and was a collaborator of the anthology Amerika-Herold-Kalender, in which she published her first poems. In 1922, she moved with Ausländer to New York City, where they were married on October 19, 1923. She separated from Ausländer three years later aged 25, but kept his last name. She became an American citizen in 1926. In the cycle of poems New York (1926–27), the expressionism of her early work yields to a cool-controlled language of Neue Sachlichkeit. Her interest in the ideas of Baruch Spinoza inspired philosopher Constantin Brunner, next to Plato, Sigmund Freud and others is a topic of later essays, that he disappeared.

=== Cernauti and New York 1926–1931 ===
In 1926, she returned for two years home to Cernăuți to take care of her sick mother. There, she met graphologist Helios Hecht, who became her partner. In 1928, she went back to New York with Hecht. She published poems in the "New Yorker Volkszeitung" and in the Cernauti-based socialist daily Vorwärts until 1931.

=== Cernauti 1931–1945 ===
In 1931, she returned to look after her mother again, working for the newspaper Czernowitzer Morgenblatt until 1940. She lost her US citizenship by 1934, because she had not been in the US for more than 3 years. She separated from Hecht that year. She was in a relationship with Hecht until 1936, when she left for Bucharest.

At the beginning of 1939, she traveled to Paris and New York, but once more returned to Cernăuți to take care of her sick mother. In 1939, her first volume of poems, Der Regenbogen (The Rainbow) was published with the help of her mentor, the Bukovinian writer Alfred Margul-Sperber. Even though critics received it favorably, it was not accepted by the public. The greater part of the print run was destroyed when Nazi Germany occupied Cernauti in 1941.

From October 1941–1944, she worked as a forced laborer (Zwangsarbeiter) in the ghetto of Cernauti. She remained there with her mother and brother for two years, and another year in hiding so as not to be deported to the Nazi concentration camps.

In the spring of 1943 Ausländer met poet Paul Celan in the Cernăuți ghetto. He later used Ausländer's image of "black milk" of a 1939 poem in his well-known poem Todesfuge published in 1948. Ausländer herself is recorded as saying that Celan's usage was "self-explanatory, as the poet may take all material to transmute in his own poetry. It's an honour to me that a great poet found a stimulus in my own modest work". 4 In the spring of 1944, the Bukowina became part of the Soviet Union. Ausländer worked in the Cernăuți city library until September 1944.

=== New York, 1944–1966 ===
In October 1944, Ausländer returned to live in New York. In 1947, her mother died and Ausländer suffered a physical collapse. From 1948 to 1956, Ausländer wrote her poems only in English. From 1953 to 1961, she made a living by working as a foreign correspondent at a shipping company in New York, and obtained US citizenship again in 1948.

While attending the New York City Writer's Conference at Wagner College, Staten Island, Ausländer met poet Marianne Moore. This was the beginning of a friendship documented in several letters, in which Moore advised Ausländer on her writing and finally encouraged her to return to writing poetry in German. Several of Ausländer's English poems are dedicated to Moore.

In 1957, she met Paul Celan in Paris again, with whom she discussed modern poetry, poem and shoah. She returned to her mother tongue. Celan encouraged her "to radically change her poetic style, which had been solemn and plangent, influenced by Hölderlin and Trakl, yielding to a no-frills, ever more musical-rhythmic clarity". In 1963, she spent time in Vienna, where she published her first book since 1939. The public welcomed Blinder Sommer (Blind summer) enthusiastically.

=== Düsseldorf, 1967–1988 ===
In 1967, she remigrated to Europe. After an unsuccessful attempt to settle in Vienna, she finally moved to Düsseldorf. She first lived in a pension on Poensgenstraße 9 near the rail road station. She was invited to read her poems at the legendary Oberkasseler pub Sassafras. Here she created her expansive late work in rapid sequence and several major pushes. After an accident she moved in the Nelly Sachs Home for the elderly starting in 1972. Severely affected by arthritis and bedridden from 1978 onward she still created a large part of her work, dictating her texts until 1986, as she was not able to write by herself. She died in Düsseldorf in 1988.

== Works ==
Ausländer wrote more than 3000 poems, essentially revolving around the topics of "Heimat" (home land, Bukowina), childhood, relationship to her mother, Judaism (Holocaust, exile), language (as a medium of expression and of home), love, ageing and death. With any poem written after 1945 one has to consider that it is influenced by her experience of the Holocaust whether it directly deals with the topic or not. Ausländer lived in the hope that writing was still possible, not the least because she derived her identity from writing: "Wer bin ich / wenn ich nicht schreibe?" (Who am I / if not writing?).

- Der Regenbogen (The Rainbow), 1939.
- Blinder Sommer (Blind Summer), 1965.
- Brief aus Rosen (Letter from Rosa/Letter from Roses)
- Das Schönste (The most beautiful)
- Denn wo ist Heimat? (Then Where is the Homeland)
- Die Musik ist zerbrochen (The Music is Broken)
- Die Nacht hat zahllose Augen (The Night Has Countless Eyes)
- Die Sonne fällt (The Sun Fails)
- Gelassen atmet der Tag (The Day Breathes Calmly)
- Hinter allen Worten (Behind All Words)
- Sanduhrschritt (Hourglass Pace)
- Schattenwald (Shadow Forest)
- Schweigen auf deine Lippen (Silence on Your Lips)
- The Forbidden Tree
- Treffpunkt der Winde (Meetingplace of the Wind)
- Und nenne dich Glück (And Call You Luck)
- Wir pflanzen Zedern (We Plant Cedars)
- Wir wohnen in Babylon (We Live in Babylon)
- Wir ziehen mit den dunklen Flüssen (We Row the Dark Rivers)
- Herbst in New York (Autumn in New York)
- An ein Blatt (To a Leaf)
- Anders II

=== Posthumous work ===
- Poems of Rose Auslander. An Ark of Stars (Translated by Ingeborg Wald, Drawings by Ed Colker, Haybarn Press 1989)
- Rose Auslander: Twelve Poems, Twelve Paintings (Translated by Ingeborg Wald, Paintings Adrienne Yarme, Ithaca, NY 1991)
- Dánta le Rose Ausländer (Translated into Irish by Isobel Ní Riain, Coiscéim, Dublin, 2023)

== Sources ==
- This article draws on the corresponding German Wikipedia article retrieved January 22, 2005.
