= Fluntern Cemetery =

Cemetery in Zürich, Switzerland

Coordinates: 47.383°N 8.571°E

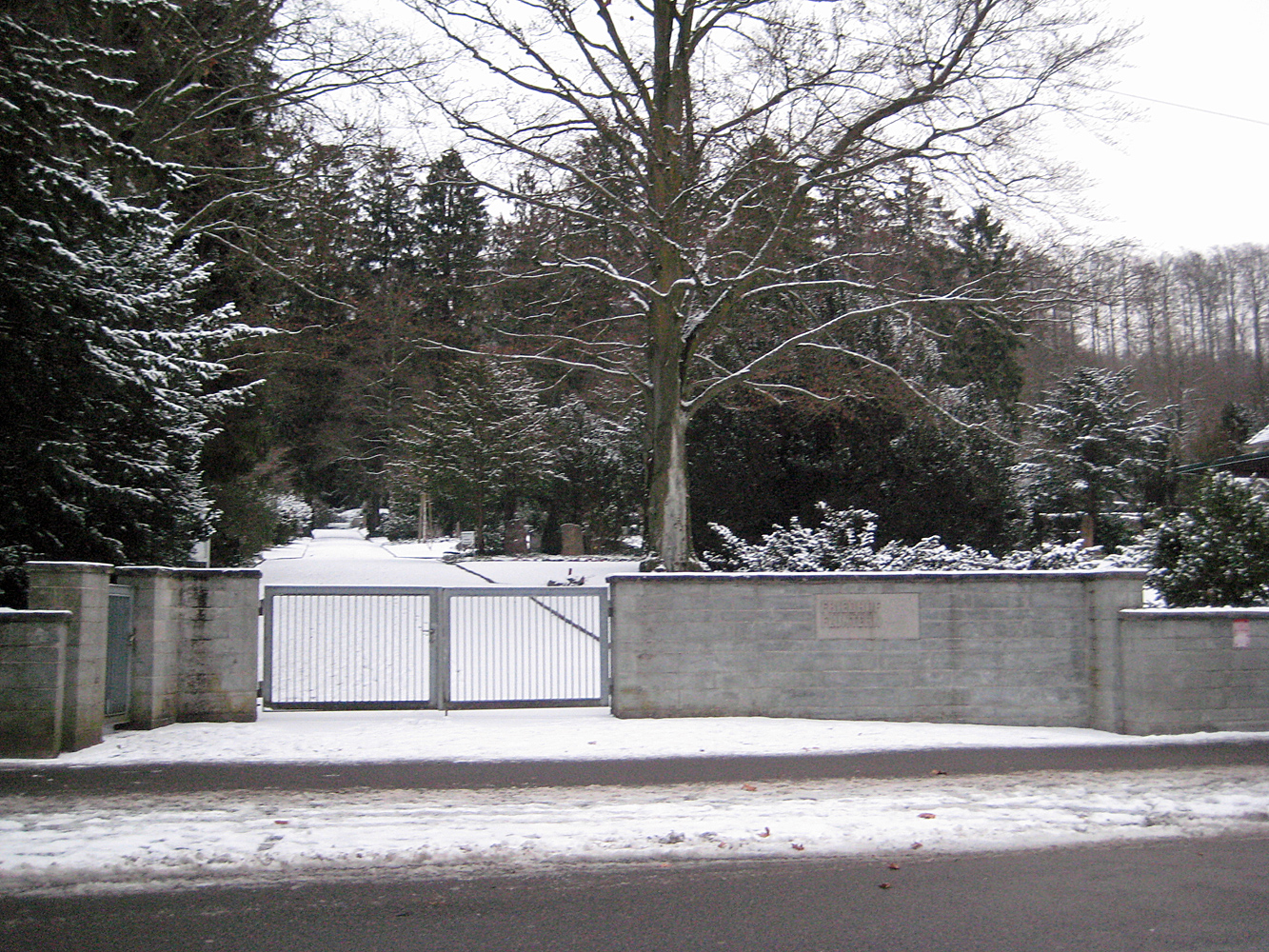
trumb

Also known as Friedhof Fluntern, the Fluntern Cemetery is located in the Zürichberg district of Zürich.

== Notable interments ==
- Emil Abderhalden (1877–1950), Swiss biochemist and physiologist
- Johann Ludwig Aberli (1723–1786), Swiss artist
- Thomas Ammann (1950–1993), Swiss art dealer
- Anita Augspurg (1857–1943), German lawyer, actor, writer and feminist
- Nora Barnacle (1884–1951), wife of James Joyce
- Elias Canetti (1905–1994), Bulgarian-born modernist novelist, playwright
- Therese Giehse (1898–1975), German actress
- Friedrich Hegar (1841–1927), Swiss composer, conductor, violinist
- James Joyce (1882–1941), Irish novelist and poet
- Paul Karrer (1889–1971), Swiss organic chemist, won the Nobel Prize for Chemistry in 1937
- Daniel Keel (1930–2011), Swiss publisher, founder of Diogenes Verlag
- Warja Lavater (1913–2007), Swiss artist and illustrator
- Albert Meyer (1870–1953), Swiss politician
- Karl Moser (1860–1936), Swiss architect
- Wilhelm Oechsli (1851–1919), Swiss historian
- Leopold Ružička (1887–1976), Croatian scientist, winner of the 1939 Nobel Prize in Chemistry
- Max Rychner (1897–1965), Swiss journalist and author
- Paul Scherrer (1890–1969), Swiss physicist
- Léopold Szondi (1893–1986), Hungarian psychiatrist
- Péter Szondi (1929–1971), Hungarian literary scholar
- Sigmund Widmer (1919–2003), Swiss historian, writer and politician
