= Antoine Vergote =

Belgian philosopher

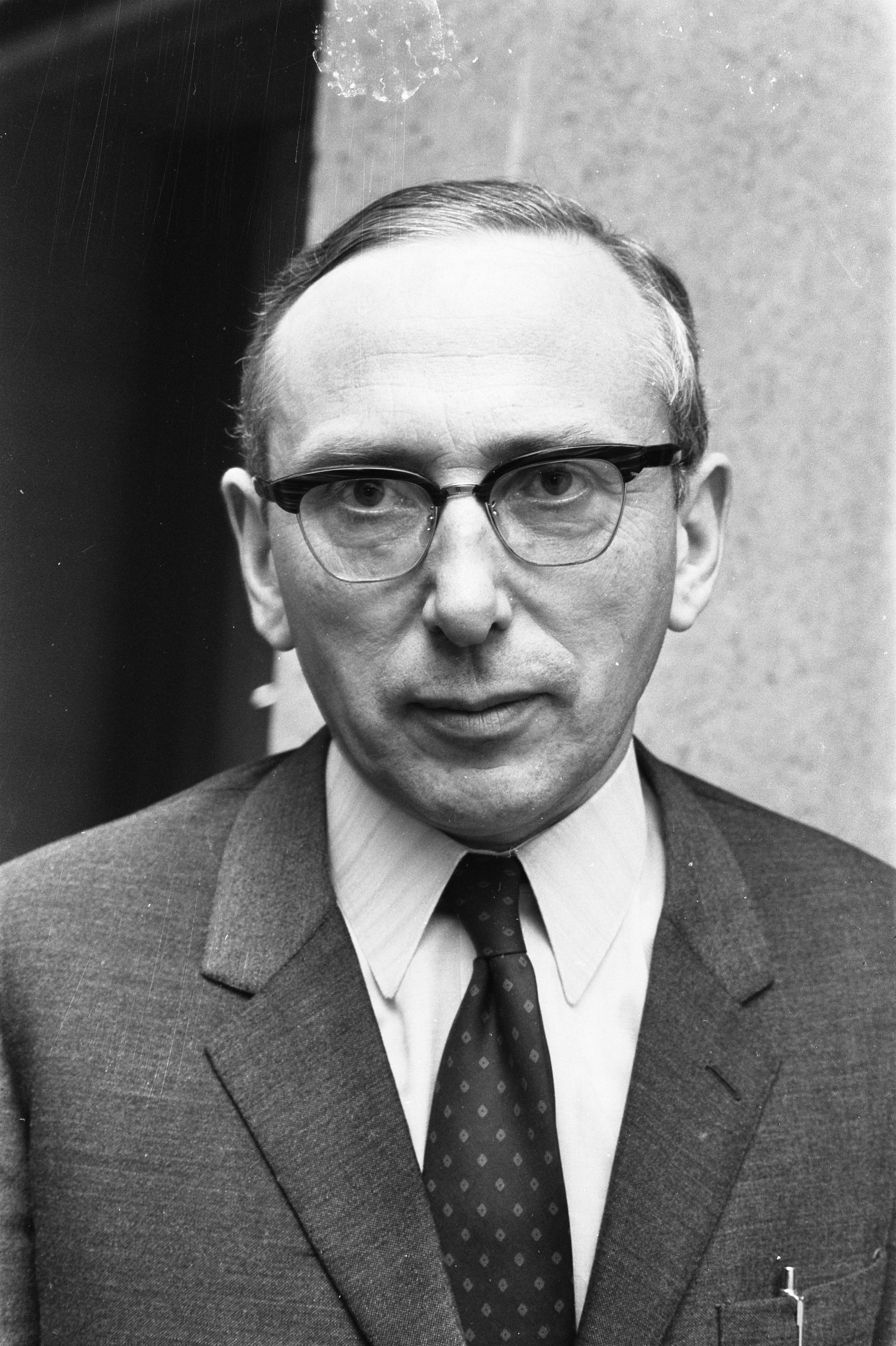

Antoine Vergote (8 December 1921 – 10 October 2013), also known as Antoon Vergote, was a Belgian Roman Catholic priest, theologian, philosopher, psychologist and psychoanalyst. He was an Emeritus Professor at the Catholic University of Leuven. His extensive publications span multiple disciplines including psychoanalysis, hermeneutics, philosophical anthropology, linguistics, theology, cultural anthropology, and phenomenology.

Vergote has been acclaimed "the most eminent figure in the field of the psychology of religion" and "a key figure" in European intellectual movements during the 20th century.

== Early life ==
Antoine Vergote was born on 8 December 1921, in the Belgian city of Courtray in the Flemish province of West Flanders. After receiving his graduate degrees from the University of Louvain in 1954, he continued his education in Paris where he studied with Levi-Strauss, attended the lectures of Merleau-Ponty, and completed his analytic training under the direction of Jacques Lacan.

== Psychoanalysis and religion ==
Vergote was a former student of the French psychiatrist and psychoanalyst Jacques Lacan and played an important role introducing psychoanalysis to the University of Leuven. He was the founder, along with Jacques Schotte and Alphonse de Waelhens, of the Belgian School of psychoanalysis. He has published many articles and books on the relationship between psychoanalysis and faith. He has attempted to refute those who view religion as a neurosis by showing that the tools of psychoanalysis can be used to elicit an experience of compassion and sensitivity capable of revealing truth and of giving meaning to human history as reflected in the life of Jesus of Nazareth.

Vergote's interest in psychoanalysis evolved from his philosophical background. In 1958 Vergote had already published an article on the question of why philosophers should be interested in Freudian psychoanalysis, especially those interested in Husserl's phenomenology. This phenomenology would be a returning point of reference throughout his writings.

One of Vergote's best known studies, Guilt and Desire (Dette et désir), is concerned with the two main neuroses, hysteria and obsessional neurosis in relation to religion, and analysed from a Freudian-Lacanian perspective. Vergote rejects Freud's view of religion as a collective neurosis, as well as his genetic explanation of religion. The core of Vergote's critique of Freud's Totem and Taboo is the problem of how obedience to the Law (interiorised in the superego) and guilt can emerge in a primitive society without Law or faith. In Vergote's view, writes H. Westerlink, the obedience and guilt can only be established by a Law. In other words, culture cannot originate from guilt, because, vice versa, guilt presupposes culture. Vergote's "marvellous and classic" study includes an in-depth treatise of several catholic mystics such as Teresa of Ávila.

== Psychology and religion ==
Vergote has written extensively on the subject of the psychology of religion, as distinct from his psychoanalytic perspective. Vergote views religion as a cultural reality or phenomenon and defines it as "the entirety of the linguistic expressions, emotions, actions and signs that refer to a supernatural being or supernatural beings". In characterising this viewpoint of religion, Vergote pays tribute to Clifford Geertz. Vergote focuses primarily on Christianity because, he writes, it is the dominant religion of our (Western) culture and the majority of psychological studies to date relate to Christian populations. However, he also acknowledges that if one wishes to study religion from the psychological point of view, one must then speak about unbelief or atheism. "Unbelief, insofar as it is not a pure absence of religious questions or interests, is equally a response to the question addressed to humankind by religion".

Although he is a religious man himself, Vergote's aim is not to defend any form of religion.

== Works ==
=== French ===
- La psychanalyse, science de l'homme (Charles Dessart, 1970)
- Psychologie religieuse (Charles Dessart, 1971)
- Interprétation du langage religieux (éd. du Seuil, 1974)
- Dette et désir (éd. du Seuil, 1978)
- Religion, foi incroyance (Liège, 1983)
- La psychanalyse à l'épreuve de la sublimation (éd. du Cerf, 1997)
- Modernité et christianisme (éd. du Cerf, 1999)
- Humanité de l'homme, divinité de Dieu (2007)
- La psychanalyse devant la schizophrénie (éd. du Cerf, 2011)

=== English ===
- Religious Man: Psychological Study of Religious Attitudes (Gill & Macmillan, 1969).
- Parental Figures and the Representation of God: A Psychological and Cross-Cultural Study (Walter de Gruyter, 1978)
- Guilt and desire. Religious Attitudes and Their Pathological Derivations (New Haven, 1987). (Dette et désir. Deux axes chrétiens et la dérive pathologique).
- Religion, Belief and Unbelief. A Psychological Study (Leuven University Press, 1996). ISBN 90-6186-751-7 (Religion, foi, incroyance. Étude psychologique)
- Psychoanalysis, Phenomenological Anthropology and Religion (Leuven / Amsterdam /Atlanta 1998).

== Appreciation ==
Vergote has been acclaimed "the most eminent figure in the field of the psychology of religion" whose "deep understanding of the psychodynamics analysis of the religious attitude was supported not only by his vast knowledge of philosophical and theological anthropology (Vergote, 1974), but also by the vast and refined empirical analysis which he himself conducted". In the view of Professor Jacob Belzen (University of Amsterdam), Vergote is "a key figure" in European intellectual movements during the 20th century.

His influence on both the psychology of religion, and in philosophy, in the Netherlands has been profound due to publications and translations into Dutch and due to the fact that some of his students pursued academic careers in Leuven or the Netherlands. In this respect, Vergote has been called the "godfather of the second major 'school' in the Dutch speaking psychology of religion".

In 1998, Vergote was made an honorary member of the Italian Society of the Psychology of Religion (Società Italiana di Psicologia della Religione).
