= Sprachgitter =

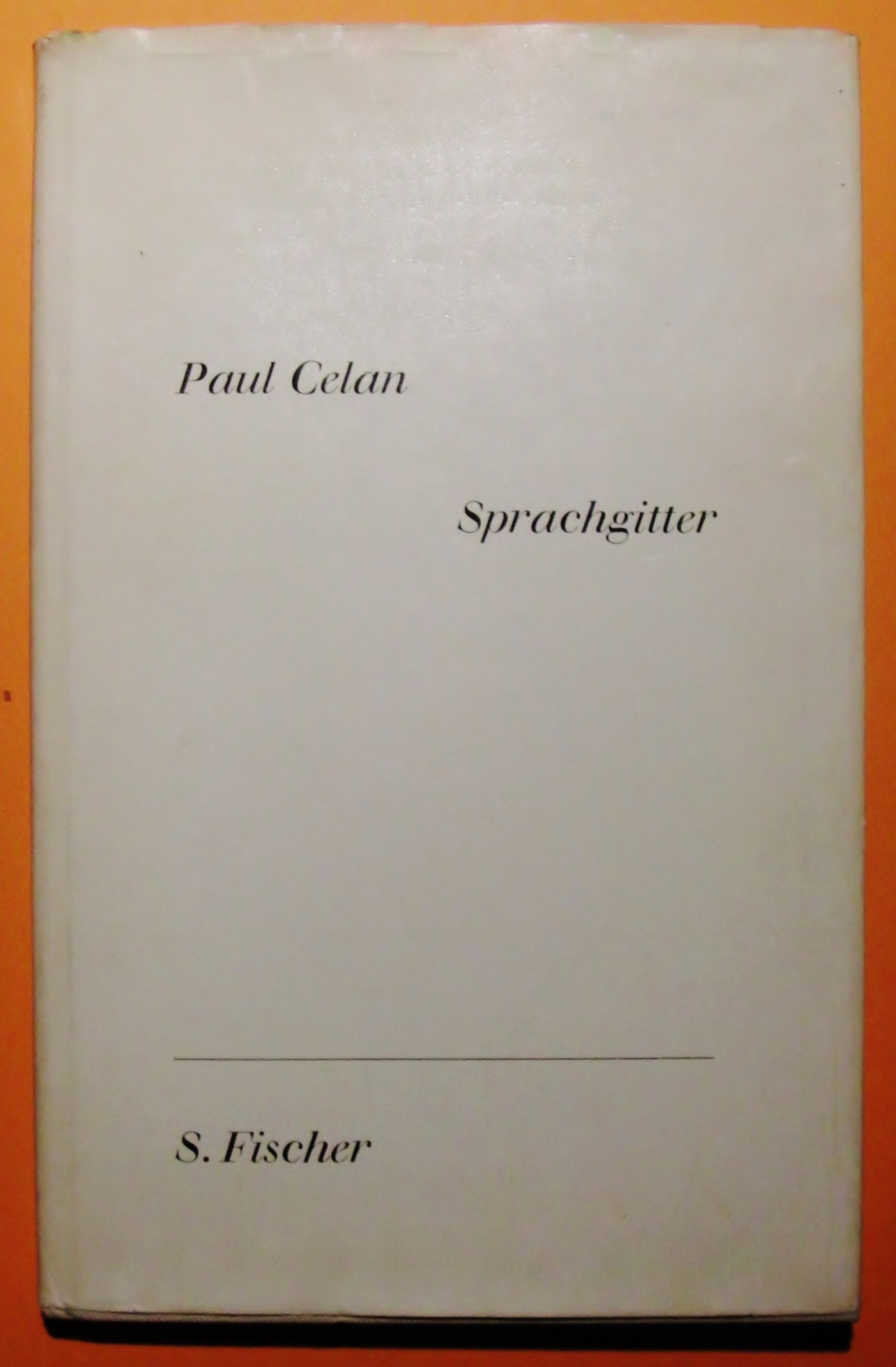
- First edition (S. Fischer Verlag, 1959)
- Author: Paul Celan
- Translators: Joachim Groschel (1971), Michael Hamburger (1988)
- Language: German
- Publisher: S. Fischer Verlag
- Publication date: 1959
- English publication date: 1971, 1988
- Pages: 67

Sprachgitter is a 1959 German-language poetry collection by Paul Celan, published by S. Fischer Verlag. It was translated to English by Joachim Groschel in 1971 as Speech-Grille, and as Language Mesh by Michael Hamburger in 1988.
