= Lichtzwang =

1970 German-language poetry collection by Paul Celan

- Title page for Lichtzwang (1970)
- Author: Paul Celan
- Translator: Pierre Joris
- Language: German
- Publisher: Suhrkamp Verlag
- Publication date: July 1970
- English publication date: Green Integer, 2005
- Pages: 108

Lichtzwang (rendered in English as Lightduress) is a 1970 German-language poetry collection by Paul Celan. It was written in 1967 and published three months after Celan's death. It was published in an English translation in 2005 by Green Integer.

== Publication ==
The book was published in Germany in 1970 through Suhrkamp Verlag. In 2005, an English-language translation by Pierre Joris was published. Joris won the American PEN Award for Poetry in Translation for the book; the motivation said that "The translations are consistently alert to the subtle and often bewildering thought-turns of the original, his lyric sense of pause, suspension and onrush can keep pace with the German, and his vast knowledge of Celan's life and world allow vital commentary and annotations. ... [T]his volume is everything a poetic translation should be."

== Reception ==
Mark Glanville reviewed the book in Jewish Quarterly in 2005: "In the terse economy of Lichtzwang language has become as constricted as the divine light captured in the kabbalistic kelippot (shells) that Celan alludes to elsewhere, and to which the title of this collection might well refer. We are aware of the poet's battle against the dying of the light, one he eventually lost, but the quality and nature of the struggle is such as to leave us with a body of work by which we continue to be illuminated and inspired."

== See also ==
- 1970 in poetry
