= Nan Rosenthal =

American art historian

Nan Rosenthal (August 27, 1937 – April 27, 2014) was an American art historian.

== Early life and education ==
Born in 1937 in Manhattan, she earned a bachelor's degree from Sarah Lawrence College.

Rosenthal pursued graduate studies in art history at Harvard University, obtaining a master's degree in 1970 and a Ph.D. in 1976. She taught art history at several institutions, including the University of California, Santa Cruz; Princeton University; and New York University.

== Career ==
Rosenthal began her career as a reporter for newspapers such as The New York Post, The Evening Standard, and The International Herald Tribune.

In 1985, Rosenthal joined the National Gallery of Art as a curator of 20th-century art. She organized exhibitions such as "Box in a Valise" by Marcel Duchamp in 1989 and a Jasper Johns drawing exhibition in 1990. She also facilitated the acquisition of works by artists like Barnett Newman, Ad Reinhardt, and Scott Burton.

From 1993 until her retirement in 2008, she was associated with the Metropolitan Museum of Art as a senior consultant for modern and contemporary art. At the Met, she was involved in acquiring works such as Jasper Johns's White Flag and Robert Rauschenberg's Winter Pool. She also work on exhibitions such as "Jackson Pollock: Early Sketchbooks and Drawings" (1997), "Anselm Kiefer: Works on Paper 1969–1993" (1998), "Chuck Close Prints: Process and Collaboration" (2004), and "Jasper Johns: Gray" (2008).

== Personal life ==
Rosenthal first marriage ended in divorce. In 1990, she married Henry Benning Cortesi. She resided on the Upper East Side of Manhattan.

== Bibliography ==
- Painting From 1850 to the Present (1976)
- George Rickey (1977)
- Terry Winters: Printed Works (2001)
