= Schneepart =

- Author: Paul Celan
- Translator: Ian Fairley (English), and others.
- Language: German
- Publisher: Suhrkamp Verlag
- Publication date: 1971
- English publication date: 2007
- Pages: 95

Schneepart (rendered in English as Snow Part) is a 1971 German-language poetry collection by Paul Celan. It was published in an English translation in 2007.

== Publication ==
The book was published in Germany posthumously in 1971 by Suhrkamp Verlag. 24 of the 70 poems were translated to English by Katharine Washburn and Margret Guillemin for the 1986 collection of Celan in English, Last Poems. The full work appeared in English, together with translations of a further 20 posthumous poems, in 2007 as Snow Part: Schneepart and Other Poems, in a translation by Ian Fairley, which won the Schlegel-Tieck Prize for translation from German. Fairley states in his introduction that the 'part' of the title should be interpreted as meaning 'the role of snow' rather than 'a constituent element of snow'.

== Reception ==
James Buchan of The Guardian wrote in 2007 of Ian Fairley's translation of the poems: "I do not think that Celan was a sort of verse Heinrich Böll, who set himself to rid written German of National Socialist patterns of speech and writing....Only when language is utterly disabled, it seems, can it articulate, in some abandoned region at the end of space and history, a fugitive echo of reality." Buchan continued: "The language of Schneepart is not merely purged of inherited content or meaning. It has shed all logic. ... Some of Fairley's versions are extremely beautiful...."
