= Heinz Wismann =

German classical philologist

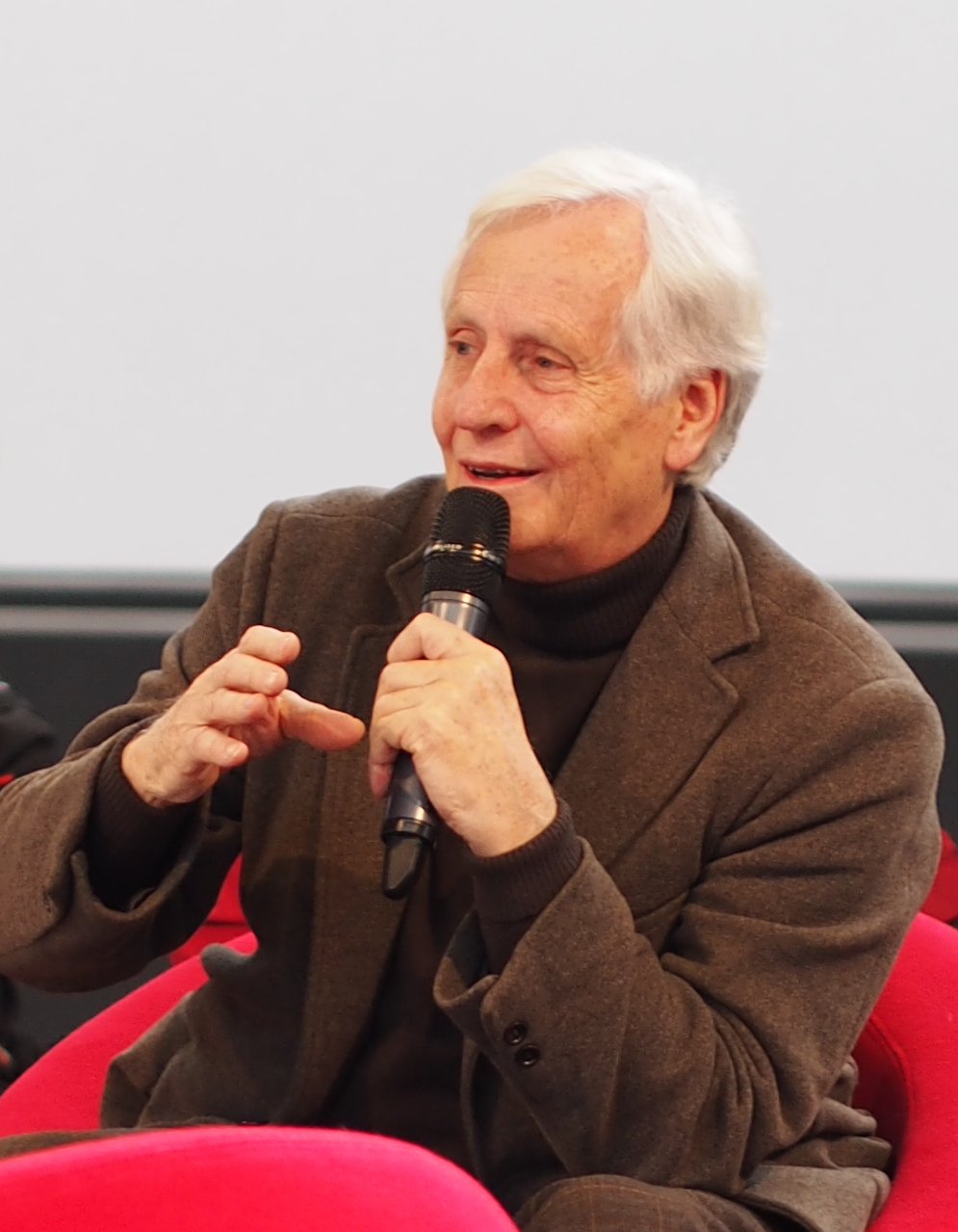
Heinz Wismann in 2013

Heinz Wismann (born 1935 in Berlin) is a Franco-German philologist and philosopher.

== Biography ==
Wismann is the son of Heinz Wismann (1897–1945), an art historian, who was director of the Ministry of Education and Propaganda and vice-president of the Chamber of Literature of the Third Reich from 1935 to 1937.

As a Hellenist, Heinz Wismann has long been associated with the Lille school.

Director of Emeritus Studies at Georg Simmel centre of the School for Advanced Studies in the Social Sciences (EHESS), his research focuses on hermeneutics and the history of German thought. He directed the "Passages" collection of the Éditions du Cerf from 1986 to 2007. The title was an homage to the writer Walter Benjamin, whom he introduced to France.

A European spirit, a builder of peace between peoples, he reflected a great deal on languages, in the "beyond" of languages, on European traditions and cultures, in order to maintain their difficult cohesion between them, while preserving their differences and their singularities, despite their contradictions. He is a friend of Jean Bollack, philologist and philosopher with whom he has worked extensively in the fields of philology and Hellenism.

== Controversy ==
On March 21, 2019, Heinz Wismann stated on France Culture that:

Esperanto did not take because it is not an evolving language, saying "It was conceived as a closed language and nobody wants to use it",

triggering the anger of certain Esperantists believing that the remarks which he made are false.
