= Jean Bollack =

French philosopher, philologist and literary critic (1923-2012)

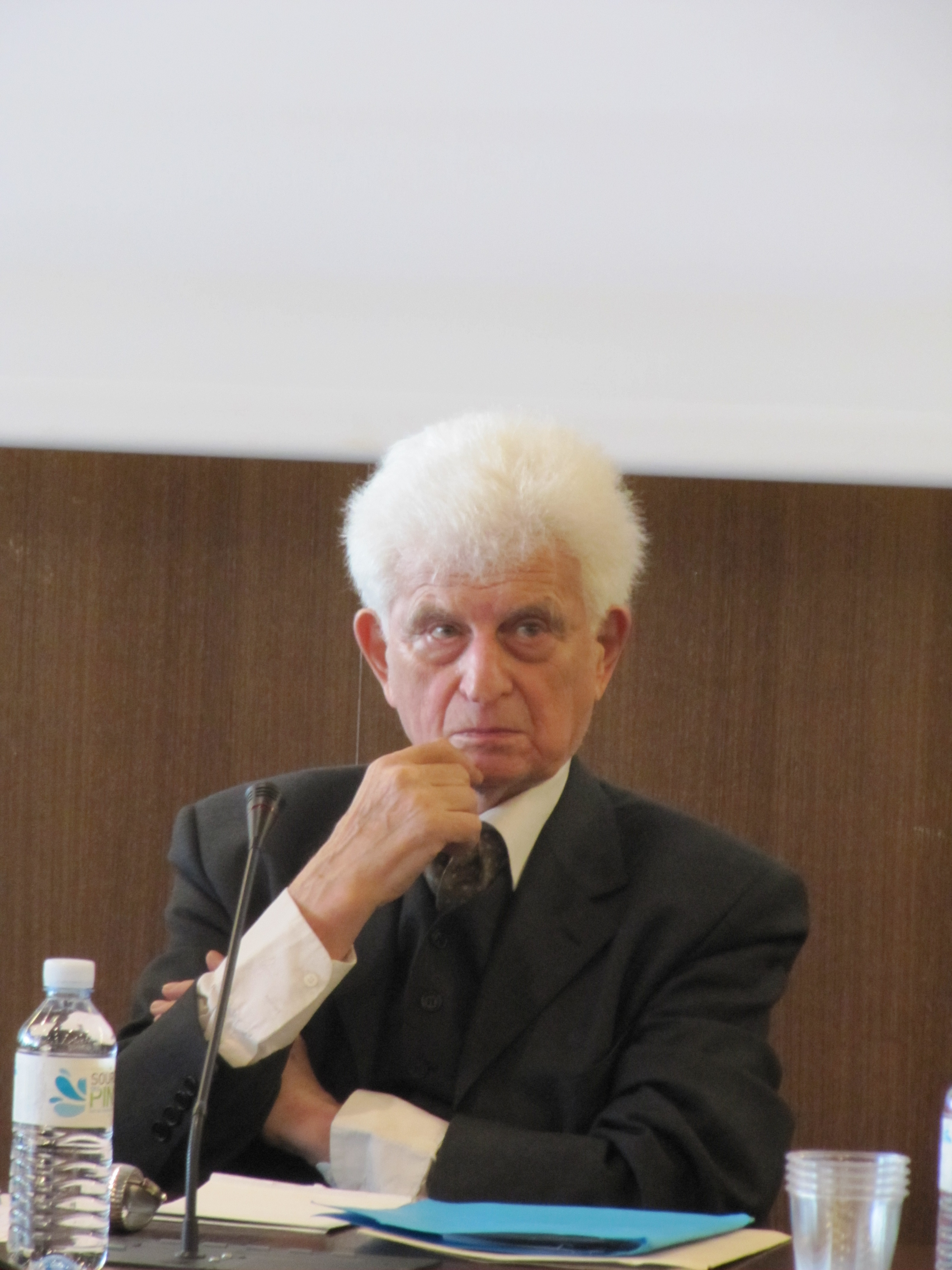
- Bollack in 2011
- Born: 15 March 1923; Strasbourg, Grand Est, France
- Died: 4 December 2012 (aged 89); Paris, Ile-de-France, France
- Occupations: Philosopher; Philologist; Literary critic
- Spouse: Mayotte Bollack

Jean Bollack (15 March 1923 – 4 December 2012) was a French philosopher, philologist and literary critic.

== Biography ==
He first studied classical philology at the University of Basel, among others with Peter von der Mühll and Albert Béguin, and from 1945 at the University of Paris where he began working under the direction of Hellenist Pierre Chantraine.

He then established the "Centre de recherche philologique" in Lille, which he ran for some years and to which his friend Heinz Wismann participated. According to Barbara Cassin, his philological work is remarkable for its "extraordinary textual vigilance".

In addition to his work as a Hellenist with his wife and collaborator Mayotte Bollack, he has published studies on the poetry of Paul Celan. He is considered one of the most penetrating commentators on Celan.

== Publications ==
- Empédocle 1 : « Introduction à l'ancienne physique », Paris, Éditions de Minuit, coll. "Le sens commun", 1965, (rééd. des 3 volumes) coll. Tel Éditions Gallimard.
- Empédocle 2 : « Les Origines », edition and translation of fragments and testimonies, Paris, Minuit, coll. "Le sens commun", 1969. Tel Gallimard.
- Empédocle 3 : « Les Origines: commentaire », commentary, Paris, Minuit, coll. "Le sens commun", 1969. Tel Gallimard.
- Héraclite ou la séparation, in collaboration with Heinz Wismann, Paris, Minuit, coll. "Le sens commun", 1972. [Reference book]
- La Pensée du plaisir. Epicure : textes moraux, commentaire, Paris, Minuit, 1975.
- La Grèce de personne : les mots sous le mythe, Paris, Éditions du Seuil, coll. "L'ordre philosophique", 1997.
- Euripides, Iphigénie à Aulis, transl. in coll. with Mayotte Bollack, Paris, Minuit, 1990.
- Pierre de cœur, (unpublished poem by Paul Celan), Pierre Fanlac Éditeur, 1991.
- Euripides, Andromaque, transl. in coll. with Mayotte Bollack, Paris, Minuit, 1994.
- La naissance d’Œdipe, (translation and comment of Œdipus Rex), Gallimard, 1995.
- Euripides, Hélène, transl. in coll. with Mayotte Bollack, Paris, Minuit, 1997.
- Sophocles, Antigone, trans. in coll. with Mayotte Bollack, Paris, Minuit, 1999.
- Sens contre sens. Comment lit-on? Interview with Patrick Llored. La Passe du vent, 2000.
- Poésie contre poésie (Celan et la littérature), PUF, "Perspectives germaniques", 2001.
- Piedra de corazón. Un poema póstumo de Paul Celan. With the help of Arnau Pons. Madrid, Arena Libros, 2002.
- L'écrit. Une poétique dans l'œuvre de Celan, PUF, "Perspectives germaniques", 2003.
- Euripides, Les Bacchantes, transl. in coll. with Mayotte Bollack, Paris, Minuit, 2004.
- Poesía contra poesía. Celan y la literatura. With the help of Arnau Pons. Madrid. Trotta, 2005.
- Jean Bollack (2005). Dionysos et la tragédie. Bayard.
- Jean Bollack (2006). Parmenide, de l'étant au monde. Lagrasse: Verdier poche. ISBN 286432475X.
- Abdelwahab Meddeb, Christian Jambet, Jean Bollack (2007). La conférence de Ratisbonne, Enjeux et controverses. Bayard. ISBN 978-2227476837.
- Jean Bollack (2011). L'Agamemnon d'Eschyle: Le texte et ses interprétations. Du Septentrion. ISBN 978-2859391874.
- Jean Bollack (2013). Au jour le jour. Paris. Presses Universitaires de France. ISBN 978-2130619055.

== See also ==
- Empedocles
- Heraclitus
- Parmenides
- Paul Celan
- Péter Szondi

== Bibliography ==
- Christoph König, Denis Thouard (éd.), La philologie au présent : pour Jean Bollack, Villeneuve-d'Ascq, Presses universitaires du Septentrion, 2010 (collection Cahiers de philologie)
- Christoph König, Heinz Wismann (éd.), "La lecture insistante. Autour de Jean Bollack", Paris, Albin Michel, 2011 (Colloque de Cerisy).
