= Mohn und Gedächtnis =

German-language poetry collection by Paul Celan

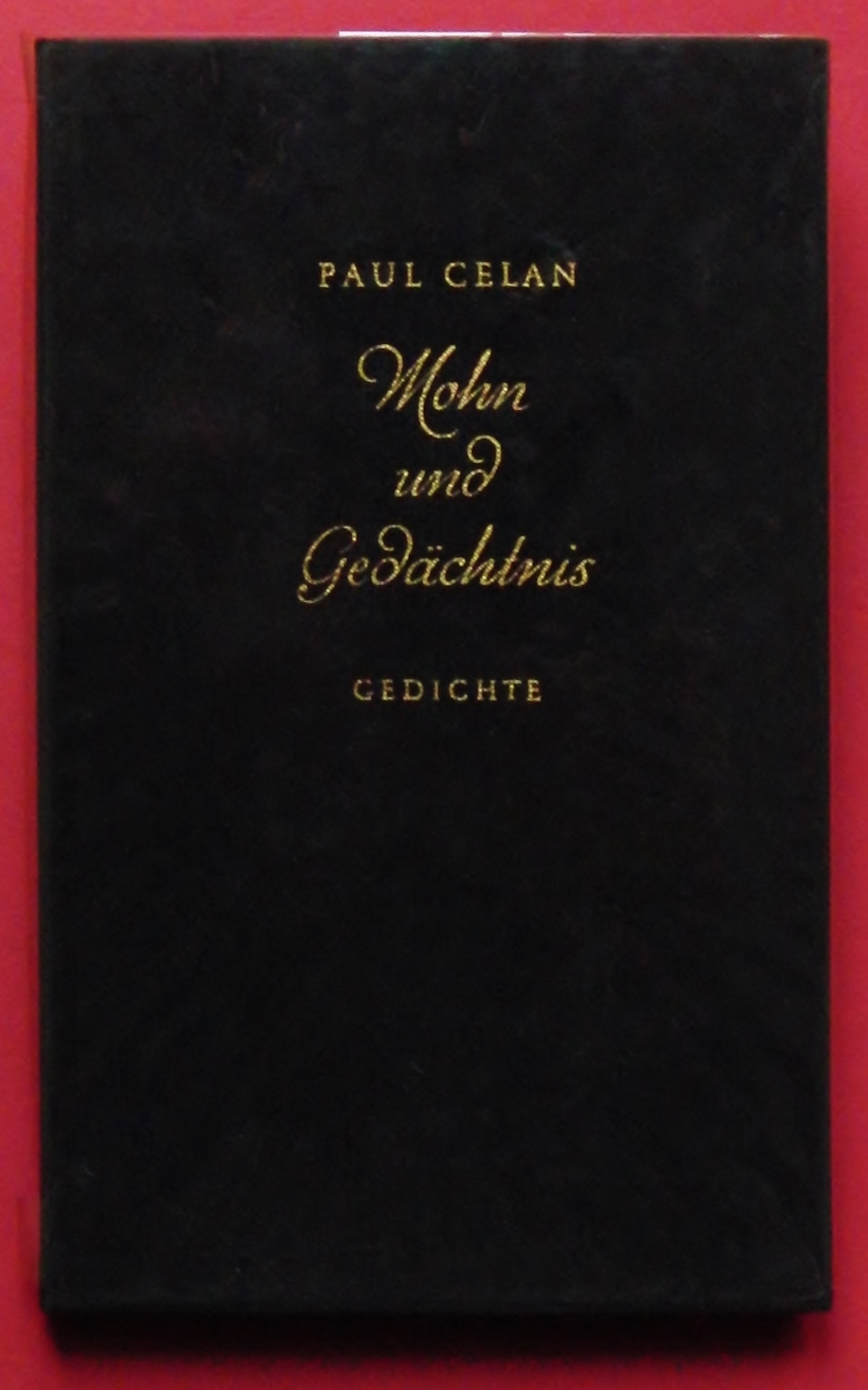
- First German-language edition (Deutsche Verlags-Anstalt 1952)
- Author: Paul Celan
- Translator: Michael Hamburger
- Language: German
- Publisher: Deutsche Verlags-Anstalt
- Publication date: 1952
- English publication date: 1988
- Pages: 75

Mohn und Gedächtnis is a 1952 German-language poetry collection by Paul Celan. It has been translated into English by Michael Hamburger as Poppy and Memory. It includes Todesfuge (Deathfugue), one of his best-known and often-anthologized poems.
