= Paul Celan =

German-language poet of Romanian birth, Holocaust survivor (1920–1970)

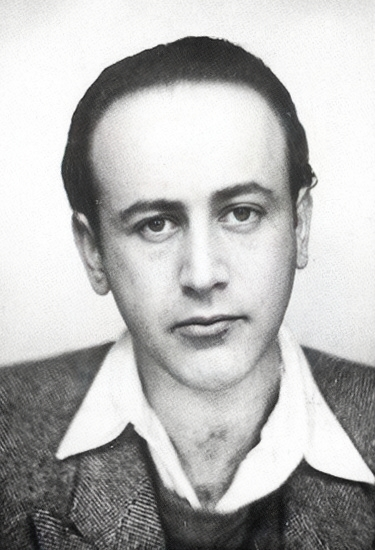
- Celan in 1938
- Born: Paul Antschel; 23 November 1920; Cernăuți, Kingdom of Romania (now Chernivtsi, Ukraine)
- Died: 20 April 1970 (aged 49); Paris, France
- Occupation: Writer
- Spouse: Gisèle Lestrange (m. 1952)
- Partner: Ingeborg Bachmann
- Children: 2
- Writing career
- Language: German; Romanian
- Genres: Poetry; translation
- Notable work: "Todesfuge"

Paul Celan (/ˈsɛlæn/; German: [ˈtseːlaːn]; born Paul Antschel; 23 November 1920 – c. 20 April 1970) was a German-speaking Romanian poet, Holocaust survivor, and literary translator. He adopted his pen name (an anagram of the Romanian spelling Ancel) following the war and resided in France from 1949, becoming a naturalized French citizen in 1955.

Celan is regarded as one of the most important figures in German-language literature of the post-World War II era and a poet whose verse has gained an immortal place in the literary pantheon. Celan's poetry, with its many radical poetic and linguistic innovations, is characterized by a complicated and cryptic style that deviates from poetic conventions.

== Life ==
=== Early life ===
Celan was born into a German-speaking Jewish family in Cernăuți, Bukovina, a region then part of Romania and earlier part of the Austro-Hungarian Empire (when his birthplace was known as Czernowitz). His first home was in the Wassilkogasse in Cernăuți. His father, Leo Antschel, was a Zionist who advocated his son's education in Hebrew at the Jewish school Safah Ivriah (meaning the Hebrew language). Celan's mother, Friederike (Fritzi) Antschel née Schrager, was an avid reader of German literature who insisted Austrian German be the language of the household. In his teens, Celan became active in Jewish Socialist organizations and fostered support for the Republican cause in the Spanish Civil War. His earliest known poem is titled Mother's Day 1938.

Paul attended the Liceul Ortodox de Băieți No. 1 (Boys' Orthodox Secondary School No. 1) from 1930 until 1935, Liceul de Băieți No. 2 în Cernăuți (Boys' Secondary School No. 2 in Cernăuți) from 1935 to 1936, followed by the Liceul Marele Voievod Mihai (Great Prince Mihai Preparatory School, now Chernivtsi School No. 5), where he studied from 1936 until graduating in 1938. At this time Celan secretly began to write poetry.

In 1938, Celan traveled to Tours, France, to study medicine; the Anschluss precluded his study in Vienna, and Romanian schools were harder to get into due to the newly imposed Jewish quota. His journey to France took him through Berlin as the events of Kristallnacht unfolded, and also introduced him to his uncle, Bruno Schrager, who was later among the French detainees murdered at Birkenau. Celan returned to Cernăuți in 1939 to study literature and Romance languages.

=== Life during World War II ===
Following the Soviet occupation of Bukovina in June 1940, deportations to Siberia started. A year later, following the reconquest by Romania, Nazi Germany and the then-fascist Romanian regime brought ghettos, internment, and forced labour (see Romania in World War II).

On arrival in Cernăuți in July 1941, the German SS Einsatzkommando and their Romanian allies set the city's Great Synagogue on fire. In October, the Romanians deported a large number of Jews after forcing them into a ghetto, where Celan translated Shakespeare's sonnets and continued to write his own poetry. Before the ghetto was dissolved in the fall of that year, Celan was pressed into labor, first clearing the debris of a demolished post office, and then gathering and destroying Russian books.

The local mayor, Traian Popovici, strove to mitigate the harsh circumstances, until the governor of Bukovina had the Jews rounded up and deported, starting on a Saturday night in June 1942. Celan hoped to convince his parents to leave the country so as to escape certain persecution. While Celan was away from home, on 21 June 1942, his parents were taken from their home and sent by train to an internment camp in Transnistria Governorate, where two-thirds of the deportees eventually perished. Celan's father likely perished of typhus and his mother was shot after being exhausted by forced labour. Later that year, after being taken to a labour camp in Romania, Celan received reports of his parents' deaths.

Celan remained imprisoned in a work camp until February 1944, when the Red Army's advance forced the Romanians to abandon the camps, whereupon he returned to Cernăuți shortly before the Soviets returned. There, he worked briefly as a nurse in the mental hospital. Friends from this period recall Celan expressing immense guilt over his separation from his parents, whom he had tried to convince to go into hiding prior to the deportations, shortly before their deaths.

=== Life after the war ===
Considering emigration to Palestine, Celan left Cernăuți in 1945 for Bucharest, where he remained until 1947. He was active in the Jewish literary community as both a translator of Russian literature into Romanian, and as a poet, publishing his work under a variety of pseudonyms. The literary scene of the time was richly populated with surrealists, such as Gellu Naum, Ilarie Voronca, Gherasim Luca, Paul Păun, and Dolfi Trost. It was in this period that Celan developed pseudonyms both for himself and his friends, including the one he took as his pen name. He also met with the poets Rose Ausländer and Immanuel Weissglas, elements of whose works he reused in his poem "Todesfuge", which first appeared as "Tangoul Morții" ("Death Tango") in a Romanian translation of May 1947.

=== Emigration and Paris years ===
Upon the emergence of the communist regime in Romania at the beginning of 1948, Celan fled Romania for Vienna, Austria. It was there that he befriended Ingeborg Bachmann, who had just completed a dissertation on Martin Heidegger. Celan, however, found only a ruined city divided between Allied powers and which bore little resemblance to the literary, musical, and cultural mecca it had been as the capital of the Austro-Hungarian Empire. Furthermore, the urbane, cultured, and sophisticated Viennese Jewish community described by Stefan Zweig in The World of Yesterday had been largely annihilated by the Holocaust in Austria. This is why, like the poet Heinrich Heine before him, Celan emigrated to Paris in 1948. In that year his first poetry collection, Der Sand aus den Urnen ("Sand from the Urns"), was published in Vienna by A. Sexl. His first few years in Paris were marked by intense feelings of loneliness and isolation, as expressed in letters to his colleagues, including his longtime friend from Cernăuți, Petre Solomon. It was also during this time that he exchanged many letters with Diet Kloos, a young singer and anti-Nazi Dutch Resistance veteran who had witnessed her husband of just a few months being tortured to death. She visited Celan twice in Paris between 1949 and 1951. During his stay in Paris, he became friends with Emil Cioran and Serge Moscovici.

In 1952, Celan's writing began to gain recognition when he read his poetry on his first reading trip to West Germany where he was invited to read at the semiannual meetings of the hugely influential Group 47 literary group. At their May meeting he read his poem Todesfuge ("Death Fugue"), a depiction of concentration camp life. When Ingeborg Bachmann, with whom Celan had an affair, won the group's prize for her poetry collection Die gestundete Zeit (The Extended Hours), Celan (whose work had received only six votes) said "After the meeting, only six people remembered my name". He did not attend any other meeting of the group.

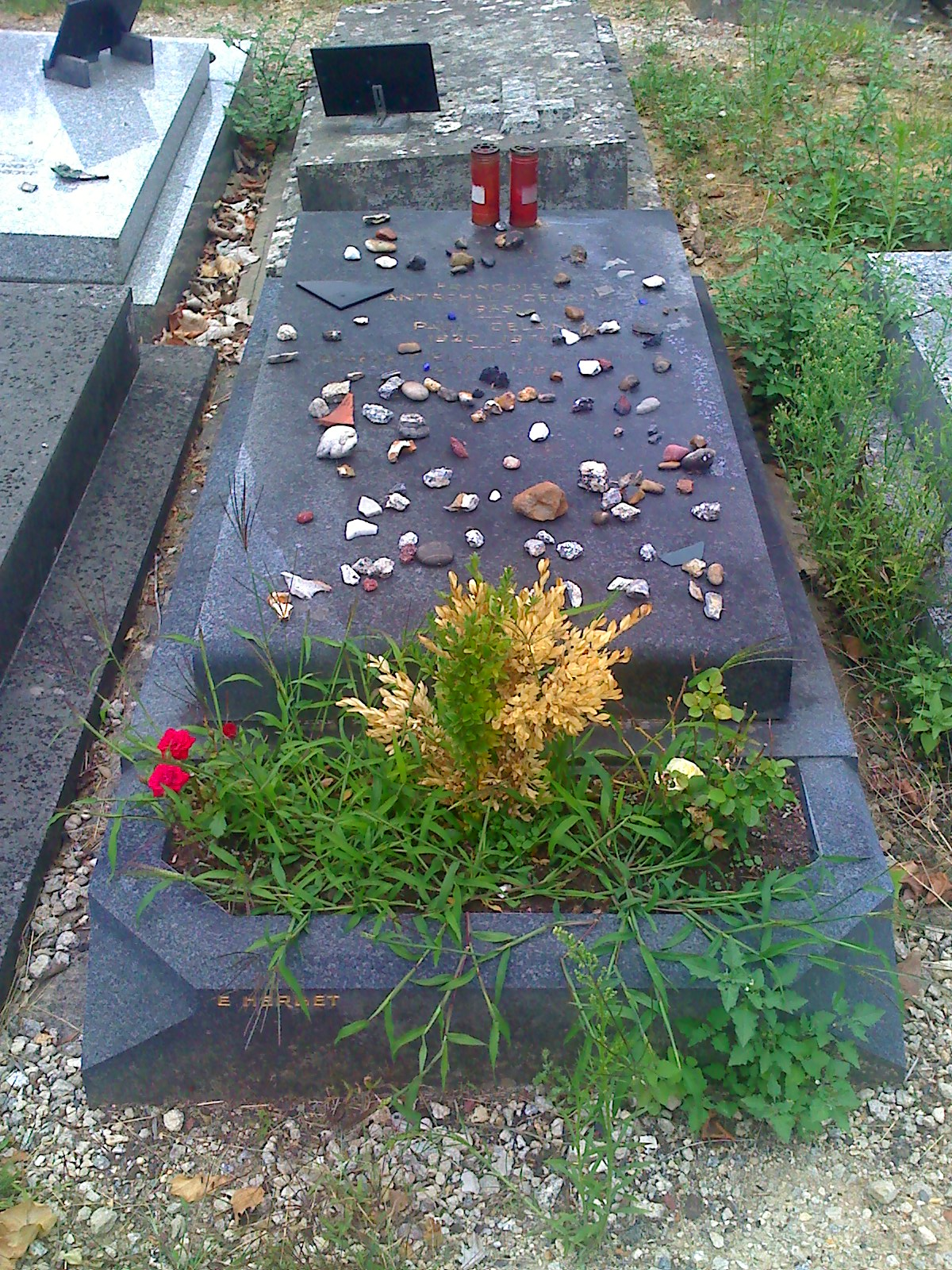
Celan's grave at the Cimetière de Thiais near Paris

In November 1951, he met the graphic artist Gisèle Lestrange, in Paris. He sent her many love letters, influenced by Franz Kafka's correspondence with Milena Jesenská and Felice Bauer. They married on 21 December 1952, despite the opposition of her aristocratic family. Their first child died a day after birth in 1953 and their second child, son Éric Celan, was born on 6 June 1955. During the following 18 years, they wrote over 700 letters; Celan's active correspondents also included Hermann Lenz and his wife Hanne. He made his living as a translator and lecturer in German at the École normale supérieure. He was a close friend of Nelly Sachs, who later won the Nobel Prize for literature.

Celan became a French citizen in 1955 and lived in Paris. Celan's sense of persecution increased after the widow of a friend, the French-German poet Yvan Goll, unjustly accused him of having plagiarised her husband's work. Celan was awarded the Bremen Literature Prize in 1958 and the Georg Büchner Prize in 1960.

Celan drowned in the river Seine in Paris around 20 April 1970. It may have been suicide, and if so, perhaps related to the appearance of Weissglas's poem, dated 1944, in the Romanian journal Neue Literatur, and fears that he might again be accused unfairly of plagiarism, the initial assertions about which, in 1953, later occasioned four psychotic episodes involving paranoia.

== Poetic style ==
In addition to writing poetry (in German and, earlier, in Romanian), he was an extremely active translator and polyglot, translating literature from Romanian, French, Spanish, Portuguese, Italian, Russian, Hebrew, and English into German. Meanwhile, Celan's own poetry became progressively more cryptic, fractured and monosyllabic, often deviating from conventional poetic meter and verse structures. He created and used German neologisms, especially in his later works Fadensonnen ("Threadsuns") and Lichtzwang. Celan has been seen as attempting either to destroy or remake the German language in his poetry, using it to convey dense imagery and subjective experiences; he described this stance in a letter to his wife Gisèle Lestrange as feeling as though "the German I talk is not the same as the language the German people are talking here".

The death of his parents and the trauma of the Holocaust are regarded by scholars as being defining forces in Celan's poetry and his use of language. In his Bremen Prize speech, Celan said of language after Auschwitz that:

Only one thing remained reachable, close and secure amid all losses: language. Yes, language. In spite of everything, it remained secure against loss. But it had to go through its own lack of answers, through terrifying silence, through the thousand darknesses of murderous speech. It went through. It gave me no words for what was happening, but went through it. Went through and could resurface, 'enriched' by it all.

Celan also said: "There is nothing in the world for which a poet will give up writing, not even when he is a Jew and the language of his poems is German."

His masterpiece, "Todesfuge", may have drawn some key motifs from the poem "ER" by his fellow Romanian poet Immanuel Weissglas, another Czernovitz poet. The characters of Margarete and Sulamith, with their respectively golden and ashen hair, can be interpreted as a reflection of Celan's Jewish-German culture, while the blue-eyed "Master from Germany" embodies German Nazism.

== Awards ==
- Bremen Literature Prize 1958
- Georg Büchner Prize 1960

== Significance ==
Philosophers including Maurice Blanchot, Jacques Derrida and Hans-Georg Gadamer devoted at least one of their books to the poetics of Celan's work. He has been regarded, alongside Goethe, Hölderlin and Rilke, as one of the most significant German poets, and a radical innovator of German-language literature. Despite the difficulty of his work, his poetry is thoroughly researched, with the total number of scholarly papers numbering in the thousands.

== In film ==
The Dreamed Ones (Die Geträumten; 2016), is a feature film based on the almost 20-year correspondence between Celan and poet Ingeborg Bachmann. It was directed by Ruth Beckermann, and won several awards.

Celan is featured as an inspiration for the work of Anselm Kiefer, who reads Celan's poem Todesfuge, in Wim Wenders' 2023 3D movie Anselm.

== Bibliography ==
=== In German ===
- Der Sand aus den Urnen (The Sand from the Urns, 1948)
- Mohn und Gedächtnis (Poppy and Destiny, 1952)
- Von Schwelle zu Schwelle (From Threshold to Threshold, 1955)
- Sprachgitter (Speechwicket / Speech Grille, 1959)
- Die Niemandsrose (The No-One's-Rose, 1963)
- Atemwende (Breathturn, 1967)
- Fadensonnen (Threadsuns / Twinesuns / Fathomsuns, 1968)
- Lichtzwang (Lightduress / Light-Compulsion, 1970)
- Schneepart (Snow Part [posthumous], 1971)
- Zeitgehöft (Timestead / Homestead of Time [posthumous], 1976)

=== Translations ===
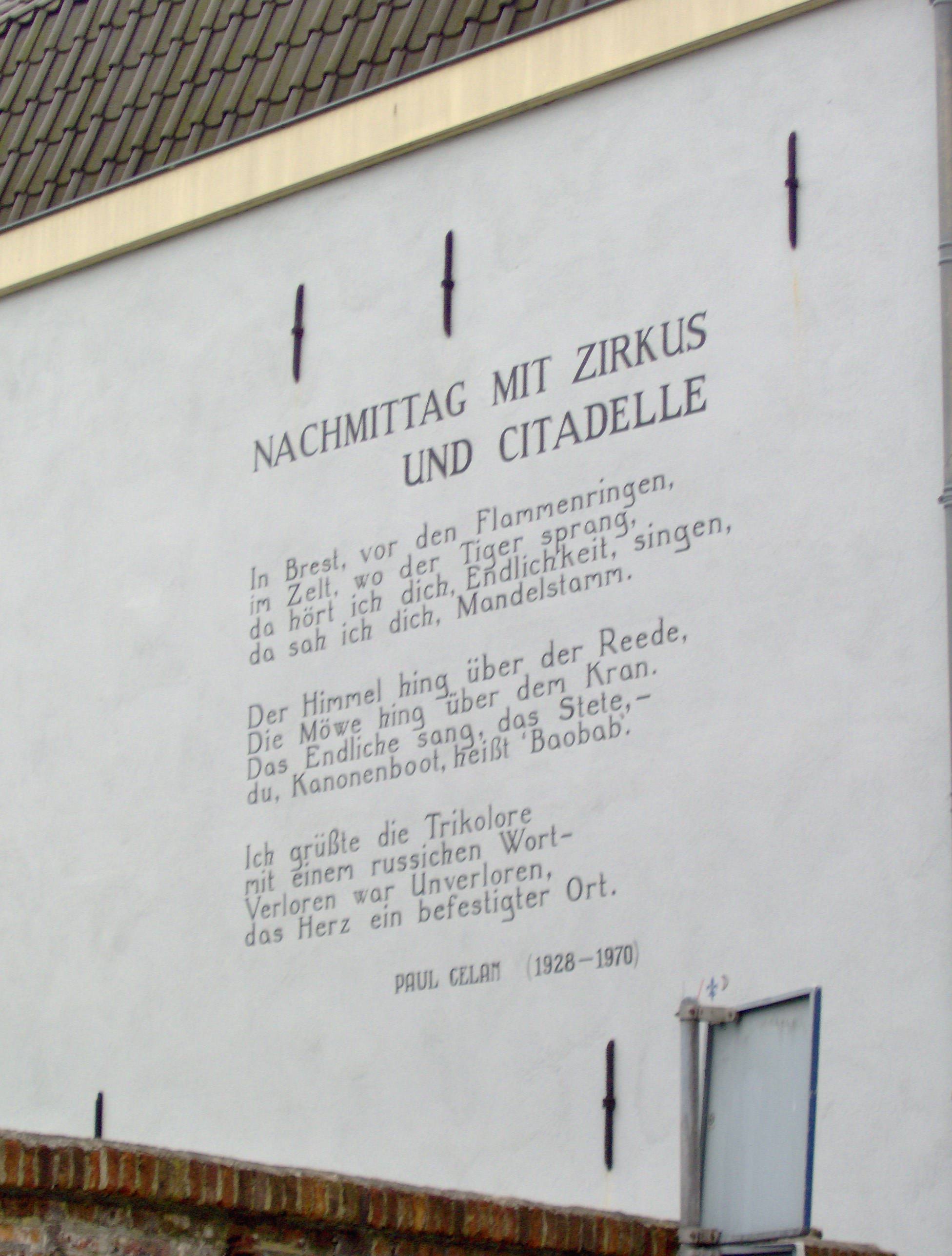
Poem ("Nachmittag mit Zirkus und Zitadelle") by Paul Celan on a wall in Leiden

Celan's poetry has been translated into English, with many of the volumes being bilingual. The most comprehensive collections are from John Felstiner, Pierre Joris, and Michael Hamburger, who revised his translations of Celan over a period of two decades. Susan H. Gillespie and Ian Fairley have released English translations.

Joris has also translated Celan's German poems into French:

- "Speech-Grille" and Selected Poems, translated by Joachim Neugroschel (1971)
- Nineteen Poems by Paul Celan, translated by Michael Hamburger (1972)
- Paul Celan, 65 Poems, translated by Brian Lynch and Peter Jankowsky (1985)
- Last Poems, translated by Katharine Washburn and Margret Guillemin (1986)
- Collected Prose, edited by Rosmarie Waldrop (1986) ISBN 978-0-935296-92-1
- Atemwende/Breathturn, translated by Pierre Joris (1995)
- Paul Celan, Nelly Sachs: Correspondence, translated by Christopher Clark, edited with an introduction by John Felstiner (1998)
- Glottal Stop: 101 Poems, translated by Nikolai B. Popov and Heather McHugh (2000) (winner of the 2001 International Griffin Poetry Prize)
- Selected Poems and Prose of Paul Celan, edited and translated by John Felstiner (2000) (winner of the PEN, MLA, and American Translators Association prizes)
- Poems of Paul Celan: A Bilingual German/English Edition, Revised Edition, translated by Michael Hamburger (2001)
- Fathomsuns/Fadensonnen and Benighted/Eingedunkelt, translated by Ian Fairley (2001)
- Romanian Poems, translated by Julian Semilian and Sanda Agalidi (2003)
- Paul Celan: Selections, edited and with an introduction by Pierre Joris (2005)
- Lichtzwang/Lightduress, translated and with an introduction by Pierre Joris, a bilingual edition (Green Integer, 2005)
- Snow Part, translated by Ian Fairley (2007)
- From Threshold to Threshold, translated by David Young (2010)
- Paul Celan, Ingeborg Bachmann: Correspondence, translated by Wieland Hoban (2010)
- The Correspondence of Paul Celan and Ilana Shmueli, translated by Susan H. Gillespie with a preface by John Felstiner (2011)
- The Meridian: Final Version – Drafts – Materials, edited by Bernhard Böschenstein and Heino Schmull, translated by Pierre Joris (2011)
- Corona: Selected Poems of Paul Celan, translated by Susan H. Gillespie (Station Hill of Barrytown, 2013)
- Breathturn into Timestead: The Collected Later Poetry: A Bilingual Edition, translated by Pierre Joris (2015)
- Something is still present and isn't, of what's gone. A bilingual anthology of avant-garde and avant-garde inspired Rumanian poetry, (translated by Victor Pambuccian), Aracne editrice, Rome, 2018.
- Microliths They Are, Little Stones: Posthumous Prose, translated by Pierre Joris (2020)
- Memory Rose Into Threshold Speech: The Collected Earlier Poetry, A Bilingual Edition, translated by Pierre Joris (2020)

=== In Romanian ===
- Paul Celan și "meridianul" său. Repere vechi și noi pe un atlas central-European, Andrei Corbea Hoișie

=== Bilingual ===
- Paul Celan. Biographie et interpretation/Biographie und Interpretation, editor Andrei Corbea Hoișie
- Schneepart / Snøpart. Translated 2012 to Norwegian by Anders Bærheim and Cornelia Simon

=== Writers translated by Celan ===
- Guillaume Apollinaire
- Tudor Arghezi
- Antonin Artaud
- Charles Baudelaire
- Alexander Blok
- André Breton
- Jean Cayrol
- Aimé Césaire
- René Char
- Emil Cioran
- Jean Daive
- Robert Desnos
- Emily Dickinson
- John Donne
- André du Bouchet
- Jacques Dupin
- Paul Éluard
- Robert Frost
- Clement Greenberg
- A. E. Housman
- Velimir Khlebnikov
- Maurice Maeterlinck
- Stéphane Mallarmé
- Osip Mandelstam
- Andrew Marvell
- Henri Michaux
- Marianne Moore
- Gellu Naum
- Gérard de Nerval
- Henri Pastoureau
- Benjamin Péret
- Fernando Pessoa
- Pablo Picasso
- Arthur Rimbaud
- David Rokeah
- William Shakespeare
- Georges Simenon
- Jules Supervielle
- Virgil Teodorescu
- Giuseppe Ungaretti
- Paul Valéry
- Sergei Yesenin
- Yevgeny Yevtushenko

==== About translations ====
About translating David Rokeah from Hebrew, Celan wrote: "David Rokeah was here for two days, I have translated two poems for him, mediocre stuff, and given him comments on other German translation, suggested improvements ... I was glad, probably in the wrong place, to be able to decipher and translate a Hebrew text."

=== Biographies ===
- Paul Celan: A Biography of His Youth Israel Chalfen, intro. John Felstiner, trans. Maximilian Bleyleben (New York: Persea Books, 1991)
- Paul Celan: Poet, Survivor, Jew, John Felstiner (Yale University Press, 1995)

=== Selected criticism ===
- Word Traces, Aris Fioretos (ed.), includes contributions by Jacques Derrida, Werner Hamacher, and Philippe Lacoue-Labarthe (1994)
- Gadamer on Celan: 'Who Am I and Who Are You?' and Other Essays, Hans-Georg Gadamer (trans.) and Richard Heinemann and Bruce Krajewski (eds.) (1997)
- Poetry as Experience Philippe Lacoue-Labarthe, Andrea Tarnowski (trans.) (1999)
- Economy of the Unlost: Reading Simonides of Keos with Paul Celan, Carson, Anne. Princeton: Princeton University Press (1999)
- Zur Poetik Paul Celans: Gedicht und Mensch - die Arbeit am Sinn, Marko Pajević. Universitätsverlag C. Winter, Heidelberg (2000).
- Poésie contre poésie. Celan et la littérature, Jean Bollack. PUF (2001)
- Celan Studies Péter Szondi; Susan Bernofsky and Harvey Mendelsohn (trans.) (2003)
- L'écrit : une poétique dans l'oeuvre de Celan, Jean Bollack. PUF (2003)
- Paul Celan et Martin Heidegger: le sens d'un dialogue, Hadrien France-Lanord (2004)
- Words from Abroad: Trauma and Displacement in Postwar German Jewish Writers, Katja Garloff (2005)
- Sovereignties in Question: the Poetics of Paul Celan, Jacques Derrida (trans.), Thomas Dutoit and Outi Pasanen (eds.), a collection of mostly late works, including "Rams," which is also a memorial essay on Gadamer and his Who Am I and Who Are You?, and a new translation of Schibboleth (2005)
- Paul Celan and Martin Heidegger: An Unresolved Conversation, 1951–1970, James K. Lyon (2006)
- Anselm Kiefer /Paul Celan. Myth, Mourning and Memory, Andréa Lauterwein. With 157 illustrations, 140 in colour. Thames & Hudson, London. ISBN 978-0-500-23836-3 (2007)
- Sites of the Uncanny: Paul Celan, Specularity and the Visual Arts, Eric Kligerman. Berlin and New York (Interdisciplinary German Cultural Studies, 3) (2007)
- Vor Morgen. Bachmann und Celan. Die Minne im Angesicht der Morde. Arnau Pons in Kultur & Genspenster. Heft Nr. 10. (2010)
- Das Gesicht des Gerechten. Paul Celan besucht Friedrich Dürrenmatt, Werner Wögerbauer in Kultur & Genspenster. Heft Nr. 10. ISBN 978-3-938801-73-4 (2010)
- Poetry as Individuality: The Discourse of Observation in Paul Celan, Derek Hillard. Bucknell University Press. (2010)
- Vor Morgen. Bachmann und Celan. Die Minne im Angesicht der Morde, Arnau Pons in Kultur & Genspenster. Heft Nr. 10. (2010)
- Still Songs: Music In and Around the Poetry of Paul Celan, Axel Englund. Farnham: Ashgate. (2012) ISBN 9781409422624
- Shakespeare and Celan: A very brief comparative Study, Pinaki Roy in Yearly Shakespeare (ISSN 0976-9536) (xviii): 118–24. (2020)

== Audio-visual ==
=== Recordings ===
- Ich hörte sagen, readings of his original compositions
- Gedichte, readings of his translations of Osip Mandelstam and Sergei Yesenin
- Six Celan Songs, texts of his poems "Chanson einer Dame im Schatten", "Es war Erde in ihnen", "Psalm", "Corona", "Nächtlich geschürzt", "Blume", sung by Ute Lemper, set to music by Michael Nyman
- Tenebrae (Nah sind wir, Herr) from Drei Gedichte von Paul Celan (1998) of Marcus Ludwig, sung by the ensemble amarcord
- "Einmal" (from Atemwende), "Zähle die Mandeln" (from Mohn und Gedächtnis), "Psalm" (from Die Niemandsrose), set to music by Giya Kancheli as parts II–IV of Exil, sung by Maacha Deubner, ECM (1995)
- Pulse Shadows by Harrison Birtwistle; nine settings of poems by Celan, interleaved with nine pieces for string quartet (one of which is an instrumental setting of "Todesfuge").

== Reviews ==
- Dove, Richard (1981), Mindus Inversus, review of Selected Poems translated by Michael Humburger. in Murray, Glen (ed.), Cencrastus No. 7, Winter 1981–82, p. 48, ISSN 0264-0856

== See also ==
- List of Austrian writers
