= Léopold Szondi =

Hungarian psychiatrist

- Born: 11 March 1893; Nitra, Austria-Hungary (now Slovakia)
- Died: 24 January 1986 (aged 92); Küsnacht, Switzerland
- Occupation: Psychiatrist
- Known for: Szondi test
- Children: 2, including Péter Szondi

Léopold Szondi (Hungarian: Szondi Lipót [ˈsondi ˈlipoːt]; March 11, 1893 – January 24, 1986) was a Hungarian psychiatrist and psychoanalyst, psychopathologist and Professor of psychology. Founder of the concept of fate analysis. He is known for the now-discredited psychological tool that bears his name, the Szondi test.

== Biography ==
Szondi was born in city of Nyitra (in present-day Slovakia) and raised in a German and Slovak-speaking Jewish family. The original name of the family was Sonnenschein. He was born as the twelfth child in his father's second marriage. The family moved to Budapest in 1898. His mother, who died very soon, was remembered by the family as an illiterate, unwholesome woman who had to be supervised by the elder siblings during her depressive periods. The father himself had a huge impact on Szondi, influencing his fate-analytical works to a great extent. These are his own words about his father: "My father was a Jewish shoemaker, who spent most of his time studying the Jewish Holy Scriptures, supposedly Talmudic and Hasidic ones. I was five when the family moved to Budapest, and my elder brothers and sisters had to provide for the family, while my father contributed as an assistant rabbi during the service on big Jewish feasts. In such an environment I was raised to be religious. I was eighteen when he died, right before graduation. I used to say the prayer called Kaddish every morning and evening due to Jewish customs in front of the communion for a whole year. This was the time when my ego had internalized my father. These deep patterns were the ones leading me in my academic works later on, even when I had already given up the dogmatic customs of the Jewish religion. I still remained a Jew, a devoted one. Hence the role of belief function supposedly has a strong connection with me being brought up in a religious manner."

In June 1944, he was deported with his family to Bergen-Belsen concentration camp on the Kastner train. After 1700 American intellectuals paid a large ransom to Adolf Eichmann, Szondi, his family, and other prominent intellectuals were released to Switzerland in December 1944, where Szondi continued to live after the war. In 1961, the test developed by Szondi was used by Israeli judges to test the same Adolf Eichmann during his 1961 trial.

By then, Szondi was widely acknowledged as an internationally renowned psychoanalyst, who had sought a third way between Sigmund Freud and Carl Gustav Jung. While Freud has focused on the individual unconscious, and Jung on the collective unconscious, Szondi privileged what he called "the family unconscious." The heart of his theory was the claim that the genes of our ancestors are present in our unconscious and influence our choices. Connecting with our collective unconscious through his method called "Fate Analysis," Szondi claimed, would allow us to achieve a higher degree of liberty, as we become free to follow or reject the "fatal" impulses coming from the presence of the ancestors in our psychic field.

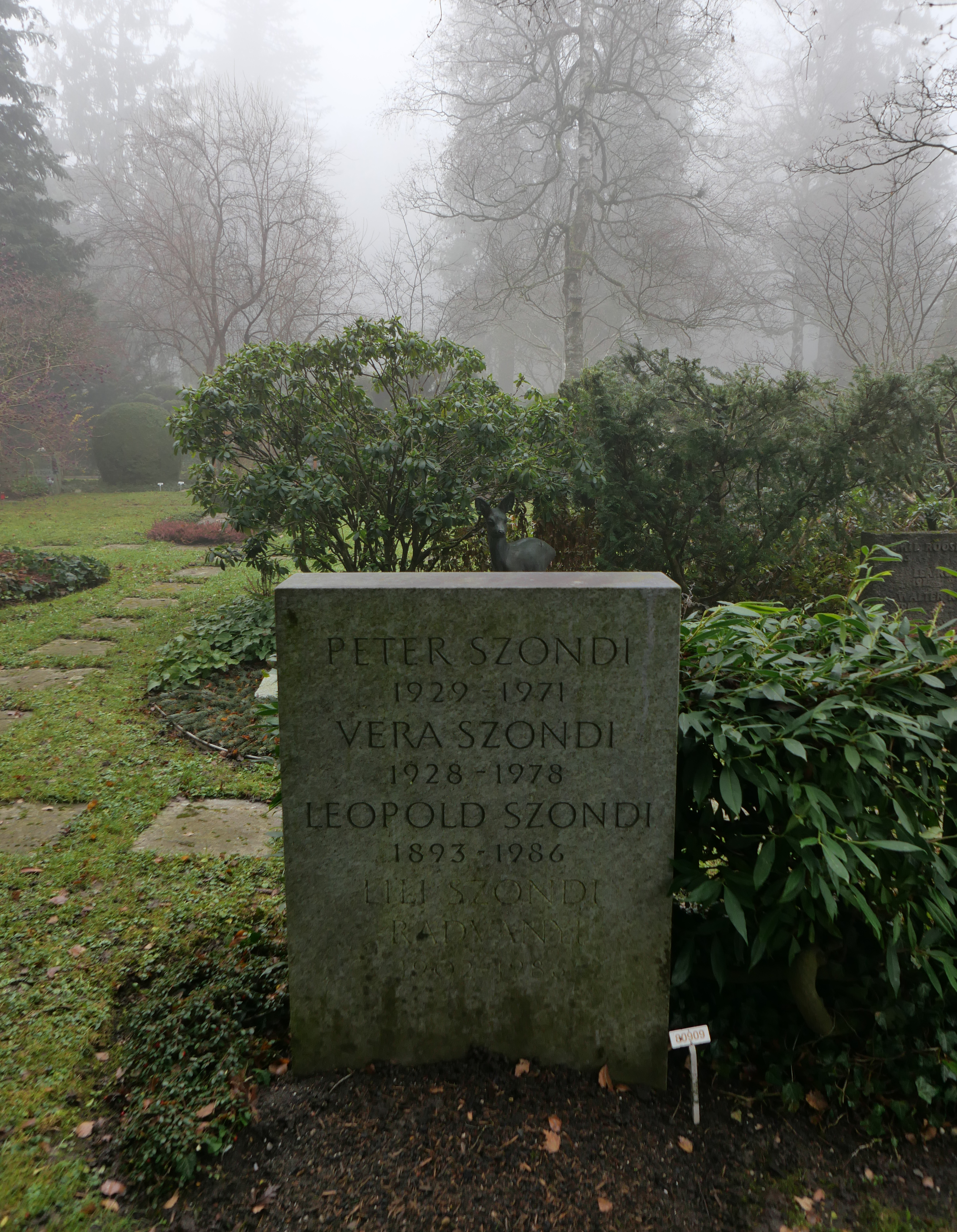
The family grave

Szondi never achieved the fame of Freud and Jung, but by the time of his death in 1986 he had gathered a loyal following. In 1969, the Szondi Institute had been established in Zurich to preserve his writings, papers, and legacy.

Szondi found his final resting place in the Fluntern Cemetery in Zurich. His wife Ilona “Lili” Livia, née Radványi (1902-1986), who died shortly after him, their son Peter (1929-1971), who was a literary scholar and died by suicide, and their daughter Vera (1928-1978), who was a medical doctor, are buried in the same grave.

== See also ==
- Péter Szondi (his son)

== Notes ==
-
