= Margot Robbie filmography =

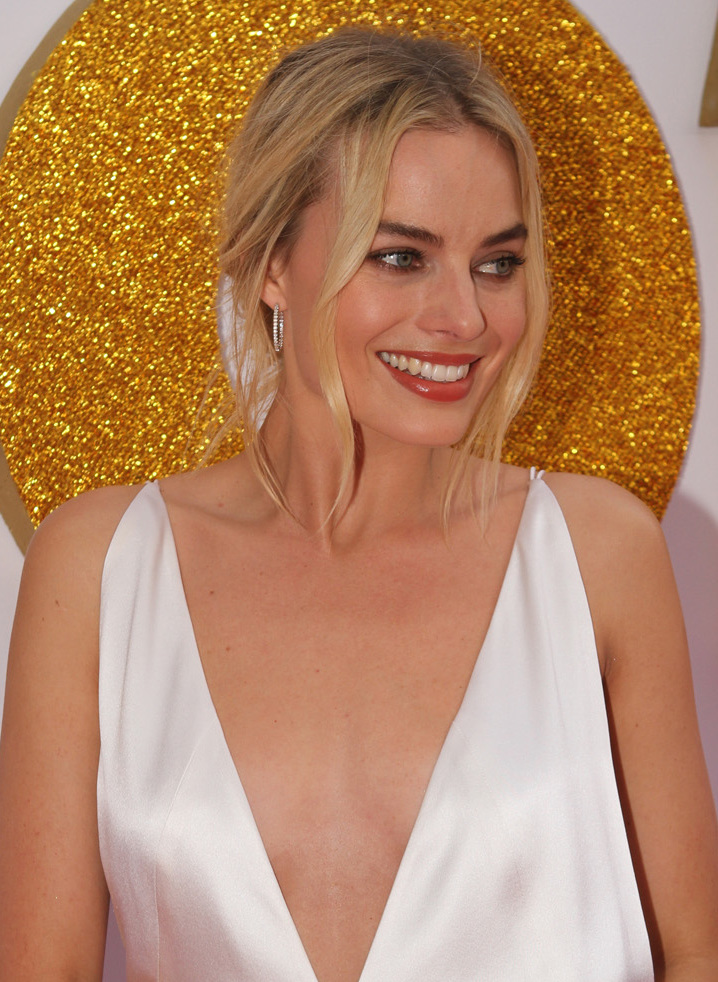
Robbie at the Australian premiere of I, Tonya in 2018

Margot Robbie (born 2 July 1990) is an Australian actress and producer. She made her television debut featuring in City Homicide (2008) and her film debut in the 2008 film Vigilante. Robbie then landed a role on the long-running Australian soap opera Neighbours (2008–2011, 2022). From 2011 until its cancellation in 2012, she portrayed a stewardess on the television series Pan Am. Her breakout role was in the Martin Scorsese-directed The Wolf of Wall Street (2013) opposite Leonardo DiCaprio. In 2015, she acted alongside Will Smith in the comedy-drama Focus. In the following year, Robbie played Harley Quinn in the DC Extended Universe film Suicide Squad, later reprising the role in Birds of Prey (2020) and The Suicide Squad (2021). Also in 2016, she played Jane Porter in The Legend of Tarzan. That year she also hosted an episode of Saturday Night Live.

Robbie's portrayal of Tonya Harding in the biopic I, Tonya (2017) garnered her a nomination for the Academy Award for Best Actress. The following year, she was Elizabeth I in Mary Queen of Scots, which garnered her a SAG Award nomination. That same year, Robbie voiced Flopsy Rabbit in Peter Rabbit. She received a second Academy Award nomination, this time for Best Supporting Actress, for her performance as a Fox News employee in Bombshell (2019). Her portrayal of Sharon Tate in the Quentin Tarantino-directed Once Upon a Time in Hollywood (2019) garnered her a nomination for the BAFTA Award for Best Actress in a Supporting Role. Robbie later reprised the role of Quinn in Birds of Prey in 2020 and in The Suicide Squad the following year. In 2022, Robbie starred in the period films Amsterdam and Babylon. In 2023, she played the title role in the Greta Gerwig-directed Barbie.

Robbie has also produced several projects, including the Hulu television series Dollface (2019–2022), the film Promising Young Woman (2020), and the Netflix miniseries Maid (2021).

== Film ==
Year	Title	Role	Notes	Ref.
2008	Vigilante	Cassandra		
2009	I.C.U.	Tristen Waters		
2013	About Time	Charlotte		
2013	The Wolf of Wall Street	Naomi Lapaglia		
2015	Z for Zachariah	Ann Burden		
2015	Focus	Jess Barrett		
2015	Suite Française	Celine Joseph		
2015	The Big Short	Herself	Cameo appearance	
2016	Whiskey Tango Foxtrot	Tanya Vanderpoel		
2016	The Legend of Tarzan	Jane Clayton		
2016	Australian Psycho	Herself	Short film	
2016	Suicide Squad	Harley Quinn		
2017	I, Tonya	Tonya Harding	Also producer	
2017	Goodbye Christopher Robin	Daphne Milne		
2018	Peter Rabbit	Flopsy / The Narrator	Voice role	
2018	Flopsy Turvy	Flopsy	Voice role; short film	
2018	Terminal	Annie / Bonnie	Also producer	
2018	Slaughterhouse Rulez	Audrey	Cameo	
2018	Mary Queen of Scots	Elizabeth I		
2019	Dreamland	Allison Wells	Also producer	
2019	Once Upon a Time in Hollywood	Sharon Tate		
2019	Bombshell	Kayla Pospisil		
2020	Birds of Prey	Harley Quinn	Also producer	
2020	Promising Young Woman	—N/a	Producer only	
2021	The Humming of the Beast	—N/a	Short film; executive producer only	
2021	Peter Rabbit 2: The Runaway	Flopsy / The Narrator	Voice role	
2021	The Suicide Squad	Harley Quinn		
2022	Amsterdam	Valerie Voze		
2022	Babylon	Nellie LaRoy		
2023	Asteroid City	Actress / Wife		
2023	Barbie	Barbie	Also producer	
2023	Saltburn	—N/a	Producer only	
2024	My Old Ass	—N/a	Producer only	
2025	Borderline	—N/a	Executive producer only	
2025	A Big Bold Beautiful Journey	Sarah		
2026	Wuthering Heights	Catherine Earnshaw	Also producer	
2027	Untitled Ocean's Eleven prequel †	TBA	Also producer, filming	

Key
†	Denotes films that have not yet been released

== Television ==
Year	Title	Role	Notes	Ref.
2008–2011, 2022	Neighbours	Donna Freedman	Series regular; 355 episodes	
2008	City Homicide	Caitlin Brentford	1 episode	
2008	Review with Myles Barlow	Kelly	1 episode	
2009	The Elephant Princess	Juliet	2 episodes	
2009	Talkin' 'Bout Your Generation	Herself	Series 1: Episode 11	
2011–2012	Pan Am	Laura Cameron	Main cast	
2015	Top Gear	Herself	Series 22: Episode 4	
2015	Neighbours 30th: The Stars Reunite	Herself	Documentary	
2016	Saturday Night Live	Host	Episode: "Margot Robbie / The Weeknd"	
2019–2022	Dollface	Imelda	Episode: "Mama Bear"; also executive producer	
2021	Maid	—N/a	Miniseries; executive producer only	
2022	Mike	—N/a	Miniseries; executive producer only	
2025	Sirens	—N/a	Miniseries; executive producer only	
2026	Sterling Point	—N/a	Producer only	

== See also ==
- List of awards and nominations received by Margot Robbie
