= Stephanie Land =

American writer (born 1978)

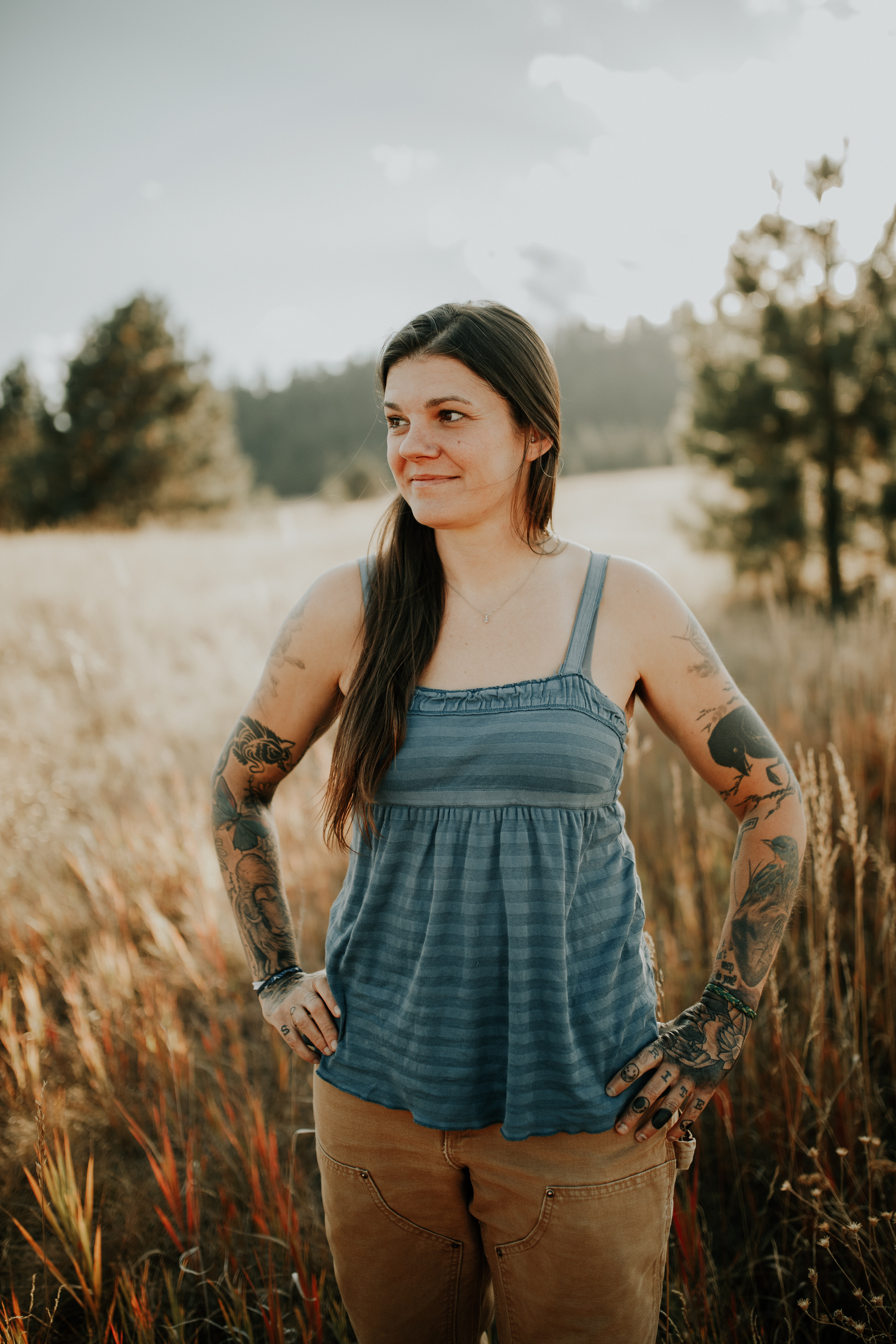
- Land in 2018
- Born: September 1978 (age 48)
- Education: University of Montana (BA)
- Occupations: Author, public speaker
- Years active: 2014–present
- Organization: Center for Community Change
- Notable work: Maid
- Style: Memoir
- Children: 2
- Website: Official website

Stephanie Land (born September 1978) is an American author and public speaker. She is best known for writing Maid: Hard Work, Low Pay, and a Mother's Will to Survive (2019), which was adapted to television miniseries Maid (2021) for Netflix. Her second memoir, Class: A Memoir of Motherhood, Hunger, and Higher Education (2023) explores the challenges of single parenting and poverty while attending college. Land has also written several articles about maid service work, domestic abuse and poverty in the United States.

== Early life and education ==
Land grew up between Washington and Anchorage, Alaska, in a middle class household. A car accident at age 16 led to her being diagnosed with post-traumatic stress disorder, a condition which was later exacerbated by her financial struggles.

In her late twenties, she lived in Port Townsend, Washington, where she had her first child and became a single mother who worked maid service jobs to support her family. Although she did not grow up in poverty, she spent the next several years living below the poverty line and relied on several welfare programs to cover necessary expenses; this later inspired her writing on issues of poverty and public policy. In January 2008, Land broke up with her partner and moved to a homeless shelter with her then nine-month-old daughter. Land and her eldest daughter occasionally lived in homeless shelters, transitional housing, and a camper in a driveway, before securing an apartment in low-income housing. The first line of her debut book Maid: Hard Work, Low Pay, and a Mother's Will to Survive (2019) reads: "My daughter learned to walk in a homeless shelter."

After six years of cleaning in Washington and Montana, she was eventually able to use student loans and Pell grants to move to earn a Bachelor of Arts in English and creative writing from the University of Montana in May 2014. During her studies, she published her first public writing in the form of blog posts and local publications followed by Internet-based publications such as HuffPost and Vox. Upon graduating from the University of Montana, Land ended her dependence on food stamps, started working as a freelance writer, and became a writing fellow with the Center for Community Change. Land would later detail these experiences in the 2023 memoir Class: A Memoir of Motherhood, Hunger, and Higher Education.

== Notable works ==
External videos
- After Words with Stephanie Land, from C-Span: Stephanie Land discussed her path from working as a maid to earning a journalism degree and later writing about the working poor. She was interviewed by Rachel Schneider, co-author of The Financial Diaries.

=== Maid: Hard Work, Low Pay, and a Mother's Will to Survive (2019) ===
Land's first book Maid: Hard Work, Low Pay, and a Mother's Will to Survive was published by Hachette Books on January 22, 2019. The book—an elaboration of an article Land wrote for Vox in 2015—debuted at number three on The New York Times Best Seller list. Barack Obama placed the book on his "Summer Reading List" of 2019 and actress Reese Witherspoon said she "loved this story about one woman surviving impossible circumstances."

In USA Today, Sharon Peters praised the book's honesty, writing that it's filled "with much candid detail about the frustrations with the limitations of programs she relied on. It is a picture of the soul-robbing grind through poverty that millions live with every day." Emily Cooke of The New York Times summed up her review by focusing on the clarity of Land's suffering in the work: "Land’s memoir is not particularly artful. The narration advances with some circularity; the language is often stale. But her book has the needed quality of reversing the direction of the gaze.... It’s worth listening to." In The Washington Post, Jenny Rogers writes, "Maid isn’t about how hard work can save you but about how false that idea is. It’s one woman’s story of inching out of the dirt and how the middle class turns a blind eye to the poverty lurking just a few rungs below—and it’s one worth reading." Kirkus Reviews concludes that Maid is "[a]n important memoir that should be required reading for anyone who has never struggled with poverty." On the other hand, Nancy Rommelmann from Newsday asserted, "Land may be living on one side of the divide while trying to get to the other — she badly wants to become a writer and writes during the margins of time she has available — but her method of calling close attention to personal affronts can grow wearying." The book was the January 2022 selection of the L.A. Times Book Club.

Maid: Hard Work, Low Pay and a Mother's Will to Survive was adapted to a 10-episode limited series Maid (2021) for the streaming service Netflix and released on October 1, 2021. The series starred Margaret Qualley, Andie MacDowell and Nick Robinson. On October 24, 2021, Forbes reported that Maid has remained in the most viewed "Top 5 Shows" since its release in numerous countries. According to Netflix, the show will likely reach 67 million households in its first four weeks, surpassing the record set by The Queen’s Gambit, which was watched by 62 million subscribers. National Domestic Violence Hotline and other resources were mentioned after each episode of Maid. The National Domestic Violence Hotline received more calls in the month after Maid premiere than any other month in its entire 25-year history. In 2023, Maid again entered Netflix's Top Ten shows, in part because of viral TikTok videos.

=== Class: A Memoir of Motherhood, Hunger, and Higher Education (2023) ===
Land's second book was announced in 2020 for release by One Signal Publishers, an imprint of Simon & Schuster. The book was originally conceived as a combination of Land's experiences and a deeply reported investigation into the high costs of higher education, but, as Land told The Washington Post in 2023, "I’m not a journalist — I don’t even know the code of ethics for all of that — so it was this really intimidating thing.... My editor told me: 'The Netflix series [Maid] is so incredible. Everybody’s just loving it. I know you’ve been struggling with this book. And you can write whatever you want.'"

Class: A Memoir of Motherhood, Hunger, and Higher Education, was published on November 7, 2023. The book details Land's personal experiences with higher education and poverty in the United States, recounting her experiences as an undergraduate English major at the University of Montana. Land spoke of her inspiration to write Class in a Publishers Weekly interview in 2023, saying: "I mostly wanted to write about the most important thing I’ve ever done: getting myself through college. I decided to focus on my final year, when I got pregnant with my second child. It was what I called my Britney Spears year—if I could get through that, then I could get through anything. I really needed this story when I was buried in it."

Good Morning America picked Class as their book club choice for November 2023. However, Class was released with less fanfare than Maid, garnering few pre-publication reviews. Reviewers praised Land's candor in sharing her experiences as a single parent and college student. A prepublication review from Publishers Weekly calls the book a "frank and captivating memoir." Nelson Lichtenstein, reviewing Class for The New York Times, writes that "Land bares her soul and psyche, offering readers a look at her inner life with excruciating honesty." Lorraine Barry, writing for the Los Angeles Times, criticizes Land's sophomore memoir, noting that "[a] more complete tale would surely involve anger — which is perhaps a more honest word than 'resilience' in explaining the drive to succeed in the face of horrendous barriers. In “Class,” however, that anger forecloses the greatest gift of the memoir genre, which is self-reflection." Kirkus Reviews also notes the anger in the book while still recommending it: "Though she is a successful writer, she harbors a surprising amount of rancor about her rejection from Montana’s graduate creative writing program. Still, the overall quality of the writing and the importance of the story make for a powerful read."

=== The Shelter Within: A True Story (2025) ===
Her e-book for Amazon Original Stories, The Shelter Within: A True Story, was released on June 24, 2025. It is a 43-page essay abot motherhood and poverty.

== Maid and scholarship ==
Feminist, Marxist, and cultural studies scholars have used Maid as evidence for arguments about economic and reproductive justice. In a survey of women’s memoirs written in the wake of the 2016 MeToo movement, Leigh Gilmore notes that Maid “contributes to a missing archive of knowledge. Land uses life narrative to cast a steady gaze—empathetic, self-aware, feminist—on the invisibility of white working poor mothers and the stigma they face as they struggle to secure a stable life for their children.”

Roseanne Kennedy explores Maid and the This American Life episode “Three Miles” through the lens of “domestic humanitarianism,” a term she has coined to describe the “cultural turn toward humanitarian rhetorics, ad hoc gestures, and individual solutions to supplement the nation’s failure to provide adequately for its citizens and residents in the face of widening economic disparity.” Kennedy argues that works like Maid may distract readers from larger, systemic problems of inequity, inadvertently preventing necessary collective work for economic justice.

Drawing on Kennedy’s work, Katrina Powell considers the ways that Land’s memoir can be viewed as “testimony,” noting that “it is critical to understand the form, function, reception, and contexts of particular testimonies.” Powell agrees with Kennedy’s argument that tropes like “needy victim” and “heroic rescuer” can distract from a larger discussion of societal failure to provide sustainable livelihoods for all citizens.

Discussing the release of the Netflix series based on Land's memoir in her review of working class narratives, Kathy Newman writes that “Maid is an outlier in television on a number of counts. It is centered on women—including women of color. It is written and produced by a woman head writer, Molly Smith Metzler, and based on source material written by a woman, Stephanie Land,” who, Newman notes, chose a more fictionalized account of her story so that she could integrate more women of color into the narrative.

In the 2019 co-written analysis “Short Takes: Stephanie Land’s Maid,” some feminist scholars note that Maid centers a white woman in a situation that is far more common for women of color. Land’s response acknowledges this concern: “It [Maid] is my very personal story of survival. And a privileged one at that. I have often wondered…if people are grasping onto my story because I look like them. I could be their sister, or neighbor. Because I’m plain-faced, and white.”

== Personal life ==
Stephanie Land owns a home in Missoula, Montana.

Land has spoken openly about the stigma of receiving government assistance and the assumptions people had of her when she was relying on food stamps. In a 2021 interview with The Washington Post, Land said:

It’s really hard to absolutely know how hated you are for needing assistance. There were a lot of memes going around at the time about how people should be drug-tested for welfare, and a lot of my friends would post on Facebook and social media some type of hatred for people on food stamps. And I felt it. I felt like I was a leech on society, honestly. My goal was to one day be off of government assistance, be a contributing member of society. I really felt like the only time I had any value as a human being was when I was actively working.

== Filmography ==
Stephanie Land television work
| Year | Title | Role | Notes |
|---|---|---|---|
| 2019 | After Words | Herself | Guest; Episode dated January 22, 2019 |
| 2019 | Today | Herself | Guest; Episode dated 22 January 2019 |
| 2019 | Good Morning Washington | Herself | Guest; Episode dated January 28, 2019 |
| 2019 | Matter of Fact with Soledad O'Brien | Herself | Guest; Episode dated February 2, 2019 |
| 2019 | CNN Newsroom | Herself | Guest; Episode dated February 17, 2019 |
| 2021 | Maid | Executive producer and writer | Inspired by Land's book Maid (2019) |

Podcasts with Stephanie Land
| Year | Title | Role | Notes |
|---|---|---|---|
| 2019 | All of It with Alison Stewart | Guest | Episode dated January 23, 2019 |
| 2019 | New York Times Podcast | Guest | Episode dated February 8, 2019 |
| 2019 | Mountain Money | Guest | Episode dated February 25, 2019 |
| 2019 | Off-Kilter Podcast | Guest | Episode dated April 4, 2019 |
| 2022 | Twitterverse | Guest | Episode Six: Stephanie Land |

== Awards and nominations ==
Awards and nominations received by Stephanie Land
| Year | Ceremony | Award | Work | Result |
|---|---|---|---|---|
| 2022 | USC Scripter Awards | USC Scripter Award for Maid's episode "Dollar Store" (shared with Molly Smith Metzler) | Maid: Hard Work, Low Pay and a Mother's Will to Survive | Nominated |

== Bibliography ==
=== Books ===
- Land, Stephanie. Maid: Hard Work, Low Pay and a Mother's Will to Survive (2019). Hachette Books. ISBN 0316505110
- Land, Stephanie. Class: A Memoir of Motherhood, Hunger, and Higher Education (October 3, 2023). Atria/One Signal Publishers.
- Land, Stephanie. The Shelter Within: A True Story. (June 24, 2025). Amazon Original Stories.

=== Authored articles ===
- Land, Stephanie (September 25, 2015). "The Three Car Crashes That Changed My Life" Narratively.
- Land, Stephanie (October 1, 2015). "I lived on $6 a day with a 6-year-old and a baby on the way. It was extreme poverty." The Guardian.
- Land, Stephanie (November 12, 2015). "I Spent 2 Years Cleaning Houses. What I Saw Makes Me Never Want to Be Rich". Vox.
- Land, Stephanie (January 6, 2016). "What do you do when you can’t afford childcare? You get creative.". The Washington Post.
- Land, Stephanie (December 5, 2016). "Trump’s Election Stole My Desire to Look for a Partner". The Washington Post.
- Land, Stephanie (August 27, 2018). "Why I came out as being poor". The Guardian.
- Land, Stephanie (November 15, 2018). "The Day My Husband Strangled Me,". The Guardian.
- Land, Stephanie (September 24, 2019). "I Used to Clean Houses. Then I Hired a Maid." The Atlantic.
- Land, Stephanie (January 21, 2020). "My greatest honor: I wrote a book that touched people living in poverty". The Guardian.
- Land, Stephanie (March 20, 2020). "Pay Your House Cleaner Anyway". The New York Times.
- Land, Stephanie (November 7, 2020). "Joe Biden, Kamala Harris and the Return of Empathy When America Needs It Most". Time.
- Land, Stephanie (September 30, 2021). "I Left Poverty After Writing 'Maid.' But Poverty Never Left Me". Time.
- Land, Stephanie (June 20, 2024). "Stephanie Land: Missoula ordinance against urban camping will only keep people homeless". The Montana Standard.

=== Blog and mailing list ===
- Land, Stephanie. "The Privilege to Feel"

== See also ==
- Nickel and Dimed: On (Not) Getting By in America (2000), an investigative piece on poverty and minimum wage work by Barbara Ehrenreich, also of the Economic Hardship Program and who wrote the introduction to Maid
- Hand to Mouth: Living in Bootstrap America (2014), the debut book by Linda Tirado, also a memoir about poverty in the United States with an introduction written by Barbara Ehrenreich
