= Elemeno Pea =

2011 play by Molly Smith Metzler

Elemeno Pea is a play written in 2011 by Molly Smith Metzler. It premiered on March 8, 2011 as part of the 35th anniversary of the Humana Festival of New American Plays in Louisville, Kentucky. In July 2024, Netflix announced that Metzler had adapted her play into a miniseries called Sirens, starring Julianne Moore, Meghann Fahy and Milly Alcock.

== Plot summary ==
Summer is almost over when blue collar social worker Devon visits her sister Simone at the wealthy estate where she works in Martha's Vineyard. Simone is the personal assistant to the wife of a billionaire. The owners are supposed to be away, when the trophy wife Michaela unexpectedly returns. The story plays out in the luxurious guest house of the estate and includes an eccentric boyfriend and a put upon servant.

== Production history ==
- March 2011: World premiere at Actors Theatre of Louisville in Louisville, KY
- February 2012: West Coast premiere at South Coast Repertory in Costa Mesa, CA
- February 2013: Mixed Blood Theatre Company in Minneapolis, MN
- August 2013: Carolina Actors Studio Theatre in Charlotte, NC
- October 2013: California State University, Northridge in Los Angeles, CA
- January 2014: B Street Theatre in Sacramento, CA
