= Maid (book) =

2019 book by Stephanie Land

- Author: Stephanie Land
- Publication date: January 22, 2019
- ISBN: 0-316-50511-0

Maid: Hard Work, Low Pay, and a Mother's Will to Survive is the first book by Stephanie Land, published by Hachette Books on January 22, 2019. The book—an elaboration of an article Land wrote for Vox in 2015—debuted at number three on The New York Times Best Seller list. The book was adapted to the Netflix television miniseries Maid (2021).

== Reviews ==
In USA Today, Sharon Peters praised the book's honesty, writing that it fills the "with much candid detail about the frustrations with the limitations of programs she relied on. It is a picture of the soul-robbing grind through poverty that millions live with every day." Emily Cooke of The New York Times summed up her review by focusing on the clarity of Land's suffering in the work: "Land’s memoir is not particularly artful. The narration advances with some circularity; the language is often stale. But her book has the needed quality of reversing the direction of the gaze.... It’s worth listening to." In The Washington Post, Jenny Rogers writes, "Maid isn’t about how hard work can save you but about how false that idea is. It’s one woman’s story of inching out of the dirt and how the middle class turns a blind eye to the poverty lurking just a few rungs below—and it’s one worth reading." Kirkus Reviews concludes that Maid is "[a]n important memoir that should be required reading for anyone who has never struggled with poverty." On the other hand, Nancy Rommelmann from Newsday asserted, "Land may be living on one side of the divide while trying to get to the other — she badly wants to become a writer and writes during the margins of time she has available — but her method of calling close attention to personal affronts can grown wearying." The book was the January 2022 selection of the L.A. Times Book Club.

== Scholarship ==
Feminist, Marxist, and cultural studies scholars have used Maid as evidence for arguments about economic and reproductive justice. In a survey of women's memoirs written in the wake of the 2016 MeToo movement, Leigh Gilmore notes that Maid “contributes to a missing archive of knowledge. Land uses life narrative to cast a steady gaze—empathetic, self-aware, feminist—on the invisibility of white working poor mothers and the stigma they face as they struggle to secure a stable life for their children.”

Roseanne Kennedy explores Maid and the This American Life episode “Three Miles” through the lens of “domestic humanitarianism,” a term she has coined to describe the “cultural turn toward humanitarian rhetorics, ad hoc gestures, and individual solutions to supplement the nation’s failure to provide adequately for its citizens and residents in the face of widening economic disparity.” Kennedy argues that works like Maid may distract readers from larger, systemic problems of inequity, inadvertently preventing necessary collective work for economic justice.

Drawing on Kennedy's work, Katrina Powell considers the ways that Land's memoir can be viewed as “testimony,” noting that “it is critical to understand the form, function, reception, and contexts of particular testimonies.” Powell agrees with Kennedy's argument that tropes like “needy victim” and “heroic rescuer” can distract from a larger discussion of societal failure to provide sustainable livelihoods for all citizens.

Discussing the release of the Netflix series based on Land's memoir in her review of working class narratives, Kathy Newman writes that “Maid is an outlier in television on a number of counts. It is centered on women—including women of color. It is written and produced by a woman head writer, Molly Smith Metzler, and based on source material written by a woman, Stephanie Land,” who, Newman notes, chose a more fictionalized account of her story so that she could integrate more women of color into the narrative.

In the 2019 co-written analysis “Short Takes: Stephanie Land’s Maid,” some feminist scholars note that Maid centers a white woman in a situation that is far more common for women of color. Land's response acknowledges this concern: “It [Maid] is my very personal story of survival. And a privileged one at that. I have often wondered…if people are grasping onto my story because I look like them. I could be their sister, or neighbor. Because I’m plain-faced, and white.”
