= Molly Smith Metzler =

American playwright and screenwriter

Molly Smith Metzler is an American playwright and screenwriter known for her play Elemeno Pea (2011) and its TV series adaptation Sirens (2025), as well as the TV series Maid (2021).
