= Sirens (2025 TV series) =

2025 American black comedy television miniseries

- Genre: Black comedy
- Created by: Molly Smith Metzler
- Based on: Elemeno Pea by Molly Smith Metzler
- Starring: Meghann Fahy; Milly Alcock; Glenn Howerton; Bill Camp; Felix Solis; Kevin Bacon; Julianne Moore
- Music by: Michael Abels
- Country of origin: United States
- Original language: English
- No. of episodes: 5

Production
- Executive producers: Molly Smith Metzler; Margot Robbie; Tom Ackerley; Dani Gorin; Nicole Kassell; Colin McKenna
- Producers: Maureen Shepard Orozco; Bruce Dunn; Kristyn Macready
- Cinematography: Gregory Middleton; Zoë White
- Editors: Catherine Haight; Laura Zempel; Isaac Hagy; Jen Bryson
- Running time: 52–63 minutes
- Production companies: LuckyChap Entertainment; On the Verge Entertainment; Quiet Coyote

Original release
- Network: Netflix
- Release: May 22, 2025

Sirens is an American black comedy television miniseries created by Molly Smith Metzler, based on her 2011 play Elemeno Pea. It stars Meghann Fahy, Milly Alcock, Glenn Howerton, Bill Camp, Felix Solis, Kevin Bacon, and Julianne Moore. The story unfolds throughout one explosive weekend at a lavish beach estate. The series is described as an "incisive, sexy, and darkly funny exploration of women, power and class." It premiered on Netflix on May 22, 2025, and received generally positive reviews from critics.

== Premise ==
Devon is concerned about her sister Simone's unusual relationship with her new boss, billionaire Michaela, and decides it is time for an intervention.

== Cast and characters ==
=== Main ===
- Meghann Fahy as Devon DeWitt, Simone's older sister
- Milly Alcock as Simone DeWitt, Devon's younger sister and Michaela's personal assistant
- Glenn Howerton as Ethan Corbin III, the Kells' next-door neighbor and Simone's love interest
- Bill Camp as Bruce DeWitt, Devon and Simone's father who is diagnosed with early-onset dementia
- Felix Solis as Jose, the Cliff House's manager who is in the group text with the help excluding Simone
- Kevin Bacon as Peter Kell, Michaela's billionaire husband who comes from old money and is the CEO of Kell Securities
- Julianne Moore as Michaela "Kiki" Kell, Peter's wife and Simone's boss who is a former lawyer

=== Recurring ===
- Britne Oldford as Missy, the Kells' seasonal housekeeper
- Josh Segarra as Raymond, Devon's married ex-boyfriend and current boss whom she occasionally sleeps with
- Trevor Salter as Jordan/Morgan, Ethan's yacht captain and Devon's love interest
- Lauren Weedman as Patrice, the Kells' personal chef
- Emily Borromeo as Astrid, one of Michaela's friends
- Jenn Lyon as Cloe, another friend of Michaela's
- Erin Neufer as Lisa, another friend of Michaela's

== Production ==
In February 2024, Netflix gave Sirens a limited series order with Molly Smith Metzler attached as writer, showrunner and executive producer. Dani Gorin, Tom Ackerley and Margot Robbie are executive producers under the LuckyChap banner.

In July 2024, Variety reported that Julianne Moore, Meghann Fahy, and Milly Alcock would star. Nicole Kassell was announced to direct the first two episodes and serve as executive producer. That same month, eleven additional cast members were announced, including Kevin Bacon and Glenn Howerton in main roles.

== Episodes ==
| No. | Title | Directed by | Written by | Original release date |
|---|---|---|---|---|
| 1 | "Exile" | Nicole Kassell | Molly Smith Metzler | May 22, 2025 |
After spending the night in jail, Devon sets out to find her younger sister Simone to get her to come home to Buffalo and help care for their father Bruce, who has been diagnosed with early-onset dementia. She tracks Simone to an isolated, ultra-wealthy estate on the island of Port Haven owned by Michaela, a former attorney turned bird sanctuary founder, married to Peter, a billionaire. Devon discovers that Simone, working as Michaela's personal assistant, is deeply embedded in a curated, performative life—she is in a secret relationship with Michaela's eccentric neighbor Ethan and hides her past, including being in foster care and having a sister. Devon becomes increasingly disturbed by the estate's strange cult-like dynamics, strict rules, NDAs, and constant surveillance. Her unease grows as she observes Simone's unsettling closeness with Michaela. Simone refuses to return home, and Michaela offers Devon $10,000 to leave quietly, which Devon angrily declines. Devon confides in a worker named Jose about her struggles with hypersexuality after unsuccessfully trying to seduce him and spends the night with Morgan, the captain of Ethan's yacht.
| 2 | "Talons" | Nicole Kassell | Bekah Brunstetter | May 22, 2025 |
Devon trespasses onto Michaela's estate, determined to convince Simone to leave and return home. Their reunion escalates into an argument, with Simone mentioning Devon's affair with her married boss, Raymond. They are interrupted by Michaela, who orders Jose to escort Devon out. Acting on Michaela's instructions and without Simone's knowledge, Devon is arrested for trespassing. While in jail, she hears rumors that the estate is a cult and that Michaela pushed her husband Peter's ex-wife, Jocelyn, off a cliff. Michaela later agrees to bail Devon out of jail on the conditions that she stay just for the weekend and avoid further disruptions. Determined to rescue Simone, Devon decides to stay and blend in. When she crosses paths with Peter, who just came back from Tokyo, she unsubtly questions him about Jocelyn, but his evasive answers deepen her suspicions. As Michaela prepares for a Vanity Fair photoshoot focused on her bird sanctuary—followed by a lavish bird funeral—she and Peter learn Simone has been sneaking out at night to meet Ethan. Fearing Michaela's reaction, Simone hides and has a panic attack. Alerted by Jose, Devon finds her in hiding and comforts her, having previously discovered that she has stopped taking her Klonopin.
| 3 | "Monster" | Quyen Tran | Colin McKenna | May 22, 2025 |
After waking up, Simone finds herself in yet another argument with Devon, during which Devon reveals that since Simone went to college, she has struggled with alcoholism and has been arrested twice for DUI. Meanwhile, Michaela discovers that the chocolate Peter gave her, supposedly from Tokyo, was not authentic, prompting her to suspect he might be cheating on her. She sends Simone to spy on him, but Peter catches her and admits he had secretly traveled to meet his grandson for the first time. He kept this from Michaela because of her strained relationship with his children. After the confession, he tries to kiss Simone, but she recoils. Throughout the day, Simone tries repeatedly to reach Ethan, to no avail. Devon begins to suspect that Michaela has something to do with Ethan's sudden disappearance. The situation escalates when they go to Ethan's house to search for him—only for him to walk in, having just returned from Buffalo, accompanied by Bruce and Raymond, who has been acting as his caregiver. The room falls silent as Ethan explains his absence—then stuns everyone by proposing to Simone on the spot.
| 4 | "Persephone" | Quyen Tran | Molly Smith Metzler & Colin McKenna | May 22, 2025 |
In the past, Simone arrives to Michaela's estate to work as her asistant. During the interview, they bond after Simone realizes how similar they are, like having won the Goldberg Scholarship to study law. However, she deliberately lies about how her mother died, saying that she was killed in a car accident by drunk driver. In the present, during Ethan's proposal, Michaela arrives at his house looking for Simone. Overwhelmed, Simone does not give an answer and runs out crying. Michaela consoles her, advises against the engagement, and offers her a position as the foundation chair in New York City. Michaela and Peter reconcile after she realizes he has not been unfaithful. That evening, Ethan, Devon, Bruce, Raymond, Morgan, and others have dinner at Michaela's house, where Peter invites them to a humanitarian gala dinner for the bird sanctuary they are organizing the next day. Simone tells Devon she feels no responsibility toward their father, citing years of neglect, her suicide attempt, and blaming him for their mother's suicide, leading to an argument between the sisters. Devon storms out to the beach, followed by her flings Morgan and Raymond, where she ends her toxic affair with Raymond. Later, Simone speaks with Ethan and clearly ends their relationship. Drunk and distraught, Ethan lashes out at Simone and accidentally falls off a cliff. The Vanity Fair photographer arrives at Michaela's home, revealing a secret photo he took of Simone and Peter's kiss, igniting Michaela's fury.
| 5 | "Siren Song" | Lila Neugebauer | Molly Smith Metzler | May 22, 2025 |
Ethan survives the fall from the cliff. Morgan invites Devon on a month-long yacht trip, but she declines in favor of returning to Buffalo with Bruce. Prompted by the kissing photo, Michaela fires Simone, leaving her in a state of shock. Jose escorts Simone, Devon, and Bruce to pick up Raymond from jail, where he had spent the night sobering up. During the pickup, Simone runs off to say goodbye to Peter. Jose drives back to retrieve her. At the gala dinner, Devon accuses Michaela of running a cult and being involved in Jocelyn's death—only to learn Jocelyn is alive, living in seclusion after a failed plastic surgery. Peter tells Michaela he wants a divorce and confesses to feeling uninspired, resenting their childlessness, and fearing Michaela's collection of evidence of his affairs—meant to protect her under the prenuptial agreement. He begins a relationship with Simone and asks Jose to escort Michaela out. Devon confronts Simone about her involvement with Peter. Simone invites her to stay at the estate with Bruce, but she declines. On the ferry home, Devon runs into Michaela and apologizes for her accusations, and Michaela encourages Devon to cash the $10,000 check she gave her. Simone, now mistress of the House on the Cliff, gazes out to sea with a satisfied smile on her face.

== Release ==
The series premiered on May 22, 2025.

== Reception ==
=== Critical response ===
The review aggregator website Rotten Tomatoes reported a 77% approval rating based on 64 critic reviews. The website's critics consensus reads, "Sirens sings a tune tried and true thanks to laudable performances by Julianne Moore, Meghann Fahy, and Milly Alcock." Metacritic, which uses a weighted average, gave a score of 66 out of 100 based on 30 critics, indicating "generally favorable" reviews.

Ben Travers of IndieWire gave the series an A− and said, "The top trio of stars all turn in fine performances, led by Moore finding just the right pitch for Michaela—believable and mystical, easy to stereotype yet hard to pin down. Reviewing the series for The Guardian, Lucy Mangan gave a rating of 5/5 and said "[t]his endlessly entertaining study in class and family is a witty, star-packed treat that zips through five tight episodes." Roxana Hadadi of Vulture wrote, "The show's appeal lies in its complicated depiction of bickering and bruising sisters, with prickly performances from Meghann Fahy and Milly Alcock giving the series an alluring and distinguishing jolt." John Anderson of The Wall Street Journal commented, "In Sirens, money simply provides the means to be the monster you are."

=== Viewership ===
For the week of May 19, Sirens was number 1 on the Nielsen U.S. ranking of streaming originals and the Overall Top 10, with about 1.4 billion minutes viewed for the series.

=== Accolades ===
| Award | Date of ceremony | Category | Recipient(s) | Result | Ref. |
|---|---|---|---|---|---|
| Critics' Choice Awards | January 4, 2026 | Best Actress in a Limited Series or Movie Made for Television | Meghann Fahy | Nominated | |
| Critics' Choice Awards | January 4, 2026 | Best Supporting Actress in a Limited Series or Movie Made for Television | Julianne Moore | Nominated | |
| Primetime Creative Arts Emmy Awards | September 6, 2025 | Outstanding Contemporary Costumes for a Limited or Anthology Series or Movie | Caroline Duncan, Paul Thompson, Tricia Barsamian, Heather Breen and Sarah Bacot (for "Exile") | Nominated | |
| Primetime Creative Arts Emmy Awards | September 6, 2025 | Outstanding Picture Editing for a Limited or Anthology Series or Movie | Catherine Haight (for "Exile") | Nominated | |
| Primetime Emmy Awards | September 14, 2025 | Outstanding Lead Actress in a Limited or Anthology Series or Movie | Meghann Fahy | Nominated | |
| Primetime Emmy Awards | September 14, 2025 | Outstanding Directing for a Limited or Anthology Series or Movie | Nicole Kassell (for "Exile") | Nominated | |
| Television Critics Association Awards | August 20, 2025 | Outstanding Achievement in Movies, Miniseries and Specials | Sirens | Nominated | |
| Writers Guild of America Awards | March 8, 2026 | Limited Series | Bekah Brunstetter, Dan LeFranc, Colin McKenna, Molly Smith Metzler | Nominated | |
