= Hand to Mouth: Living in Bootstrap America =

2014 book by Linda Tirado

- Author: Linda Tirado
- Language: English
- Subject: Poverty in the United States
- Publisher: Putnam Adult
- Publication date: 2014
- Publication place: United States
- Media type: Print, Kindle, Audio
- ISBN: 978-0399171987
- OCLC: 900901970

Hand to Mouth: Living in Bootstrap America is the debut book by author Linda Tirado. The book was released on 2 October 2014 and contains a foreword written by Barbara Ehrenreich.

== Production ==
Tirado, a 32-year-old mother of two who worked two low-paying jobs, wrote a message in response to the question "Why do poor people do things that seem so self-destructive?" on an online forum. Her response went viral and was subsequently reprinted by The Huffington Post, The Nation, and Forbes, in November 2013 under the title This Is Why Poor People's Bad Decisions Make Perfect Sense. Tirado subsequently received $60,000 in donations from concerned readers, and a book deal. The article was read by over 6 million people and led to Tirado receiving over 20,000 emails in one week. She wrote the book while she continued to work at an IHOP in Utah.

In November 2014, Tirado appeared on Real Time with Bill Maher and On Point to promote the book.

== Content ==
The book attempts to answer many questions that middle and upper-class people have about the working poor, such as why they eat junk food, have kids, smoke, drink and do drugs. Tirado states that all the answers to these questions relate to a simple lack of money—for example, minimum wage and no benefits result in long shifts and constant commuting, which results in fast food consumption being the only viable option. Having no time to plan ahead and save money results in a desire to have children now since there will never be a better time. Tirado makes no apologies for being a smoker, stating that smoking helps reduce hunger and relieves stress from working exhausting jobs. Chapter titles include "You Can't Pay a Doctor in Chickens Anymore", "I've Got Way Bigger Problems Than a Spinach Salad Can Solve", and "We Do Not Have Babies for Welfare Money". The book ends with an open letter to "rich people" regarding topics such as sex and parenting.

== Reception ==
Peter Coy from Bloomberg Businessweek gave a favourable review, calling it "funny, sarcastic, full of expletives, and most of all outrageously honest." Marcia Kaye from the Toronto Star also gave a favorable review, concluding the book was "provocative and controversial, and I wouldn't be the least surprised to see Tirado, in her thrift store sweater and ill-fitting jeans, running for office one day soon."

== See also ==
- Nickel and Dimed: On (Not) Getting By in America (2000), an investigative piece on poverty and minimum wage work by Barbara Ehrenreich, also of the Economic Hardship Program and who wrote the introduction to Maid
- Maid: Hard Work, Low Pay and a Mother's Will to Survive (2019) by Stephanie Land, also featuring an introduction by Barbara Ehrenreich
