= List of awards and nominations received by Margot Robbie =

Margot Robbie awards and nominations
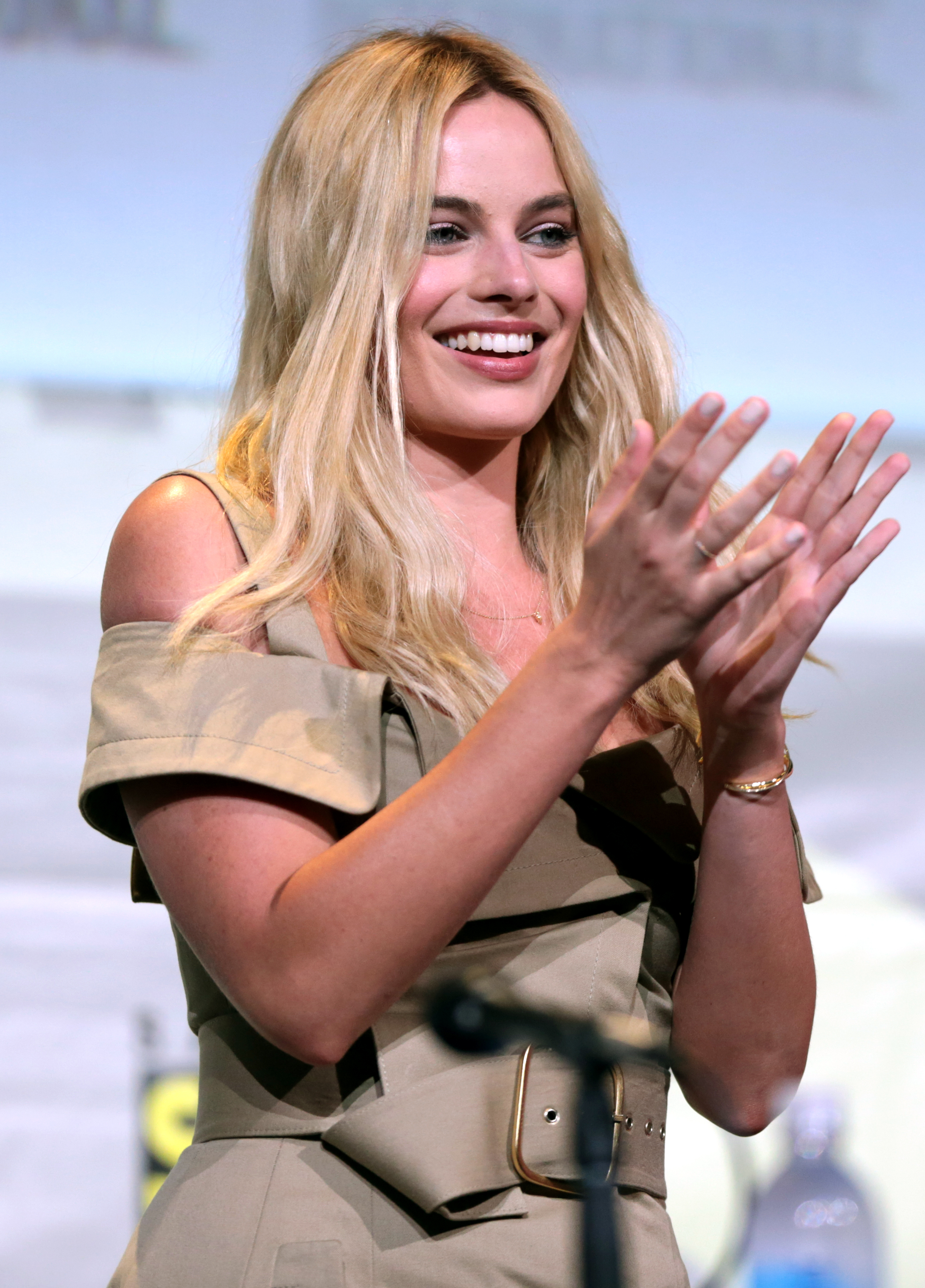
- Robbie in 2016
Awards and nominations
Award	Wins	Nominations
Academy Awards	0	3
Actor Awards	0	9
BAFTA Awards	0	7
Critics' Choice Awards	3	15
Golden Globe Awards	0	4

Totals (Note: Certain award groups do not simply award one winner. They acknowledge several different recipients, have runners-up, and have third place. Since this is a specific recognition and is different from losing an award, runner-up mentions are considered wins in this award tally. For simplification and to avoid errors, each award in this list has been presumed to have had a prior nomination.)
- Wins: 40
- Nominations: 137

Australian actress and producer Margot Robbie has received numerous accolades throughout her career, including seven AACTA Awards and three Critics' Choice Awards, along with nominations for three Academy Awards, seven British Academy Film Awards, four Golden Globe Awards and eight Screen Actors Guild Awards. Below is a complete list of her awards and nominations.

After playing minor roles in several films and television shows, Robbie starred in her first major role as Donna Freedman on the soap opera Neighbours (2008–2011), which she received a nomination for the Logie Award for Most Popular New Female Talent and Most Popular Actress. For her breakout role in Martin Scorsese's biographical black comedy film The Wolf of Wall Street (2013), she received an Empire Award for Best Female Newcomer. Since 2016, Robbie has received several awards and nominations, including one Critics' Choice Movie Award and one People's Choice Award for portraying the DC Extended Universe (DCEU) character Harley Quinn.

She co-produced and played figure skater Tonya Harding in I, Tonya (2017), a role that garnered her a nomination for Academy Award, BAFTA Award, and Golden Globe Award for Best Actress. The following year, Robbie played Elizabeth I in historical drama film Mary Queen of Scots, which nominated her for the BAFTA Award for Best Actress in a Supporting Role and the Screen Actors Guild Award for Outstanding Performance by a Female Actor in a Supporting Role. She starred in Jay Roach's drama Bombshell (2019), based upon the accounts of the women at Fox News who set out to expose CEO Roger Ailes for sexual harassment. Robbie's performance in the film garnered critical acclaim and earned her nominations for the Academy Award for Best Supporting Actress, the BAFTA Award for Best Actress in a Supporting Role, and the Golden Globe Award for Best Supporting Actress – Motion Picture. The same year, her performance in Quentin Tarantino's comedy-drama Once Upon a Time in Hollywood garnered her another nomination for BAFTA Award for Best Actress in a Supporting Role. Her two BAFTA nominations that year made her the ninth (and most recent) actor to be double nominated in the same category in the same year.

Robbie's performance as an aspiring actress in Babylon (2022) earned her nominations for the Critics' Choice, Golden Globe Awards for Best Actress and the Screen Actors Guild Award for Outstanding Performance by a Cast in a Motion Picture. The next year, she produced and starred as Barbie in the Greta Gerwig film of the same name, earning nominations for the BAFTA, Critics' Choice, Golden Globe and SAG Awards for Best Actress. As a producer of the film, she earned a nomination for the Academy Award for Best Picture. Also in 2023, she produced Saltburn, which earned her a nomination for the BAFTA Award for Outstanding British Film.

== Major associations ==
=== Academy Awards ===
Year	Category	Nominated work	Result	Ref.
2018	Best Actress	I, Tonya	Nominated	
2020	Best Supporting Actress	Bombshell	Nominated	
2024	Best Picture	Barbie	Nominated (Note: As Producer)	

=== Actor Awards ===
Year	Category	Nominated work	Result	Ref.
2018	Outstanding Performance by a Female Actor in a Leading Role	I, Tonya	Nominated	
2019	Outstanding Performamce by a Female Actor in a Supporting Role	Mary Queen of Scots	Nominated	
2020	Outstanding Performamce by a Female Actor in a Supporting Role	Bombshell	Nominated	
2020	Outstanding Performance by a Cast in a Motion Picture	Bombshell	Nominated (Note: Shared with the cast)	
2020	Outstanding Performance by a Cast in a Motion Picture	Once Upon a Time in Hollywood	Nominated	
2023	Outstanding Performance by a Cast in a Motion Picture	Babylon	Nominated	
2024	Outstanding Performance by a Cast in a Motion Picture	Barbie	Nominated	
2024	Outstanding Performance by a Female Actor in a Leading Role	Barbie	Nominated	

=== BAFTA Awards ===
Year	Category	Nominated work	Result	Ref.
British Academy Film Awards
2015	BAFTA Rising Star Award	—N/a	Nominated	
2018	Best Actress in a Leading Role	I, Tonya	Nominated	
2019	Best Actress in a Supporting Role	Mary Queen of Scots	Nominated	
2020	Best Actress in a Supporting Role	Bombshell	Nominated	
2020	Best Actress in a Supporting Role	Once Upon a Time in Hollywood	Nominated	
2024	Best Actress in a Leading Role	Barbie	Nominated	
2024	Outstanding British Film	Saltburn	Nominated	

=== Critics' Choice Awards ===
Year	Category	Nominated work	Result	Ref.
Film
2014	Best Acting Ensemble	The Wolf of Wall Street	Nominated	
2017	Best Actress in an Action Movie	Suicide Squad	Won	
2018	Best Actress in a Comedy Movie	I, Tonya	Won	
2018	Best Actress	I, Tonya	Nominated	
2018	Best Comedy	I, Tonya	Nominated	
2019	Best Acting Ensemble in a Movie	Once Upon a Time in Hollywood	Nominated	
2019	Best Acting Ensemble in a Movie	Bombshell	Nominated	
2019	Best Supporting Actress	Bombshell	Nominated	
2023	Best Actress	Babylon	Nominated	
2024	Best Picture	Saltburn	Nominated	
2024	Best Picture	Barbie	Nominated	
2024	Best Actress	Barbie	Nominated	
2024	Best Acting Ensemble	Barbie	Nominated	
Super Awards
2021	Best Actress in a Superhero Movie	Birds of Prey	Won	
2022	Best Actress in a Superhero Movie	The Suicide Squad	Nominated	

=== Golden Globe Awards ===
Year	Category	Nominated work	Result	Ref.
2018	Best Actress – Motion Picture Comedy or Musical	I, Tonya	Nominated	
2020	Best Supporting Actress – Motion Picture	Bombshell	Nominated	
2023	Best Actress – Motion Picture Comedy or Musical	Babylon	Nominated	
2024	Best Actress – Motion Picture Comedy or Musical	Barbie	Nominated	

== Other awards and nominations ==
=== AACTA Awards ===
The Australian Academy of Cinema and Television Arts Awards are presented annually by the Australian Academy of Cinema and Television Arts (AACTA) to recognize and honor achievements in the film and television industry.

Year	Nominated work	Category	Result	Ref.
2020	—	Audience Choice Award for Favourite Global Star of the Decade	Nominated	
2022	Amsterdam	Audience Choice Best Actress	Nominated	
2024	Barbie	Audience Choice Best Actress	Won	
2024	—	AACTA Trailblazer Award	Honored	

=== AACTA International Awards ===
The Australian Academy of Cinema and Television Arts Awards are presented annually by the Australian Academy of Cinema and Television Arts (AACTA) to recognize and honor achievements in the film and television industry.

Year	Nominated work	Category	Result	Ref.
2018	I, Tonya	Best Actress	Won	
2019	Mary Queen of Scots	Best Supporting Actress	Nominated	
2020	Bombshell	Best Supporting Actress	Won	
2020	Once Upon a Time in Hollywood	Best Supporting Actress	Nominated	
2021	Promising Young Woman	Best Film	Won	
2023	Babylon	Best Actress	Nominated	
2024	Barbie	Best Actress	Won	
2024	Barbie	Best Film	Won	

=== Astra Film Awards ===
Year	Nominated work	Category	Result	Ref.
2024	Barbie	Best Picture	Won	
2024	Barbie	Best Actress	Won (Note: Tied with Lily Gladstone for Killers of the Flower Moon.)	
2024	Barbie	Best Cast Ensemble	Nominated	

=== Awards Circuit Community Awards ===
Year	Nominated work	Category	Result	Ref.
2013	The Wolf of Wall Street	Best Actress in a Supporting Role	Nominated	
2017	I, Tonya	Best Actress in a Leading Role	Nominated	
2017	I, Tonya	Best Motion Picture	Nominated	

=== Blogos de Oro ===
Year	Nominated work	Category	Result	Ref.
2020	Once Upon a Time in Hollywood	Best Supporting Actress	Nominated	

=== BreakTudo Awards ===
Year	Nominated work	Category	Result	Ref.
2023	—N/a	International Actress	Nominated	

=== Capri Hollywood International Film Festival ===
Year	Nominated work	Category	Result	Ref.
2019	Once Upon a Time in Hollywood	Best Ensemble Cast	Won	

=== Chlotrudis Awards ===
Year	Nominated work	Category	Result	Ref.
2018	I, Tonya	Best Actress	Nominated	

=== CinEuphoria Awards ===
Year	Nominated work	Category	Result	Ref.
2020	Once Upon a Time in Hollywood	Best Ensemble – International Competition	Nominated	
2022	Promising Young Woman	Best Film - International Competition	Nominated	
2024	Barbie	Best Actress - Audience Award	Nominated	
2024	Babylon	Best Ensemble – International Competition	Nominated	
2024	Babylon	Best Actress - International Competition	Nominated	

=== Consequence's Annual Report ===
Year	Nominated work	Category	Result	Ref.
2023	Barbie	Film Performance of the Year	Won (Note: Shared with Cillian Murphy for Oppenheimer.)	

=== Dorian Awards ===
The Dorian Awards are presented by the Gay and Lesbian Entertainment Critics Association (GALECA).

Year	Nominated work	Category	Result	Ref.
2018	I, Tonya	Best Performance of the Year – Actress	Nominated	
2020	Bombshell	Supporting Film Performance of the Year — Actress	Nominated	

=== Elle Women in Hollywood Awards ===
Year	Nominated work	Category	Result	Ref.
2017	—N/a	Woman of the Year	Won	

=== Empire Awards ===
The Empire Awards were an annual British awards ceremony honouring cinematic achievements in the local and global film industry.

Year	Nominated work	Category	Result	Ref.
2014	The Wolf of Wall Street	Best Female Newcomer	Won	

=== Golden Tomato Awards ===
Year	Nominated work	Category	Result	Ref.
2019	—N/a	Fan Favorite Actress	Nominated	

=== Golden Schmoes Awards ===
Year	Nominated work	Category	Result	Ref.
2013	The Wolf of Wall Street	Best Supporting Actress of the Year	Nominated	
2013	The Wolf of Wall Street	Breakthrough Performance of the Year	Won	
2013	The Wolf of Wall Street	Best T&A of the Year	Won	
2015	Focus	Best T&A of the Year	Nominated	
2016	Suicide Squad	Best T&A of the Year	Won	
2016	Suicide Squad	Best Supporting Actress of the Year	Won	
2017	I, Tonya	Best Actress of the Year	Nominated	
2019	Once Upon a Time in Hollywood	Best T&A of the Year	Nominated	
2019	Once Upon a Time in Hollywood	Best Supporting Actress of the Year	Won	
2023	Barbie	Best Actress of the Year	Nominated	
2023	—N/a	Favorite Celebrity	Nominated	

=== Gotham Awards ===
Year	Nominated work	Category	Result	Ref.
2017	I, Tonya	Best Actress	Nominated	
2017	I, Tonya	Best Feature	Nominated	
2017	I, Tonya	Audience Award	Nominated	

=== Hollywood Film Awards ===
The Hollywood Film Awards are held annually to recognize talent in the film industry.

Year	Nominated work	Category	Result	Ref.
2017	I, Tonya	Hollywood Ensemble Award	Won	

=== IMDb STARmeter Awards ===
Year	Nominated work	Category	Result	Ref.
2014	—N/a	Top 10 Breakthrough Stars Award	Won	

=== Independent Spirit Awards ===
The Independent Spirit Awards are presented annually by Film Independent, to award best in the independent film community.

Year	Nominated work	Category	Result	Ref.
2018	I, Tonya	Best Female Lead	Nominated	

=== Jupiter Awards ===
Year	Nominated work	Category	Result	Ref.
2017	The Legend of Tarzan	Best International Actress	Nominated	

=== MTV Movie & TV Awards ===
The MTV Movie & TV Awards is an annual award show presented by MTV to honor outstanding achievements in films. Founded in 1992, the winners of the awards are decided online by the audience.

Year	Nominated work	Category	Result	Ref.
2014	The Wolf of Wall Street	Best Breakthrough Performance	Nominated	
2016	Focus	Best Kiss (Shared with Will Smith)	Nominated	
2021	Birds of Prey	Best Fight (Shared with Rosie Perez, Mary Elizabeth Winstead, and Jurnee Smollett)	Nominated	

=== Nickelodeon Australian Kids' Choice Awards ===
Year	Nominated work	Category	Result	Ref.
2009	—N/a	Favourite Aussie Hottie	Nominated	

=== Nickelodeon Kids' Choice Awards ===
Year	Nominated work	Category	Result	Ref.
2024	Barbie	Favorite Movie Actress	Won	

=== People's Choice Awards ===
The People's Choice Awards is an American awards show recognizing the people and the work of popular culture. The show has been held annually since 1975, and is voted on by the general public.

Year	Nominated work	Category	Result	Ref.
2017	Suicide Squad	Favorite Movie Actress	Nominated	
2017	Suicide Squad	Favorite Action Movie Actress	Won	
2020	Birds of Prey	The Action Movie Star of 2019	Nominated	
2020	Birds of Prey	The Female Movie Star of 2019	Nominated	
2021	The Suicide Squad	The Female Movie Star of 2021	Nominated	
2024	Barbie	The Female Movie Star of 2023	Won	
2024	Barbie	The Comedy Movie Star of 2023	Nominated	
2024	Barbie	The Movie of The Year of 2023	Won	
2024	Barbie	The Comedy Movie of The Year of 2023	Won	

=== Producers Guild of America Awards ===
Year	Nominated work	Category	Result	Ref.
2017	I, Tonya	Best Theatrical Motion Picture	Nominated	
2024	Barbie	Best Theatrical Motion Picture	Nominated	

=== San Francisco Film Awards Night ===
Year	Nominated work	Category	Result	Ref.
2022	Babylon	Maria Manetti Shrem Award for Acting	Won	

=== Santa Barbara International Film Festival ===
Year	Nominated work	Category	Result	Ref.
2018	I, Tonya	Outstanding Performer of the Year Award (Shared with Allison Janney)	Won	

=== Sant Jordi Awards ===
Year	Nominated work	Category	Result	Ref.
2020	Once Upon a Time in Hollywood	Best Actress in a Foreign Film	Won	

=== Satellite Awards ===
The Satellite Awards are a set of annual awards given by the International Press Academy.

Year	Nominated work	Category	Result	Ref.
2018	I, Tonya	Best Actress – Motion Picture	Nominated	
2019	Mary Queen of Scots	Best Supporting Actress – Motion Picture	Nominated	
2020	Bombshell	Best Supporting Actress – Motion Picture	Nominated	
2021	Birds of Prey	Best Actress in a Motion Picture – Comedy or Musical	Nominated	
2023	Babylon	Best Actress in a Motion Picture – Comedy or Musical	Nominated	
2024	Barbie	Best Actress in a Motion Picture – Comedy or Musical	Nominated	

=== Saturn Awards ===
The Saturn Awards are presented annually by the Academy of Science Fiction, Fantasy, and Horror Films to honor science fiction, fantasy, and horror films, television, and home video.

Year	Nominated work	Category	Result	Ref.
2017	Suicide Squad	Best Supporting Actress	Nominated	
2021	Birds of Prey	Best Actress	Nominated	
2024	Barbie	Best Actress	Won	

=== Teen Choice Awards ===
The Teen Choice Awards is an annual awards show that airs on the Fox Network. The awards honor the year's biggest achievements in music, movies, sports, television, fashion, and other categories, voted by teen viewers.

Year	Nominated work	Category	Result	Ref.
2016	Suicide Squad	Choice Movie Actress: AnTEENcipated	Nominated	

=== Women's Image Network Awards ===
Year	Nominated work	Category	Result	Ref.
2019	Mary Queen of Scots	Supporting Actress Feature Film	Nominated	

=== Young Hollywood Awards ===
The Young Hollywood Awards honor young people's achievements in music, film, sports, television, and sports.

Year	Nominated work	Category	Result	Ref.
2014	—N/a	Breakthrough Actress	Nominated	

== Critics associations ==
Year	Nominated work	Category	Result	Ref.
Alliance of Women Film Journalists
2016	The Legend of Tarzan	Actress Most in Need of a New Agent	Nominated	
2016	Suicide Squad	Actress Most in Need of a New Agent	Nominated	
2016	Suicide Squad	Hall of Shame (shared with David Ayer)	Nominated	
2017	I, Tonya	Best Actress	Nominated	
2017	I, Tonya	Bravest Performance	Won (Note: Tied with Sally Hawkins for The Shape of Water.)	
2022	Babylon	She Deserves a New Agent	Nominated	
2023	Barbie	Best Actress	Nominated	
2023	Barbie	Outstanding Achievement by a Woman in the Film Industry	Nominated	
Austin Film Critics Association
2018	I, Tonya	Best Actress	Nominated	
2024	Barbie	Best Actress	Nominated	
Boston Society of Film Critics
2013	The Wolf of Wall Street	Best Cast	Nominated	
Chicago Film Critics Association
2017	I, Tonya	Best Actress	Nominated	
2023	Barbie	Best Actress	Nominated	
Chicago Indie Critics
2021	Promising Young Woman	Best Independent Film	Nominated	
2024	Barbie	Best Studio Film	Nominated	
Columbus Film Critics Association
2018	I, Tonya	Best Actress	Nominated	
2023	Babylon	Leading Performance	Nominated	
2024	Barbie	Leading Performance	Nominated	
Dallas–Fort Worth Film Critics Association
2017	I, Tonya	Best Actress	3rd Place	
2019	Bombshell	Best Supporting Actress	2nd Place	
Denver Film Critics Society
2018	I, Tonya	Best Actress	Nominated	
2024	Barbie	Best Actress	Nominated	
Detroit Film Critics Society
2013	The Wolf of Wall Street	Best Ensemble	Nominated	
2017	I, Tonya	Best Actress	Nominated	
2019	Once Upon a Time in Hollywood	Best Ensemble	Won	
Florida Film Critics Circle
2017	I, Tonya	Best Actress	Won (Note: Tied with Isla Fisher for The Beach Bum.)	
2017	I, Tonya	Best Cast	Runner-up	
2019	Bombshell	Best Supporting Actress	Runner-up	
2022	Babylon	Best Cast	Runner-up	
Georgia Film Critics Association
2014	The Wolf of Wall Street	Best Supporting Actress	Nominated	
2018	I, Tonya	Best Actress	Nominated	
2020	Once Upon a Time in Hollywood	Best Supporting Actress	Nominated	
Greater Western New York Film Critics Association
2022	Babylon	Best Actress	Nominated	
Hawaii Film Critics Society
2018	I, Tonya	Best Actress	Nominated	
2020	Bombshell	Best Supporting Actress	Nominated	
2023	Babylon	Best Actress	Nominated	
2024	Barbie	Best Actress	Nominated	
Hollywood Critics Association
2019	Once Upon a Time in Hollywood	Best Supporting Actress	Nominated	
2019	Once Upon a Time in Hollywood	Best Cast	Nominated	
Hollywood Critics Association Midseason
2020	Birds of Prey	Best Actress	Runner-up	
Houston Film Critics Society
2018	I, Tonya	Best Actress	Nominated	
2020	Bombshell	Best Supporting Actress	Nominated	
2024	Barbie	Best Actress	Nominated	
Indiana Film Journalists Association
2016	Suicide Squad	Best Supporting Actress	Nominated	
2019	Bombshell	Best Supporting Actress	Nominated	
2019	Once Upon a Time in Hollywood	Best Supporting Actress	Nominated	
2020	Birds of Prey	Best Actress	Nominated	
2023	Barbie	Best Actress	Nominated	
Iowa Film Critics Association
2019	Bombshell	Best Supporting Actress	Nominated	
2019	Once Upon a Time in Hollywood	Best Supporting Actress	Nominated	
Las Vegas Film Critics Society
2017	I, Tonya	Best Actress	Runner-up	
2019	Bombshell	Best Supporting Actress	Won	
Latino Entertainment Journalists Association
2020	Bombshell	Best Performance by an Actress in a Supporting Role	Nominated	
2021	Promising Young Woman	Best Picture	Nominated	
2024	Barbie	Best Picture	Nominated	
London Film Critics' Circle
2019	Bombshell	Supporting Actress of the Year	Nominated	
Los Angeles Online Film Critics Society Awards
2017	I, Tonya	Best Actress	Nominated	
Minnesota Film Critics Association
2021	Promising Young Woman	Best Picture	Runner-up	
2024	Barbie	Best Picture	Runner-up	
2024	Barbie	Best Actress	Nominated	
Music City Film Critics Association
2021	Promising Young Woman	Best Film	Won	
2023	Babylon	Best Actress	Nominated	
2024	Barbie	Best Actress	Nominated	
2024	Barbie	Best Picture	Nominated	
New York Film Critics Online
2017	I, Tonya	Best Actress	Won	
North Carolina Film Critics Association
2020	Once Upon a Time in Hollywood	Best Supporting Actress	Nominated	
2023	Barbie	Best Actress	Nominated	
North Dakota Film Critics Association
2020	Once Upon a Time in Hollywood	Best Supporting Actress	Nominated	
2021	Promising Young Woman	Best Picture	Nominated	
2023	Babylon	Best Actress	Nominated	
North Texas Film Critics Association
2017	I, Tonya	Best Actress	4th place	
2023	Barbie	Best Actress	Nominated	
Online Association of Female Film Critics
2019	Bombshell	Best Supporting Actress	Nominated	
2023	Barbie	Best Actress	Nominated	
Online Film Critics Society
2017	I, Tonya	Best Actress	Nominated	
2019	Once Upon a Time in Hollywood	Best Supporting Actress	Nominated	
2023	Barbie	Best Actress	Nominated	
Online Film & Television Association
2018	I, Tonya	Best Actress	Nominated	
2020	Once Upon a Time in Hollywood	Best Ensemble	Nominated	
2024	Barbie	Best Ensemble	Runner-up	
2024	Barbie	Best Actress	Nominated	
Phoenix Critics Circle
2017	I, Tonya	Best Actress	Nominated	
2019	Bombshell	Best Supporting Actress	Nominated	
2023	Barbie	Best Actress	Nominated	
Phoenix Film Critics Society
2017	I, Tonya	Best Actress in a Leading Role	Nominated	
Portland Critics Association
2023	Babylon	Best Actress in a Leading Role	Nominated	
2023	Barbie	Best Actress in a Leading Role	Nominated	
San Diego Film Critics Society
2017	I, Tonya	Best Actress	Nominated	
2019	Once Upon a Time in Hollywood	Best Ensemble Performance	Nominated	
2023	Barbie	Best Actress	Nominated	
San Francisco Bay Area Film Critics Circle
2017	I, Tonya	Best Actress	Won	
2019	Bombshell	Best Supporting Actress	Nominated	
2024	Barbie	Best Actress	Nominated	
Seattle Film Critics
2014	The Wolf of Wall Street	Best Ensemble Cast	Nominated	
Seattle Film Critics Society
2018	I, Tonya	Best Actress in a Leading Role	Nominated	
2023	Babylon	Best Actress in a Leading Role	Nominated	
2024	Barbie	Best Actress in a Leading Role	Nominated	
St. Louis Film Critics Association
2019	Bombshell	Best Supporting Actress	Won	
2019	Once Upon a Time in Hollywood	Best Supporting Actress	Won	
2023	Barbie	Best Actress	Runner-up	
UK Film Critics Association
2023	Barbie	Best Actress	Nominated	
Washington D.C. Area Film Critics Association
2017	I, Tonya	Best Actress	Nominated	
2019	Once Upon a Time in Hollywood	Best Ensemble	Nominated	
2023	Barbie	Best Actress	Nominated	
Women Film Critics Circle
2017	I, Tonya	Best Comedic Actress	Nominated	
