= Linda Tirado =

American author and political activist

- Born: 1981 or 1982 (age 44–45)
- Occupations: Author, photographer, activist
- Works: Hand to Mouth: Living in Bootstrap America

Linda Tirado (born 1981 or 1982) is an American author, freelance photographer and political activist. Her memoir Hand to Mouth: Living in Bootstrap America is about her life as a member of the working poor. She has also written articles for The Guardian, The Daily Beast and other online periodicals. In 2014, she was included in the BBC's 100 Women.

== Early life and education ==
Tirado attended Cedar City High School and Southern Utah University. She did not finish her college degree.

== Career ==
Tirado first came to public attention in October 2013 when a comment she made about living in poverty on a Gawker Media website, Gawker, under the handle, Killer Martinis, went viral; she later expanded it into her book, Hand to Mouth: Living in Bootstrap America. Peter Coy from Bloomberg Businessweek gave the book a favourable review, calling it "funny, sarcastic, full of expletives, and most of all outrageously honest." Marcia Kaye from the Toronto Star also gave a favorable review, concluding the book was "provocative and controversial, and I wouldn't be the least surprised to see Tirado, in her thrift store sweater and ill-fitting jeans, running for office one day soon."

Shortly after Tirado's Killer Martinis post, an article in the Houston Press argued she had had a comfortable life, working in politics since 2004. It also erroneously claimed she had attended a boarding school. The writer attacked Tirado for purveying poverty porn, describing poverty through negative stereotypes those who have never experienced it would expect to read. Tirado had disclosed this background herself on a GoFundMe page she was running; while she described her essay as "impressionistic" she made public records showing that for several years she and her family had received Medicaid, welfare and WIC.

In May 2020, she was injured in her left eye while she was covering the George Floyd protests in Minneapolis–Saint Paul. Tirado believed the injury was caused by a rubber bullet fired by the police, though it was later reported to be a sponge bullet. Following surgery, the prognosis was that she would be blind in that eye. She returned to work the following day. Tirado filed suit against the Minneapolis Police Department around June 14, 2020. On May 26, 2022, in the protest aftermath, the Minneapolis City Council agreed to a $600,000 legal settlement. She gave $120,000 away to people and community organizations in Minneapolis.

Tirado has also written articles for The Guardian, The Daily Beast and other online periodicals.

== Honors ==
In 2014, Tirado was included in the BBC's 100 Women. In August 2020, she received the John Aubuchon Press Freedom Award from the National Press Club.

== Personal life ==
Tirado wrote Hand to Mouth while living in Utah. As of 2014, she lived in Washington, D.C., with her husband and two daughters.

In June 2024, people close to Tirado reported that she was in hospice care due to her 2020 traumatic brain injury. Tirado later confirmed she was not in hospice.
