= Maid (miniseries) =

American drama limited series

- Promotional poster
- Genre: Drama
- Created by: Molly Smith Metzler
- Inspired by: Maid: Hard Work, Low Pay, and a Mother's Will to Survive by Stephanie Land
- Starring: Margaret Qualley; Nick Robinson; Anika Noni Rose; Tracy Vilar; Billy Burke; Andie MacDowell
- Music by: Chris Stracey; Este Haim
- Country of origin: United States
- Original language: English
- No. of episodes: 10

Production
- Executive producers: John Wells; Molly Smith Metzler; Margot Robbie; Tom Ackerley; Erin Jontow; Brett Hedblom; Stephanie Land
- Producers: Colin McKenna; Terri Murphy; Bonnie R. Benwick
- Production location: Victoria, British Columbia
- Cinematography: Quyen Tran; Guy Godfree; Vincent De Paula
- Editors: Annie Eifrig; Annette Davey; Jacquelyn Le
- Running time: 47–60 minutes
- Production companies: John Wells Productions; LuckyChap Entertainment; Warner Bros. Television

Original release
- Network: Netflix
- Release: October 1, 2021

Maid is an American drama limited series created for Netflix by Molly Smith Metzler. The series is inspired by Stephanie Land's memoir Maid: Hard Work, Low Pay, and a Mother's Will to Survive. Its story focuses on a young mother who escapes an abusive relationship and struggles to provide for her daughter by getting a job cleaning houses. It premiered on Netflix on October 1, 2021.

Maid became Netflix's fourth-most-watched show of the year. Its accolades include three Primetime Emmy Award nominations, including an acting nomination for Margaret Qualley, and three Golden Globe nominations. Qualley was also nominated for a Critics' Choice Television Award and a Screen Actors Guild Award. In addition, the American Film Institute named it one of the ten best television programs of 2021.

== Premise ==
Alex leaves her abusive boyfriend, moves into a shelter with their toddler daughter, and gets a job cleaning houses for Value Maids. The show follows Alex's struggle to raise a young child, deal with an abusive ex-boyfriend and her own dysfunctional family, and navigate the red tape of government assistance, while working as a maid and dreaming of a future as a writer. The story takes place near Seattle with Alex frequently taking a ferry to the fictional Fisher Island.

== Cast and characters ==
=== Main ===
- Margaret Qualley as Alexandra "Alex" Russell, a young mother who leaves her emotionally abusive boyfriend, taking their two-year-old daughter Maddy and getting a job working as a maid.
- Nick Robinson as Sean Boyd, Alex's abusive ex and the father of her daughter, Maddy.
- Anika Noni Rose as Regina Campbell, a wealthy lawyer and client of Alex's
- Tracy Vilar as Yolanda, Alex's boss at Value Maids
- Billy Burke as Hank, Alex's estranged father
- Andie MacDowell as Paula Langley, Alex's mother who is narcissistic and has severe bipolar disorder

=== Recurring ===
- Rylea Nevaeh Whittet as Maddy Boyd, Alex and Sean's lively toddler daughter who turns three years old in the sixth episode
- Xavier De Guzman as Ethan, Sean's best friend
- Raymond Ablack as Nate, an acquaintance from Alex's past
- BJ Harrison as Denise, the woman who runs the domestic violence shelter
- Christie Burke as Tania, a friend of Sean and Alex
- Toby Levins as Basil, Paula's boyfriend

=== Guest stars ===
- Aimee Carrero as Danielle, a woman staying in the domestic violence shelter whom Alex befriends
- Mozhan Marnò as Tara, Alex's lawyer
- Théodore Pellerin as Wayne, Alex’s Tinder date

== Episodes ==
| No. | Title | Directed by | Written by | Original release date | Prod. code |
|---|---|---|---|---|---|
| 1 | "Dollar Store" | John Wells | Molly Smith Metzler | October 1, 2021 | T13.22651 |
Alex Russell, a young mother living in Port Hampstead, Washington, leaves her alcoholic, emotionally abusive boyfriend Sean in the middle of the night, taking their two-year-old daughter Maddy with her. Forced to sleep in her car and with almost no money, Alex meets with a social worker who informs her that she needs to present two pay stubs to qualify for subsidized housing. The only available job is at Value Maids, a cleaning company where she is hired by the owner on a trial basis. Her first cleaning job is at a lavish home on Fisher Island owned by the wealthy Regina. Alex has her manic, freewheeling mother Paula babysit Maddy. After returning from her shift, she finds out that Paula has returned Maddy to Sean. Alex rushes to Sean's trailer and takes Maddy back despite his protests. Her boss, Yolanda, calls to report that Regina was not happy with her cleaning. Alex opts to return to complete the job, but she and Maddy get into a car crash on the way there. She has her estranged father Hank drop them at the ferry station and with no other alternative, has no choice but to spend the night on the ferry station floor with Maddy.
| 2 | "Ponies" | John Wells | Molly Smith Metzler | October 1, 2021 | T13.22652 |
Flashbacks show Alex first meeting Sean while reciting some of her personal writing at a restaurant. In the present, while still on the ferry station floor, Alex encounters an old friend, Nate, who buys them breakfast and gives her a lift back to Value Maids. Despite pleading and trying to explain herself, Yolanda still fires her. Alex is contacted by Sean's lawyer, who informs her that Sean has filed to claim full custody of Maddy. Alex's social worker advises that she take refuge at a nearby domestic violence shelter. While there, Alex befriends Danielle, a fellow resident. Alex loses her court case and Sean is granted full custody of Maddy until the court reconvenes in seven days. Danielle learns that Regina never paid Alex for her cleaning shift, and helps Alex steal Regina's dog. Regina is initially irate and threatens to call the police, but Alex stands up to her, making her feel guilty. Regina later sends the full payment to Alex. To Alex's shock, she discovers that Danielle has checked herself out of the shelter to return to her ex. The shelter's owner, Denise, informs her that most women finally leave after 7 attempts and that she herself, left her abusive ex-husband, after 5. In her journal, Alex recounts the souring of her relationship with Sean after she chose to not have an abortion.
| 3 | "Sea Glass" | Nzingha Stewart | Marcus Gardley | October 1, 2021 | T13.22653 |
Denise introduces Alex to a lawyer who advises that, while the legal system does not equate emotional abuse with domestic violence, her claim may still grant her joint custody of Maddy. After a particularly grueling cleaning shift, Alex finds Sean drunk at a bar with friends and chastises him for his negligent parenting. Alex attempts to obtain a statement from her mother Paula as a character witness to attest to Alex's fitness as a parent, but Paula is inattentive and the two have a bitter argument. Alex learns that Sean missed a bartending shift for the first time and discovers him intoxicated on the beach, reeling from the breakdown of their relationship. She reminds him of the responsibility of being a parent and brings him home. The next day Sean drops his court case and agrees to share custody of Maddy. Alex and Maddy arrive at their new subsidized housing unit and find that Paula has painted it for them.
| 4 | "Cashmere" | Nzingha Stewart | Rebecca Brunstetter | October 1, 2021 | T13.22654 |
Alex's acquaintance Nate, who is recently divorced and living on Fisher Island, provides her with a car. Alex is grateful but politely declines Nate's romantic advances. On Thanksgiving Day, Alex works a shift at Regina's house while Regina is away with her husband. After the job is complete, Alex drinks some of Regina's wine, tries on her clothes, and invites a Tinder date, Wayne, to the house, claiming it to be her own. Regina returns home that night and Wayne sneaks out. Regina is miserable after being asked for a divorce by her husband. She shares with Alex that she struggled to become pregnant and that she and her husband are expecting a child with a surrogate. She advises Alex not to let anyone take advantage of her. Alex writes in her journal about how even the wealthy may be deeply unhappy. Prior to picking up Maddy from Sean's care, Alex texts Wayne with the truth about her circumstances.
| 5 | "Thief" | Lila Neugebauer | Colin McKenna | October 1, 2021 | T13.22655 |
Alex struggles to pay tuition for Maddy's daycare, and Maddy becomes ill from black mold at the subsidized housing unit. They are forced to vacate and Sean is working, so Alex reluctantly takes Maddy to her estranged father Hank. While cleaning a house in the woods that once belonged to an infamous local thief ("Barefoot Billy"), Alex briefly gets trapped in a crawlspace and suffers a panic attack. She later learns that her mother is missing and while searching for her, she sees Danielle who pretends not to know Alex once her boyfriend appears. Alex deliberately reenters the crawlspace in Barefoot Billy's house after the cleaning job is complete, and recalls that she and Paula fled home because Hank was physically abusive to Paula. Alex immediately removes Maddy from Hank's home and goes to stay with Paula, who has returned after spontaneously marrying her boyfriend, Basil.
| 6 | "M" | Helen Shaver | Michelle Denise Jackson | October 1, 2021 | T13.22656 |
Alex searches for a new home, but struggles to find a landlord willing to accept a TBRA voucher. She grows closer with Regina while sharing mothering advice for Regina's surrogate child. After witnessing negligence at Maddy's daycare, Alex decides to find Maddy a better daycare center. Nate puts her in contact with a Fisher Island nursery school, where Alex learns she will be eligible for a needs-based scholarship if she can provide proof of residence on the island. She finds an apartment whose landlords agree to let Alex barter for half the rent by providing landscaping services, and they offer Alex the use of their home for Maddy's third birthday party. During the party, Sean becomes intoxicated, breaks into the house, and falls asleep on a couch. Alex is forced to leave, and she and Maddy temporarily move into Nate's house.
| 7 | "String Cheese" | Helen Shaver | Rebecca Brunstetter | October 1, 2021 | T13.22657 |
After Yolanda is unable to give her extra shifts, Alex visits a Value Maids client herself and offers a cheaper cleaning rate. Alex learns that Basil disappeared with his trailer and rented out Paula's family home under his name, leaving Paula homeless; Paula temporarily takes refuge at Nate's home. During dinner, Nate confides his feelings for Alex, but Alex gently declines. Sean interrupts, having recovered Paula's mortgage papers and learned that the property she owns is facing foreclosure. Alex, Sean and Paula track down Basil to a casino, discovering that he is a con man and gambling addict who recently lost all of Paula's mortgage money. A heartbroken Paula takes out her anger on Alex and vanishes; Alex and Sean find her attempting to break into her family home and realize she has severely cut her wrists after breaking one of the front windows. Paula is rushed to the hospital while Sean comforts a traumatized Alex; the two return to Sean's trailer and have sex.
| 8 | "Bear Hunt" | Quyen Tran | Marcus Gardley and Molly Smith Metzler | October 1, 2021 | T13.22658 |
Nate has Alex move out of his house after learning she had sex with Sean, but allows her to keep his car. Alex and Maddy have no choice but to move back into Sean's trailer. Sean is learning carpentry from Hank, who is also his AA sponsor. While cleaning Regina's house, Alex receives a call from the University of Montana informing her that she is allowed to reapply for her previous creative writing scholarship. Yolanda fires Alex, after discovering that Alex stole one of her clients, but Regina offers Alex weekly shifts and a ferry pass, which she happily accepts. Alex learns that Basil discharged Paula from the psychiatric hospital. While at her friend's wedding, Alex is overjoyed to learn that she has been accepted for the scholarship, but Sean is enraged that she is deciding to move away with Maddy without asking him. The following morning, Alex learns that Sean returned Nate's car, effectively ruining any chances of going to Montana, and breaks down crying.
| 9 | "Sky Blue" | John Wells | Colin McKenna | October 1, 2021 | T13.22659 |
Alex spends several days in Sean's trailer in a deep depression, while Sean resumes drinking. Hank visits for dinner, and Alex says that she does not want to eat with them. Sean forces her to join them at the table and Hank does nothing to intervene. Sean is fired from his bartending job, comes home drunk, and, after Alex berates him for spending his scarce money on beer, throws a glass jug towards her, which narrowly misses her head. Alex frantically looks for Maddy and discovers her hiding inside a cupboard, causing Alex to have a flashback of her doing the same when she was a child. They flee the trailer on foot and Alex contacts Regina, asking to be dropped off at the domestic violence shelter. The shelter provides her with free clothes and a new phone. When Regina reads the notebook Alex accidentally left behind in her office, she is impressed with Alex's skill. She puts Alex in contact with a high-powered family lawyer who can ensure she leaves for college with custody of Maddy. Alex makes considerable money cleaning the homes of hoarders, applies for housing and financial aid at Missoula, and buys a used car. She serves Sean with the relocation papers, but Sean refuses to give up custody of Maddy and decides to take the case to court. Alex meets with her mother - now selling art at a flea market with her new boyfriend, Micah - and informs her she is going to college. She follows Paula's car afterwards and discovers that Paula is homeless.
| 10 | "Snaps" | John Wells | Molly Smith Metzler | October 1, 2021 | T13.22660 |
After discovering Paula's homelessness, Alex offers for Paula to come with her and Maddy to Missoula, which Paula rejects. Sean rejects Alex's ex parte motion for custody of Maddy, citing lack of evidence of abuse, and requests supervised visitation. All of this hinders Alex's upcoming college plans to move to Montana. Alex has Paula supervise Sean's visitation session with Maddy. She visits Hank, hoping to use him as a character witness of Sean's abuse, but Hank refuses to testify, empathizing instead with Sean's struggles with alcoholism. After yelling at Maddy and causing her to have a meltdown during their visitation, Sean admits to Alex that his alcoholism is endangering Maddy and making him unfit to be a father. He signs over full custody of Maddy and drops the court case. Paula asks if she can still move to Montana with her, which Alex accepts, but Paula reneges the next day, opting to stay with Micah and encouraging Alex to pursue her future. With nothing left holding her back, Alex and Maddy depart for Missoula.

== Production ==
=== Development ===
On November 20, 2019, Netflix gave production a series order inspired by New York Times best-selling memoir Maid: Hard Work, Low Pay, and a Mother's Will to Survive by Stephanie Land. The series was created by Molly Smith Metzler who was also an executive producer alongside John Wells, Erin Jontow, Margot Robbie, Tom Ackerley, Brett Hedblom, and Land. Production companies involved with the series consisted of John Wells Productions, LuckyChap Entertainment, and Warner Bros. Television. Directors of the series included Wells, Nzingha Stewart, Lila Neugebauer, Helen Shaver, and Quyen "Q" Tran. The limited series was released on October 1, 2021.

=== Casting ===
In August 2020, Margaret Qualley and Nick Robinson were cast in leading roles. On September 14, 2020, Anika Noni Rose joined the cast in a leading role. In October 2020, Andie MacDowell, Tracy Vilar, and Billy Burke joined the cast in leading roles. On November 25, 2020, Xavi de Guzman joined the cast in a recurring role. Aimee Carrero landed a role as Danielle, who is a fellow survivor of domestic abuse and becomes friends with Alex, Margaret Qualley's character, at the women's shelter.

=== Filming ===
Principal photography for the series began on September 28, 2020, and concluded on April 9, 2021, in Victoria, British Columbia.

== Reception ==
=== Audience viewership ===
According to Netflix, Maid has been viewed by estimated 67 million households, becoming the streaming service's fourth-most-watched show in 2021. In the streaming rankings for the week of October 4 to 10, Maid doubled its viewing time from the previous week and climbed to second place behind Squid Game with 1.9 billion minutes of viewing time.

Specifically, in the Netflix's Top 10 TV English titles ranking, during its debut week, Maid placed at number two just two days after its release with 61.08 million hours viewed. The following week, it topped the chart and garnered 166.52 million viewing hours. In its third week, it ranked at number two and generated 129.28 million viewing hours. The series remained in the chart for 13 weeks until December 26, 2021.

=== Critical response ===
The review aggregator website Rotten Tomatoes reported a 94% approval rating with an average rating of 8.2/10, based on 49 critic reviews. The website's critics consensus reads, "Maid takes great care with its sensitive subject matter to craft a drama that is not always easy to watch, but undeniably powerful, grounded by an outstanding performance by Margaret Qualley." Metacritic, which uses a weighted average, assigned a score of 82 out of 100 based on 19 critics, indicating "universal acclaim".

Kristen Lopez of IndieWire gave the series an A and wrote, "We need more stories like this and, hands down, Maid deserves all the acclaim it gets." Reviewing the series for Rolling Stone, Alan Sepinwall gave a rating of four out of five stars and said, "Parts of it are deliberately difficult to get through, yet the show is surprisingly watchable given the nature of the story, and at times even light and charming. Much of this is a credit to Qualley, who delivers a movie-star-level performance." Kelly Lawler of USA Today stated, "The drama offers a blistering portrayal of the realities of poverty as seen through the eyes of Alex, who suffers a series of angering and unjust events as she tries to protect herself and her young daughter." Inkoo Kang of The Washington Post commented, "It's the mother-daughter bond – and strain – that shines brightest. Qualley and MacDowell are each other's best scene partners."

Violence researcher Margunn Bjørnholt wrote that the series has received praise for "the way it depicts the violence and for painting a nuanced picture of the violent boyfriend."

The American Film Institute named the series one of the ten best television programs of the year.

=== Awards and nominations ===
| Year | Award | Category | Nominee(s) | Result | Ref. |
|---|---|---|---|---|---|
| 2021 | American Film Institute Awards | Top 10 Programs of the Year | Maid | Won | |
| 2021 | 12th Hollywood Music in Media Awards | Original Score — TV Show/Limited Series | Chris Stracey & Este Haim | Nominated | |
| 2022 | 26th Satellite Awards | Best Miniseries | Maid | Nominated | |
| 2022 | 12th Critics' Choice Television Awards | Best Limited Series | Maid | Nominated | |
| 2022 | 12th Critics' Choice Television Awards | Best Actress in a Limited Series or Movie Made for Television | Margaret Qualley | Nominated | |
| 2022 | 79th Golden Globe Awards | Best Miniseries or Television Film | Maid | Nominated | |
| 2022 | 79th Golden Globe Awards | Best Actress in a Miniseries or Television Film | Margaret Qualley | Nominated | |
| 2022 | 79th Golden Globe Awards | Best Supporting Actress in a Series, Miniseries or Television Film | Andie MacDowell | Nominated | |
| 2022 | 28th Screen Actors Guild Awards | Outstanding Performance by a Female Actor in a Miniseries or Television Movie | Margaret Qualley | Nominated | |
| 2022 | 74th Writers Guild of America Awards | Adapted Long Form | Bekah Brunstetter, Marcus Gardley, Michelle Denise Jackson, Colin McKenna, Molly Smith Metzler | Won | |
| 2022 | 38th TCA Awards | Individual Achievement in Drama | Margaret Qualley | Nominated | |
| 2022 | 38th TCA Awards | Outstanding Achievement in Movies, Miniseries and Specials | Maid | Nominated | |
| 2022 | 2nd Hollywood Critics Association TV Awards | Best Streaming Limited or Anthology Series | Maid | Nominated | |
| 2022 | 2nd Hollywood Critics Association TV Awards | Best Actress in a Streaming Limited or Anthology Series | Margaret Qualley | Nominated | |
| 2022 | 2nd Hollywood Critics Association TV Awards | Best Supporting Actress in a Streaming Limited or Anthology Series | Andie MacDowell | Nominated | |
| 2022 | 74th Primetime Emmy Awards | Outstanding Lead Actress in a Limited or Anthology Series or Movie | Margaret Qualley | Nominated | |
| 2022 | 74th Primetime Emmy Awards | Outstanding Directing for a Limited or Anthology Series or Movie | John Wells (for "Sky Blue") | Nominated | |
| 2022 | 74th Primetime Emmy Awards | Outstanding Writing for a Limited or Anthology Series or Movie | Molly Smith Metzler (for "Snaps") | Nominated | |
