= Sélincourt =

Sélincourt or Selincourt may refer to:

- Agnes de Selincourt (1872–1917), Christian missionary in India
- Aubrey de Sélincourt (1894–1962), English writer, classical scholar and translator
- Basil de Sélincourt (1877–1966), British essayist and journalist
- Ernest de Sélincourt (1870–1943), British literary scholar and critic
- Hugh de Sélincourt (1878–1951), English author and journalist
