= I.C.U. (film) =

- Film poster
- Directed by: Aash Aaron
- Written by: Aash Aaron
- Produced by: Carlos Alperin
- Starring: Margot Robbie; Christian Radford; Natalie Hoflin; Ozzie Devrish
- Cinematography: Dirk Foulger
- Edited by: Aash Aaron
- Music by: Kit Sivyer
- Distributed by: Osiris Entertainment
- Release date: 11 November 2009
- Running time: 85 minutes
- Country: Australia
- Language: English

I.C.U is a 2009 Australian thriller film directed by Aash Aaron. It is Margot Robbie's second film role. It tells the story of three bored people who, after filming and spying on their neighbours, are targeted by a serial killer.

== Plot ==
Young Tristen Waters, her brother Troy and his friend Ricky go to their father William's holiday home, spending most of their time alone while William works as a policeman to pay off the damage caused by the gambling problem that ended his marriage with Tristan and Troy's mother. While there, the three of them start to spy on their neighbours and soon notice that one of their neighbours is hiring prostitutes who go into the house but never come out. When the man discovers they are filming him, they hide in the flat, only to be found and tied up by the murderer later. William shows up and a fight ensues, causing him to be knocked out. He later awakens and tells the killer "I thought I told you to wait till their mother was here" before shooting him to death.

Frantic, William prepares to kill his children, only to be stabbed to death by his ex-wife. It is then revealed that his ex-wife is the killer of the prostitutes and has been filming the murders after the bodies were supplied to her by the pimp. She finds a text sent to her saying "I C U." She notices a camera in the room, one of the many cameras that are planted all over the hotel, and seems to recognise the person operating them. The person operating the cameras is left unknown.

== Cast ==
- Margot Robbie as Tristen Waters
- Christian Radford as Troy Waters
- Matt Flannagan as William Waters
- James Dean as Ricky Dickson
- Aash Aaron as Detective Al Stewart
- Ozzie Devrish as Pimp
- Natalie Blair as The Mystery Woman

== Production ==
The film was shot in Broadbeach, Queensland, in July 2008. Margot Robbie was cast in the lead after another actor had to pull out of the production. Christian Radford, another actor in the film and childhood friend, encouraged Robbie to audition since the film needed a female lead. After impressing the director with her performance during an audition, she won the lead without an agent at the time, eventually retaining one with the help of Aaron.
