= Treasure (disambiguation) =

A treasure is a concentration of riches.

Treasure may also refer to:

== Film and television ==
=== Film ===
- The Treasure (1923 film), a German film directed by G. W. Pabst
- The Treasure (2015 film), a Romanian film directed by Corneliu Porumboiu
- The Treasure (2017 film), a Hong Kong-Chinese film directed by Gordon Chan and Ronald Cheng
- Treasure (2024 German-French film), a tragicomedy film directed by Julia von Heinz
- Treasure (2024 Czech film), an adventure comedy film

=== Television ===
- Treasure (1958 TV series), an American program
- Treasure (animated TV series), a 2000–2001 British/Canadian cartoon programme
- Treasure HD (Canada), now HIFI, a Canadian English-language Category B specialty channel
- Treasure HD, an American digital cable specialty channel, part of the defunct Voom HD Networks
- "The Treasure" (The Amazing World of Gumball), a 2012 episode
- "The Treasure" (Dynasty), a 1985 episode

== Literature ==
- Treasure (Cussler novel), a 1988 novel by Clive Cussler
- Treasure (magazine), a British periodical for children
- Treasure: In Search of the Golden Horse, a 1984 puzzle/contest book by Dr. Crypton (Paul Hoffman)
- The Treasure (New Testament apocrypha) or Cave of Treasures, a book of the New Testament apocrypha
- The Treasure (novel), a 1904 novel by Selma Lagerlöf
- The Treasure (play) or The Gold Diggers, a play by Sholem Aleichem

== Music ==
=== Albums ===
- Treasure (Cocteau Twins album), 1984
- Treasure (Hayley Westenra album), 2007
- Treasure (Holly Cole album), 1998
- A Treasure, a 2011 album by Neil Young
- Treasure, an album by Charnett Moffett, 2010
- Treasures (Dolly Parton album), 1996
- Treasures, an album by Iona
- Treasures (Night Ark album), 2000
- Treasures (Tatsuro Yamashita album), 1995

=== Songs ===
- "Treasure" (song), a 2013 song by Bruno Mars
- "Treasure", by 38 Special from Bone Against Steel
- "Treasure", by Aldous Harding from Designer
- "Treasure", by Ateez from Treasure EP.1: All to Zero
- "Treasure", by the Brothers Johnson from Light Up the Night
- "Treasure", by Chapterhouse from Whirlpool
- "Treasure", by Choppersaurus, a project by Jake Shillingford of My Life Story
- "Treasure", by Flyleaf from Memento Mori
- "Treasure", by Meredith Andrews from The Invitation
- "Treasures", by Thievery Corporation from The Mirror Conspiracy

=== Bands ===
- Treasure (band), a South Korean boy band

== Other uses ==
- Treasure (surname)
- Treasure (company), a Japanese video game developer
- Treasure, codename of Nathalie Sergueiew (1912–1950), female double agent who worked for MI5 during World War II
- MV Treasure, several ships by the name
  - Treasure (tanker), a ship that spilled oil near Cape Town, South Africa, in 2000
- Treasure trove, in law, any discovered accumulation of valuables that can be presumed unowned or unclaimed
- Treasures Ministries, a Christian support group for women in the sex industry, founded by Harmony Dust

== See also ==
- Treasure Beach, a beach in Jamaica
- Treasure Coast, a region of Florida, U.S.
- Treasure County, Montana, U.S.
- Treasurer
- Treasury
- Tresor, underground techno nightclub and record label
- Trésor, a 2010 album by Kenza Farah
- TRESOR (TRESOR Runs Encryption Securely Outside RAM), a Linux kernel patch
