= Invite =

Invite may refer to:

- Invitation system, a method of encouraging people to join an organization
- The Invite, 2026 American sex comedy drama film
  - The Invite (soundtrack), the 2026 soundtrack to the film
