= Ben Browning (producer) =

British film and television producer

- Occupations: Film producer, film executive
- Years active: 2005–present
- Known for: Promising Young Woman, The Big Sick, Late Night

Ben Browning is a British film producer and film executive who has worked in film financing, production and development. He is known for producing films including Promising Young Woman, for which he received the Golden Globe, BAFTA and Academy Award nominations for Best Picture, as well as The Big Sick, Late Night, and Europa Report.

== Early life ==
Browning is British and grew up in different parts of the world.

== Career ==
In 2008, Browning co-founded the New York-based production company Wayfare Entertainment with Michael Maher. Maher later established Start Media, which operated several businesses, including movie theaters and a publishing company. Start Media subsequently absorbed Wayfare Entertainment and rebranded it as Start Motion Pictures, with Browning serving as its president. During his tenure, the company produced It's Kind of a Funny Story and Europa Report.

In August 2014, it was announced that Browning would leave his position as president of Start Motion Pictures. He continued to work with the company on Passengers, starring Keanu Reeves, as well as several other projects in development.

In September, Browning joined FilmNation Entertainment as president of production and acquisitions, relocating from New York to Los Angeles. He was tasked with scouting projects for the company to produce, sell and finance, and worked alongside co-president of production and acquisitions Aaron Ryder, with both executives reporting to FilmNation chief executive Glen Basner.

In March 2021, Browning was appointed head of film and television production at Archewell Productions, the production company founded by Prince Harry and Meghan Markle. He was recruited to oversee the couple's production activities under their multiyear deal with Netflix, which covered scripted and unscripted television series, documentaries, feature films and children's programming. During his tenure at Archewell, Browning oversaw production of the documentary series Harry & Meghan.

In March 2023, Browning returned to FilmNation Entertainment as president of production. His producing credits at the time included Promising Young Woman, while his earlier work in international film financing and production included projects such as Passengers and Room.

In December 2025, Browning was appointed co-chief executive officer of Pathé's United Kingdom operations and president of global film. He joined Faith Penhale, who was already serving as co-CEO of Pathé U.K., with the two tasked with expanding the company's film and television activities for global audiences. During Browning's tenure at FilmNation, the company produced films including Arrival, The Big Sick, Promising Young Woman, Conclave and Anora.

== Filmography ==
| Year | Title | Role | Notes |
|---|---|---|---|
| 2005–2007 | Masters of Horror | Producer / co-producer | TV series; 26 episodes |
| 2007 | Masters of Science Fiction | Co-producer | TV series; 6 episodes |
| 2008–2009 | Fear Itself | Producer | TV series; 11 episodes |
| 2009 | Ondine | Producer | |
| 2010 | It's Kind of a Funny Story | Producer | |
| 2011 | Sanctum | Executive producer | |
| 2012 | The History of Future Folk | Executive producer | |
| 2013 | Europa Report | Producer | |
| 2015 | Ratter | Producer | |
| 2016 | Miss Sloane | Producer | |
| 2016 | Passengers | Executive producer | |
| 2017 | The Big Sick | Executive producer | |
| 2017 | Gifted | Executive producer | |
| 2017 | The Sense of an Ending | Executive producer | |
| 2017 | Disobedience | Executive producer | |
| 2017 | The Children Act | Executive producer | |
| 2018 | Life Itself | Executive producer | |
| 2018 | Hold the Dark | Executive producer | |
| 2018 | Gloria Bell | Executive producer | |
| 2018 | The Nightingale | Executive producer | |
| 2019 | Late Night | Producer | |
| 2019 | The Lodge | Executive producer | |
| 2019 | The Personal History of David Copperfield | Executive producer | |
| 2020 | Promising Young Woman | Producer | |
| 2020 | The Courier | Producer | |
| 2020 | The Nest | Executive producer | |
| 2020 | I Know This Much Is True | Executive producer | TV miniseries; 6 episodes |
| 2021 | Red Rocket | Executive producer | |
| 2021 | Larry Flynt for President | Producer | |
| 2022 | The Outfit | Producer | |
| 2022 | Sharp Stick | Executive producer | |
| 2022 | Harry & Meghan | Executive producer | TV series; 6 episodes |
| 2022 | Live to Lead | Executive producer | TV series |
| 2022 | Archetypes | Executive producer | Podcast series; 1 episode |
| 2022 | The People We Hate at the Wedding | Executive producer | |
| 2023 | Down Low | Executive producer | |
| 2023 | Heart of Invictus | Executive producer | TV miniseries; 1 episode |
| 2024 | Conclave | Executive producer | |
| 2024 | Treasure | Executive producer | |
| 2026 | The Invite | Producer | |
