= The Roving Kind =

American television series

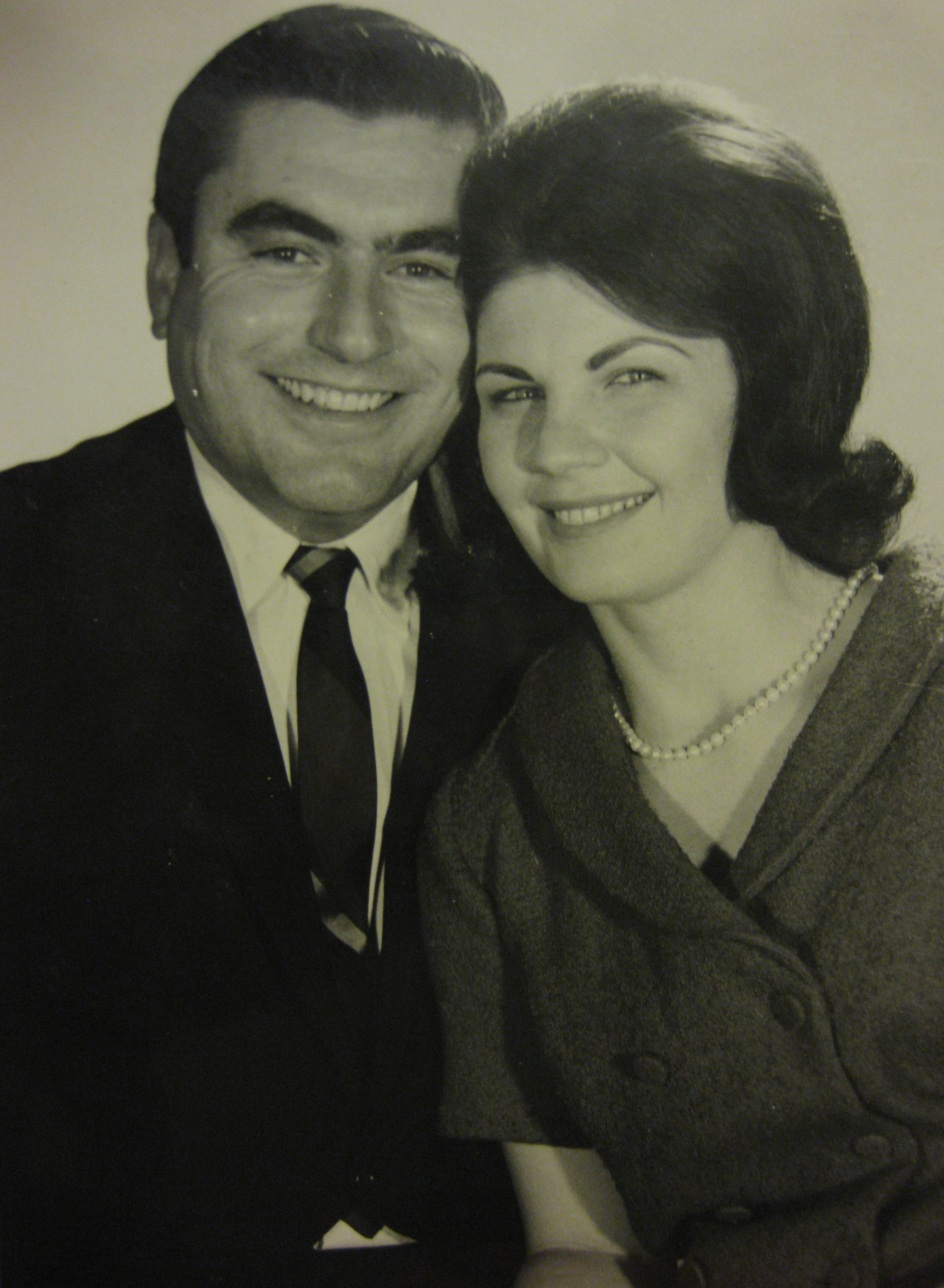
Co-producer Buddy Noonan with wife Ginger in Los Angeles, CA, 1964

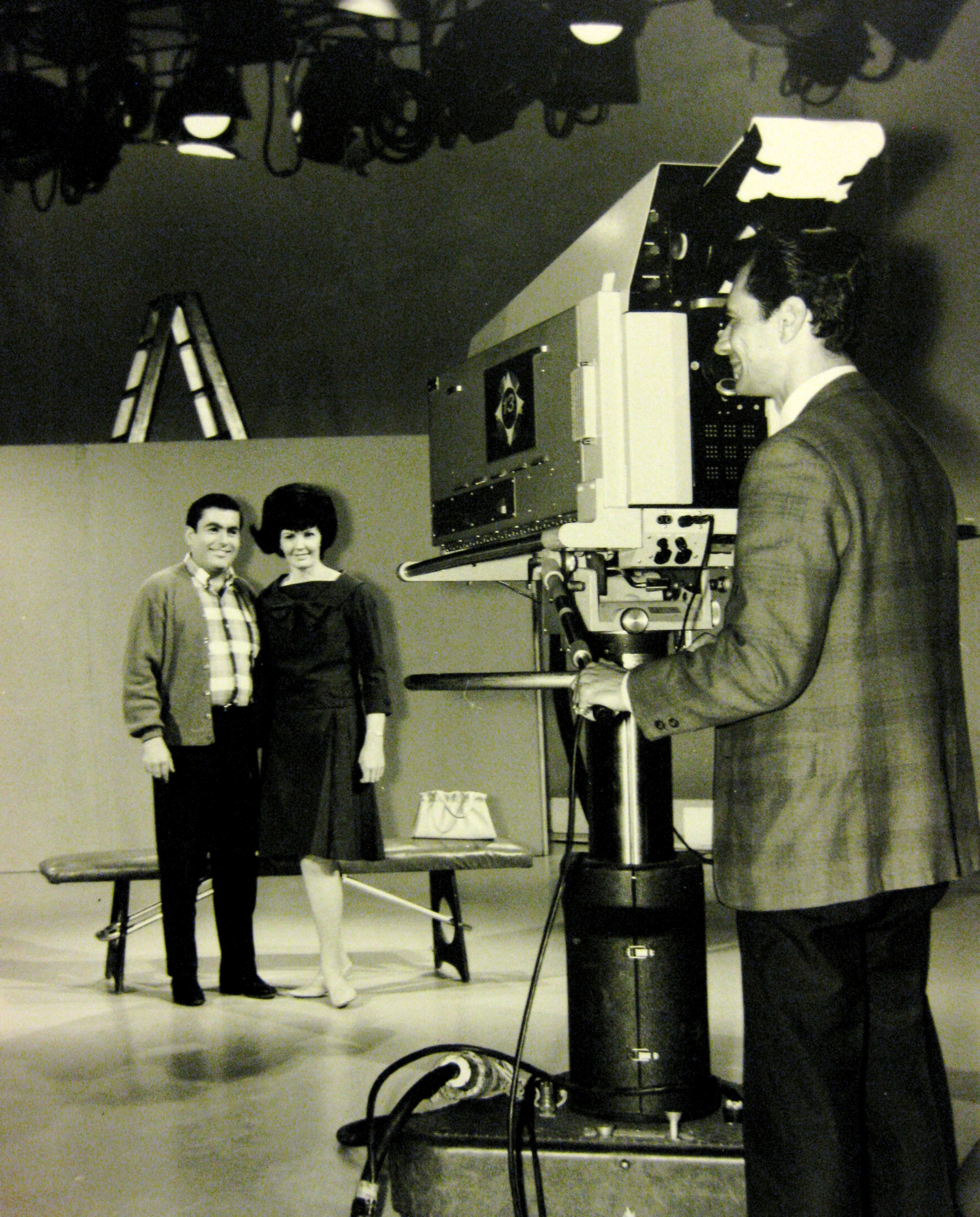
Buddy and Ginger Noonan on the set at KCOP-TV, Los Angeles, CA

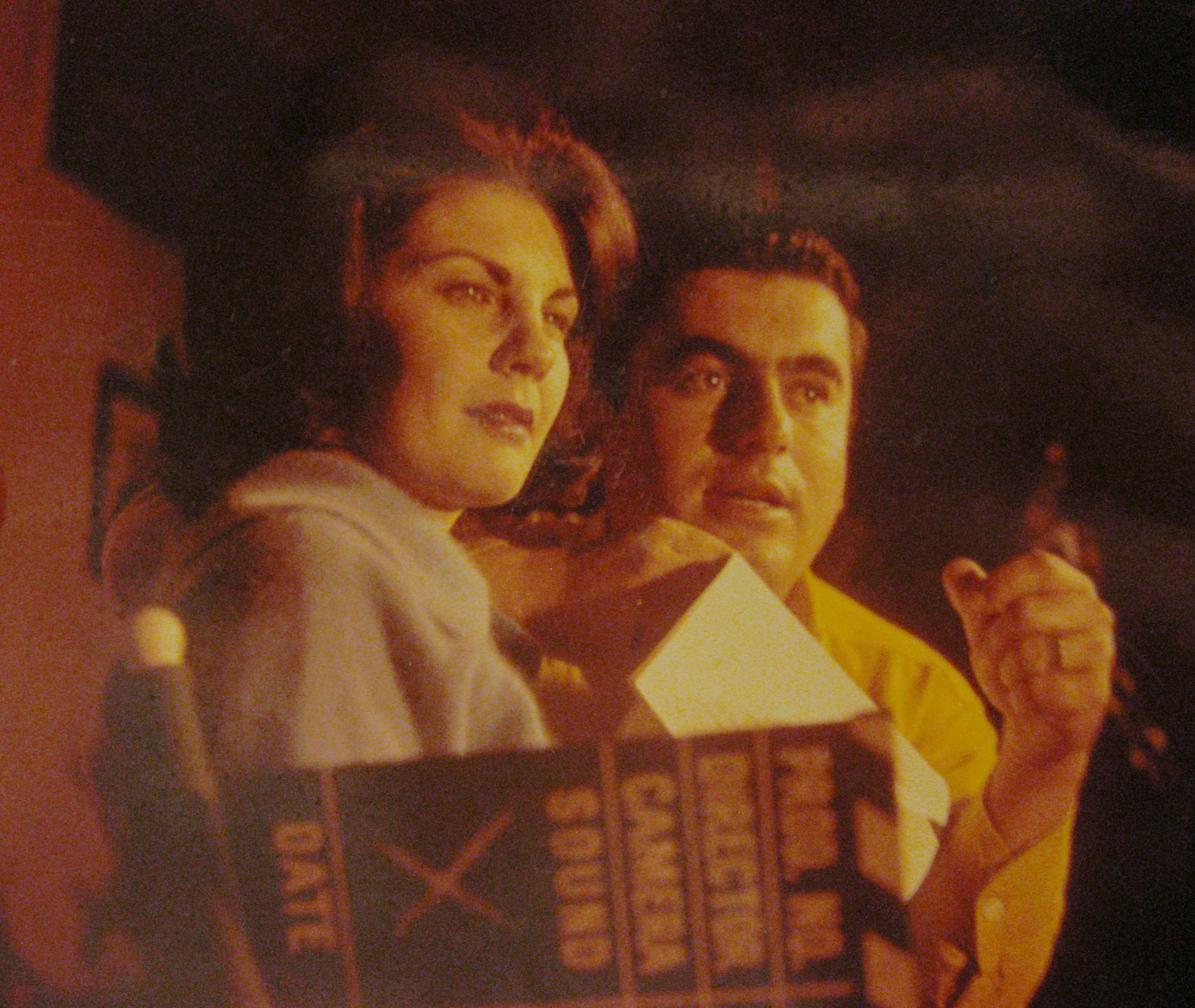
Buddy and Ginger on set, c. 1967

The Roving Kind was a nationally syndicated American television show distributed by Bill Burrud Productions, which aired on KCOP-TV, Los Angeles, from 1964 to 1968. The series made its debut on September 24, 1965. The show featured producers Milas Hinshaw and Buddy Noonan, who produced, filmed, and narrated the episodes.

The Roving Kind travel series was produced for a family audience, showing how families could travel on a budget. During filming, Buddy Noonan and his wife Ginger Noonan traveled with their children throughout the United States, including Hawaii, and also on location in Mexico. The series featured ghost towns, national monuments, state parks, tourist attractions, and state historical sites. The series was shot on 16 mm film.

== Cast members ==
The cast included Milas and Peggy Hinshaw, and Buddy and Ginger Noonan. Director David Dunn scored the show with Roger Miller's song, "King of the Road". Later, Miller went on to produce his own series and decided to use the song for in that.

== Episodes ==
Episodes, which ran from 1964 to 1966 and were re-run in syndication, include the following partial list (in order of date aired):

- "June Lake Winter Sports - Hot & Cold," color original, aired January 16, 1966
- "Lake Havasu City," aired December 4, 1966
- "Harbor Holiday," aired December 18, 1966 and December 22, 1966
- "World Championship Outboard Race" aired December 25, 1967
- "Nevada's Desert Playground," aired November 5, 1965 and January 10, 1967
- "Miracle of Ramona," aired April 8, 1966
- "The Legend of the Eagle Mountain Monster," aired April 15, 1966
- "Black Hills of Dakota," color original, aired May 27, 1966
- "California Gold Trails," aired June 3, 1966
- "Catalina Island," color original, aired June 10, 1966
- "Socialistic Ghost Town," aired January 15, 1967 and January 19, 1967
- "The Lost Wilderness," aired January 29, 1967
- "Arctic Dogsled Races," aired January 26, 1967
- "The Lost Fort" aired February 5, 1967
- "Hearst Castle" aired February 12, 1967 and February 16, 1967
- "Red Sails in the Sand-Set," aired March 9, 1967
- "California's Boating World" aired March 26, 1967
- "Blast-Off" aired April 30, 1967
- "The Perilous Road" aired June 4, 1967
- "I Think I Found a Gold Mine " aired June 11, 1967
- "Hawaii Vacation - Budget Style" aired December 3, 1967
- "Gold in Them Thar Hills" aired January 5, 1968
- "From Silver to White Gold" aired January 21, 1968 and January 25, 1968
- "June Lake Skiing" aired August 29, 1968
