= Buddy Noonan =

American journalist

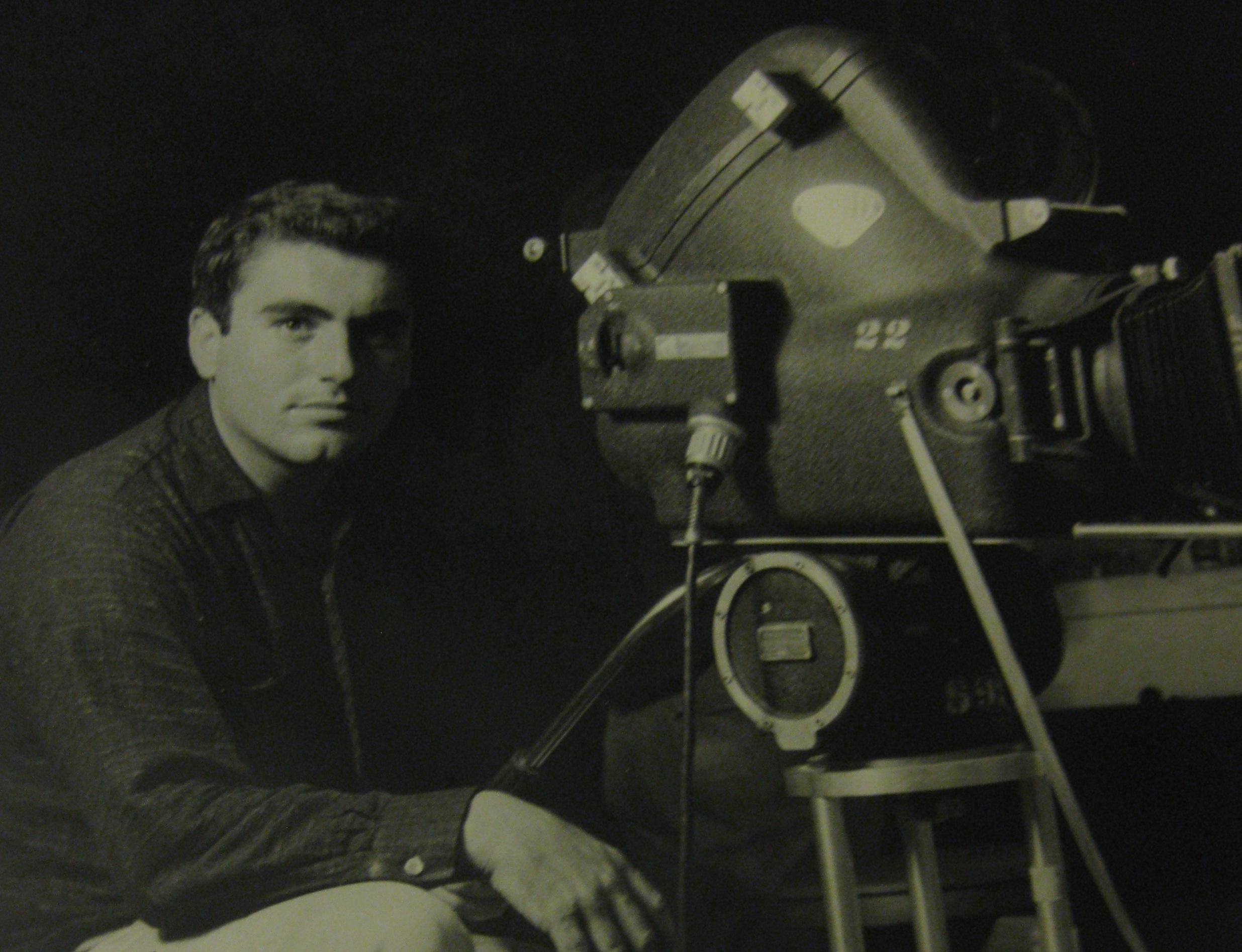
- Earl "Buddy" Noonan, cameraman, KCOP-TV studios, Los Angeles, CA
- Born: Earl Seely Noonan; April 9, 1937; Los Angeles, California
- Died: July 3, 1989 (aged 52); Los Angeles, California
- Occupations: Cinematographer, actor, entertainer, journalist, television producer

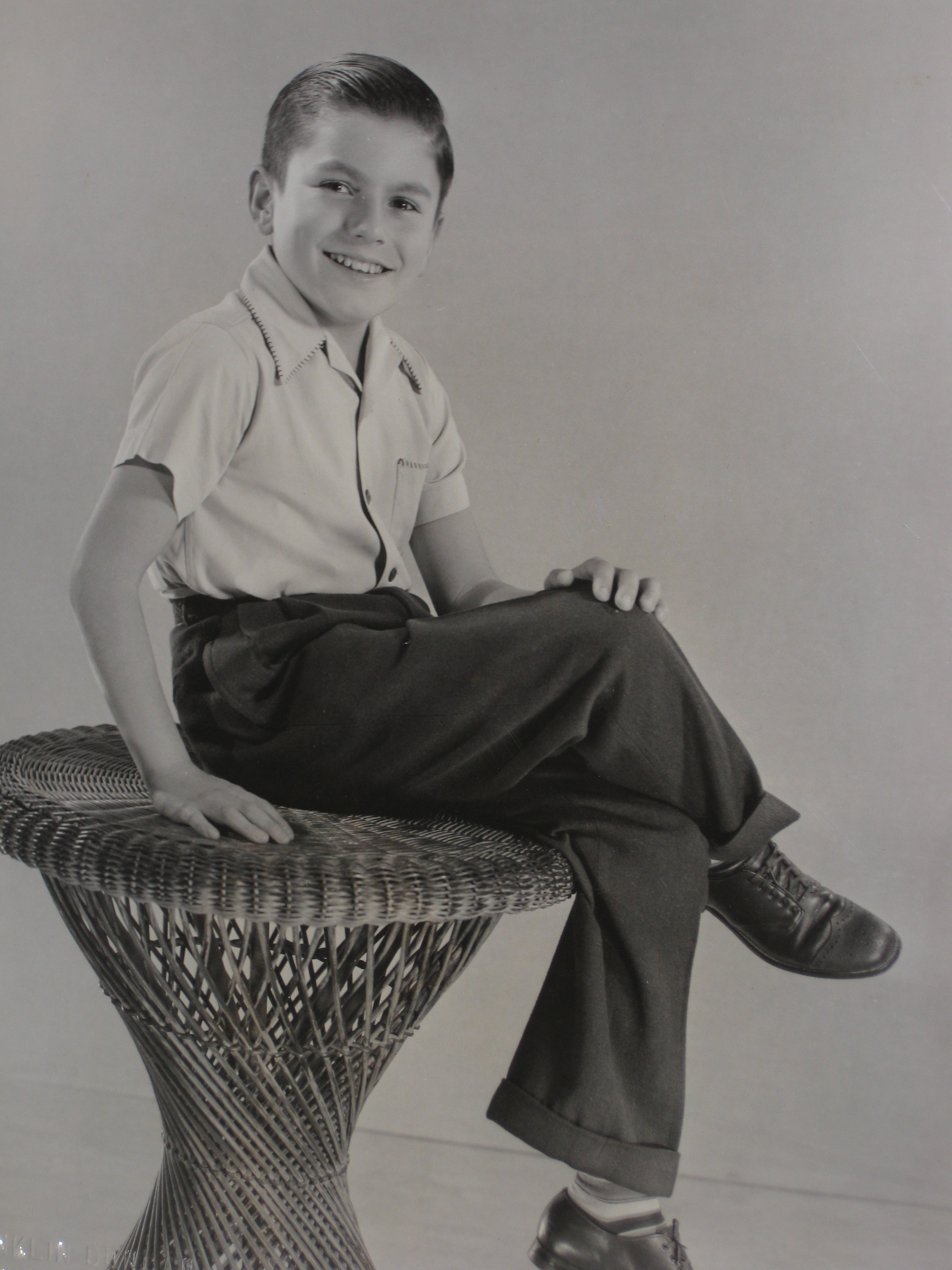
Promotional still, Los Angeles, CA

Buddy Noonan (April 9, 1937 – July 3, 1989), born Earl Seely Noonan in Glendale, California was an American cinematographer, actor, entertainer, and television producer for nationally syndicated television series such as The Happy Wanderers, Wanderlust, and The Roving Kind, shot on location throughout the United States and Mexico. These were distributed by Bill Burrud Productions and originally aired on KCOP-TV in Los Angeles. Noonan appeared in episodes of the Treasure series, later re-run on The Discovery Channel.

== Career ==
Noonan started his career by acting in The Bogus Green and the Oscar-nominated The Miracle of Our Lady of Fatima, in which he says, "Lucía, look! There's our lady on the church roof!" During this time, the family lived at 3034 Sagamore Way, Los Angeles 41, Calif., Cleveland 6–7483." A graduate of Eagle Rock High School, Noonan attended Glendale Community College. After his father Gustave "Gus" Noonan died of a heart attack when Buddy was 19, he started working for Bill Burrud Productions. Once the series ended, he relocated to Mammoth Lakes, California as a reporter for the Mammoth Lakes District Review and feature writer and columnist for The Mammoth Times with Managing Editor, owner/operator, columnist, and publisher Wally Hofmann. He later co-anchored the local news for Channel 5 with Marilyn Fisher.

One of Buddy's paternal uncles, Joe T. "Waano-Gano" Noonan, was a Cherokee artist who was active in the Native American community. Because of his uncle's influence, Buddy was invited to film the plight of the Klamath Tribes when fishing rights were still in dispute. His native heritage also influenced his work in several episodes of the "Treasure" series, where Buddy plays Native American Queho in Part 1 and Part 2 of "Queho's Secret Hideout" and also acting as himself in a "Treasure" episode with narrator Bill Burrud (1958) in "Queho's Secret Hideout." Queho was an outlaw who eluded authorities until his death. Noonan and his business partner Milas Hinshaw explored areas of the old West in the Treasure series. Buddy appeared in other episodes of the "Treasure (1958 TV series)" series with Bill Burrud, including "Death Valley's Stovepipe Wells."

Noonan's work was published in magazines throughout the Pacific southwest, including Desert Magazine and "The Review" in Mammoth Lakes, California. He wrote historical accounts of the Old West and on mining towns that had flourished during the Gold Rush, including Bodie Ghost Town. Noonan's foreword appears in "Murders at Convict Lake," an account of several escaped fugitives for which Convict Lake is named after.

Noonan's historical works are on display at the Mono County Historical Society near Bodie State Historical Park in Bridgeport, California. His photographic slides of the southwest are on display at the Henry F. Hauser Museum, and at the Geology Department of Cochise College in Sierra Vista, Arizona. In the 1980s, Noonan was floor director for the Trinity Broadcasting Network.

== Death ==
Noonan died of cancer at Glendale Adventist Medical Center in Glendale, California. He is buried in the same row as his mother Florence Noonan Martin (née Seely) and father Vincent Gustave ("Gus" aka "Sparky") Noonan at Valhalla Memorial Park Cemetery in North Hollywood, CA.

== Publications ==
- Railroad in the Sky, by Buddy Noonan
- Camp Rucker, the Army's Forgotten Outpost, by Buddy Noonan
- Bill Holcomb's Valley, by Buddy Noonan
