= Queho =

Purported mass murderer

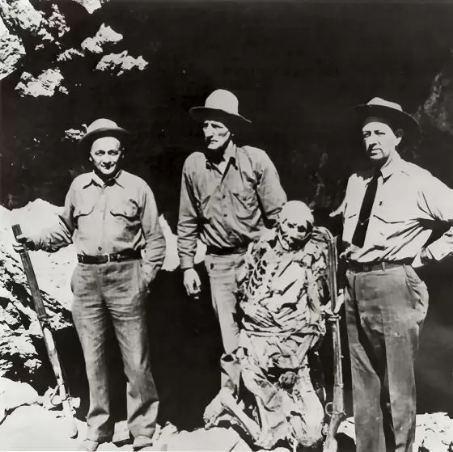
- Queho's corpse discovered by Charley Kenyon, along with brothers Art and Ed Schroeder, near Emerald Lake in 1940
- Born: c. 1880
- Died: c. 1930s
- Body discovered: 1940

Details
- Victims: 13 confirmed, 23 alleged
- State: Nevada

Queho (born around 1880; his name was also spelled Quehoe on his grave or Quejo in other sources) was a Native American outlaw and renegade whose exploits became part of Nevada legend. Many deaths were blamed on Queho, and so he earned the title of being the first mass murderer in the state of Nevada and "The Mad Indian".

== Biography ==
Queho was an outcast, being called a "half-breed" in the days when being half Native American was not accepted. Queho's mother was from the Cocopah tribe. Queho was speculated to be partially Mexican, his mother died shortly after birth.

Queho took odd jobs around El Dorado Canyon. He is said to have killed his half-brother and a 100-year-old blind Indian known to Queho as Canyon Charlie. Queho had a clubfoot, which left a distinctive impression when he was being trailed. He is alleged to have eluded posses and killed for food and supplies. Some say the fugitive Queho was not responsible for all of the murders that took place around the time period he lived. Others say he was a cold-blooded killer who would do anything to stay alive and survive. Queho was blamed for the death of Maude ("Daisy") J. Douglas after a search outside the cabin at the Techatticup Mine in Nelson, Nevada. Settlers said Queho cursed the land. They called it "The Curse of Queho". In March 1919, the reward for capturing Queho "dead or alive" increased from an initial bounty of $1,000 to $3,000. In 1921, Queho was reported to have been sighted near the Colorado River.

In 1940, prospectors working near the Colorado River discovered a cave containing the mummified remains of the Nevada desperado. His body was discovered with blasting caps and dynamite that could only have come from the building of Boulder Dam, indicating he was alive at least until the early 1930s. His remains were buried only after being purchased by Queho's old nemesis, Frank Wait, a law officer, before being given to the Las Vegas Elks Club, who exhibited the remains at Helldorado Days. District attorney Roland Wiley secured the remains and gave Queho a proper burial at Cathedral Canyon, Nevada.

== Media portrayals ==
Queho was portrayed by actor Buddy Noonan in Bill Burrud's Treasure in Parts 1 and 2 of "Queho's Secret Hideout", which aired in 1958.

== See also ==
- List of homicides in Nevada
