= Waáno-Gano =

American artist

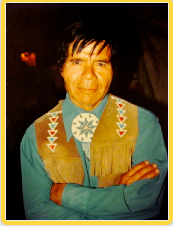
- Joseph "Waáno-Gano" Noonan
- Born: Joseph Noonan; March 3, 1906; Salt Lake City, Utah, U.S.
- Died: September 1, 1982 (aged 76); Los Angeles, California, U.S.
- Known for: Painting, landscape painting, murals.
- Website: picasaweb.google.com

Joseph Theodore "Waáno-Gano" ("Joe") Noonan of the San Fernando Valley Professional Artists' Guild was an artist born on March 3, 1906, in Salt Lake City, Utah.

== Background ==
Joseph Noonan's parents were Irene May Noonan (1876–1960), whom the artist called Rena May Lash-Heart, and James A. Noonan, both of Cherokee descent. The couple married in 1891 and four children, three of whom survived past infancy. James died around 1900. Irene was born in Arkansas in May 1876 and died in California in 1960.

== Family ==
He married Christine "Nunny" Ruben, a member of the Karuk tribe, on 15 March 1935. One of Waáno-Gano's nephews was television producer Buddy Noonan.

== Education ==
After studying at the Los Angeles Academy of Fine Arts and the Christian von Schneidau Art School in the 1920s, Waáno-Gano eventually settled in Los Angeles as a landscape painter in pastel and oil.

== Name ==
The Amerindian name Waáno-Gano comes from waáno meaning "bow" and gano meaning "arrow" in the Iroquois language, Seneca dialect.

== Art ==
He specialized in native American scenes and California landscapes. His work has been in the collections of Sherman Indian Museum Western Airlines offices, and Gardena High School. He exhibited throughout the 1930s and 1940s at the California Art Club, San Fernando Valley Art Club, Los Angeles Museum of Art, Los Angeles City Hall, and in Chicago. He also lectured on Indian life, designed Indian motifs for textiles, and painted murals in Rapid City, South Dakota, and San Francisco, California.

The designer of the Indian Achievement Medal, Waáno-Gano served during World War II in the US Air Force. He held more than 118 one-man shows and painted 27 murals, including a 6 x 16 foot mural for New Western Air Lines, which was presented on September 1, 1944, at 287 Geary Street, San Francisco, California, depicting native American Indian life and holding art exhibitions. Waáno-Gano created the design for the Will Rogers Memorial and designed murals for both the Los Angeles Library before it was burned by arson and for Los Angeles County General.

Waáno-Gano lectured on native Indian life and wrote on the art of the American Indian. Along with his wife, Waáno-Gano was highly involved in the Bureau of Indian Affairs. Both were also active in the Native American art community and participated in ceremonial dances. A few of Waáno-Gano's honors included the Baltimore Annual, Hermosa Beach, CA Best Picture to Live With Award (1952), CCP Hall of Fame, (Indian Section), California International Flower Show Art Exhibition (Chairman 1958), and Honor Roll of the Greatest Living Indians (1933).

== Death ==
Waáno-Gano was a resident of Los Angeles until his death on September 1, 1982 in Los Angeles, California.
