= The Man in Blue (1937 film) =

1937 film

- Theatrical release poster
- Directed by: Milton Carruth
- Screenplay by: Lester Cole
- Story by: Kubec Glasmon
- Produced by: Kubec Glasmon
- Starring: Robert Wilcox; Edward Ellis; Nan Grey; Richard Carle; Ralph Morgan; Alma Kruger; Bill Burrud
- Cinematography: George Robinson
- Edited by: Paul Landres
- Production company: Universal Pictures
- Distributed by: Universal Pictures
- Release date: May 30, 1937
- Running time: 67 minutes
- Country: United States
- Language: English

The Man in Blue is a 1937 American drama film directed by Milton Carruth and written by Lester Cole. The film stars Robert Wilcox, Edward Ellis, Nan Grey, Richard Carle, Ralph Morgan, Alma Kruger, and Bill Burrud. The film was released on May 30, 1937, by Universal Pictures.

== Plot ==
When Officer Martin Dunne was ambushed and shot at, he shoots back in self defense and kills Willie Loomis, who the father of Frankie Loomis. Now, Dunne and his wife decide to raise Frankie, who does not know that his foster father killed his real father.

== Cast ==
- Robert Wilcox as Frankie Dunne
- Edward Ellis as Martin Dunne
- Nan Grey as June Hanson
- Richard Carle as Willie Loomis
- Ralph Morgan as The 'Professor'
- Alma Kruger as Mrs. Dunne
- Bill Burrud as Frankie as a Boy
- Aggie Herring as Aggie
- Frederick Burton as Parke Lewis
- Herbert Corthell as Patrolman Pat Casey
- Selmer Jackson as District Attorney
- Milburn Stone as Henchman 'Dutch'
