= The Happy Wanderers =

The Happy Wanderers was a nationally syndicated travelogue television show that originally aired on KTLA, Channel 5 in Los Angeles, California in the 1960s. The weekly program featured travel destinations, tips, expenses, and highlights. The series was originally produced by Barry Weinstein, David Eisenlohr and Charles Sutton, narrated by Stan Bohrman, which featured Slim Barnard and Henrietta Barnard. Co-hosts included Milas Hinshaw and Buddy Noonan, who was executive producer. The Happy Wanderer theme song by Friedrich W. Moller, with lyrics by Antonia Ridge, was scored by David Dunn Productions of Hollywood, CA. Sponsored by local area Ford dealers, the show received an ARB and Nielsen rating of 15 as of June 2, 1965, making that series the most popular local television show in Southern California. Television personality Huell Howser later featured Slim and Henrietta Barnard on his show, Visiting with Huell Howser.

== Cast ==
The cast included Slim and Henrietta Barnard, Buddy Noonan, and Milas Hinshaw, who was the cinematographer for Mystery Mansion and went on to produce the TV adaptation for Valley of the Dolls and other films. Director David Dunn scored the show's theme song. His wife Barbra Dunn (formerly "Miss Barbra" Balay of Romper Room) appeared with him in at least one episode.
