= The Invite (soundtrack) =

2026 film soundtrack album

The Invite (Original Soundtrack)

Film score by Devonté Hynes
- Released: June 26, 2026
- Recorded: 2025–2026
- Genre: Film score
- Length: 24:01
- Label: A24 Music
- Producer: Devonté Hynes

Devonté Hynes chronology
Master Gardener (2023)	The Invite (2026)

The Invite (Original Soundtrack) is the film score to the 2026 film The Invite directed by Olivia Wilde who also starred alongside Seth Rogen, Penélope Cruz and Edward Norton. The original score is composed by Devonté Hynes and released through A24 Music on June 26, 2026.

== Background ==
Devonté Hynes scored the music for The Invite. Devonté watched the first 10 minutes of the film, which Olivia shown him and the latter discussed to him on how the whole film takes place in a single apartment with just four characters, which made Devonté to think about assuming it as a play in a theatre that opened a lot of possibilities on how the score would be developed. With Devonté's assumption of a theatre play, he insisted that the music should be played live in a way that it is having a conversation with the real actors who are having these real dialogues with each other, as a "dialogue-heavy film".

Devonté being a cellist, considered the cello to be an "instrument that actually can be in dialogue" which can be played in several moods and tones, depending on the situation. When he discussed about using cellos to Olivia, and the theatre choices, she was eventually amused by it considering the numerous possibilities. Devonté considered the score to be an anonymous character and a "ghostly figure" observing the incidents happening at the dining table. With the film not having any central characters, it was also likeable for Devonté as different people can relate to the different characters, making the score an extra guest in the dining room.

Devonté considered the music to be an aspect in choreographing all the incidents happening in the dining room. His interest in contemporary dance and ballet music, provided a connection with the four characters, the music and performance of the cello and the writing of the cues, and the nuances accompanied to the ballet dance form which was choreographic in nature, besides the dialogue driven aspect of using cello. He considered the music and dialogues being interwoven whether it was spontaneous or being repetitive or in a certain pattern. Besides the cello, Devonté also accompanied the Greek choir to compliment the dialogue-driven narrative.

== Release ==
The soundtrack was announced on June 15, 2026, and was preceded by the lead single "Contentious Environment". The album was released through A24 Music on June 26. Besides its digital release, the album was also made available through physical LPs.

== Reception ==
Kate Erbland of IndieWire described it a "nerve-shredding" score, a "tense offering". Matt Zoller Seitz of RogerEbert.com wrote "Devonté Hynes, of Lightspeed Champion and Blood Orange, applies the same overkill to his string-driven score, which grabs onto the dominant feeling of a scene and amplifies it until additional emotional shadings are drowned out. One comically tense dialogue scene is scored with flurries of jabbing, screeching strings, like in a horror movie." Justin Chang of The New Yorker wrote "the score, by Dev Hynes, is so awash in ominously thrumming cello strings you might wonder if the term "chamber piece" has been taken literally."

Odie Henderson of The Boston Globe called it an "intrusive score". Kimberley Jones of The Austin Chronicle wrote "Devonté Hynes (aka Blood Orange) sets the playfully-knives-out tone perfectly." Phil de Semiyen of Time Out wrote "the score, by Devonté Hynes, aka Blood Orange, scuttles through your brain like a spider in the bathtub." Taylor Williams of Slant Magazine called it a "prickly score". Donald Clarke of The Irish Times wrote "Devonté Hynes' overly insistent score – later to calm down – would surely give the game away." Gregory Nussen of Screen Rant called it a "wrenching string score".

== Track listing ==
The Invite (Original Soundtrack)
No.	Title	Length
1.	"Through the Window"	0:22
2.	"Contentious Environment"	3:05
3.	"Suite for Cello I"	0:36
4.	"We're Doing This"	0:30
5.	"Hawk in Bathroom"	0:13
6.	"They're On Their Way"	0:10
7.	"Flan"	0:12
8.	"Sex Parties"	0:36
9.	"Arguments"	1:23
10.	"Explain Yourself + Our Neighbours"	2:11
11.	"Palladio I. Allegretto"	0:35
12.	"Can We Please Do a Reset"	0:26
13.	"Window"	0:10
14.	"Tequila"	0:57
15.	"Carmen Suite No. 2 – II. Habanera"	3:56
16.	"A Little Example"	0:35
17.	"The Band"	0:30
18.	"Not Heard Anything"	0:21
19.	"Suite for Cello II"	2:16
20.	"Unapologetic"	0:11
21.	"Hawk's Story"	1:34
22.	"You Do Have Sex, Right?"	0:10
23.	"I Don't Eat Meat"	0:29
24.	"Sorry"	0:15
25.	"Suite for Cello III"	1:16
26.	"It's Over / Suite for Cello"	1:52
Total length:		24:01

== Accolades ==
Award	Date of ceremony	Category	Nominee(s)	Result	Ref.
Hollywood Music in Media Awards	November 18, 2026	Best Original Score – Independent Film	Devonté Hynes	Pending	
