= Fair Warning (1937 film) =

1937 film by Norman Foster

Fair Warning Death in Paradise Canyon
- Theatrical release poster
- Directed by: Norman Foster
- Screenplay by: Norman Foster
- Produced by: Sol M. Wurtzel
- Starring: J. Edward Bromberg; Betty Furness; John Payne; Victor Kilian; Bill Burrud; Gavin Muir
- Cinematography: Sidney Wagner
- Edited by: Louis R. Loeffler
- Production company: 20th Century Fox
- Distributed by: 20th Century Fox
- Release date: March 5, 1937
- Running time: 70 minutes
- Country: United States
- Language: English

Fair Warning is a 1937 American mystery film written and directed by Norman Foster. The film stars J. Edward Bromberg, Betty Furness, John Payne, Victor Kilian, Bill Burrud and Gavin Muir. The film was released on March 5, 1937, by 20th Century Fox.

== Plot ==
In California's Death Valley a chemistry whiz-kid helps a sheriff track the man who murdered a wealthy mine owner who had been staying at a fancy winter resort.

== Cast ==
- J. Edward Bromberg as Matthew Jericho
- Betty Furness as Kay Farnham
- John Payne as Jim Preston
- Victor Kilian as Sam
- Bill Burrud as Malcolm Berkhardt
- Gavin Muir as Herbert Willett
- Gloria Roy as Grace Hamilton
- Andrew Tombes as J.C. Farnham
- Ivan Lebedeff as Count Andre Lukacha
- John Eldredge as Dr. Galt
- Julius Tannen as Mr. Taylor
- Paul McVey as Mr. Berkhardt
- Lelah Tyler as Mrs. Berkhardt
- Lydia Knott as Miss Willoughby
