= Treasure (surname) =

Treasure is a surname. Notable people with the surname include:

- Cyril Treasure (1896–1985), English footballer
- Darren Treasure, American sport consultant
- David Treasure, Welsh rugby league player
- David Treasure (politician) (1943–2018), Australian politician
- Frank Treasure (1925–1998), Australian rules footballer
- Rachael Treasure (born 1968), Australian journalist and writer
- Sisely Treasure, American singer and dancer
- Ferdinand Treasure, (born 1939 Jamaican businessman
