= Three Kids and a Queen =

1935 film by Edward Ludwig

- Theatrical release poster
- Directed by: Edward Ludwig
- Screenplay by: Samuel Ornitz; Barry Trivers
- Story by: Chester Beecroft; Mary Marlind; Harry Poppe
- Produced by: Ben Verschleiser
- Starring: May Robson; Henry Armetta; Herman Bing; Frankie Darro; Bill Burrud; William "Billy" Benedict
- Cinematography: George Robinson
- Edited by: Byron Robinson
- Music by: Heinz Roemheld; Franz Waxman
- Production company: Universal Pictures
- Distributed by: Universal Pictures
- Release date: October 21, 1935
- Running time: 90 minutes
- Country: United States
- Language: English

Three Kids and a Queen is a 1935 American drama film directed by Edward Ludwig, written by Samuel Ornitz and Barry Trivers, and starring May Robson, Henry Armetta, Herman Bing, Frankie Darro, Bill Burrud and William "Billy" Benedict. It was released on October 21, 1935, by Universal Pictures.

== Cast ==
- May Robson as Mary Jane 'Queenie' Baxter
- Henry Armetta as Tony Orsatti
- Herman Bing as Walter Merkin
- Frankie Darro as Blackie
- Bill Burrud as Doc
- William "Billy" Benedict as Flash
- Lawrence Grant as Wilfred Edgar
- Charlotte Henry as Julia Orsatti
- Lillian Harmer as Elmira Wiggins
- Henry Kolker as Crippets
- John Miljan as Boss Benton
- Hale Hamilton as Ralph
- Noel Madison as Stanley
- Tom Dugan as Bill
- Irving Pichel as Kraft
- Hedda Hopper as Mrs. Cummings
- Ferdinand Gottschalk as Dr. Flesig
- Edward Van Sloan as Dr. Gordon
- Louis Vincenot as Dr. Charcot
- Arnold Korff as Dr. Winters
- Adrian Morris as Federal Man

== Critical reception ==
Motion Picture Herald stated the film was "semi-topical in nature, dealing with a news event of a year or two ago", but was "aimed solely at provoking laughter" even to the point of depicting serious events such as an attempted kidnapping from a comedic viewpoint. May Robson was praised for her characterisation, which was described as "deftly portrayed ... with no end of idiosyncrasies."
