= Promising Young Woman =

2020 film by Emerald Fennell

- Theatrical release poster
- Directed by: Emerald Fennell
- Written by: Emerald Fennell
- Produced by: Margot Robbie; Josey McNamara; Tom Ackerley; Ben Browning; Ashley Fox; Emerald Fennell
- Starring: Carey Mulligan; Bo Burnham; Alison Brie; Clancy Brown; Chris Lowell; Jennifer Coolidge; Laverne Cox; Connie Britton; Molly Shannon
- Cinematography: Benjamin Kračun
- Edited by: Frédéric Thoraval
- Music by: Anthony Willis
- Production companies: FilmNation Entertainment; LuckyChap Entertainment
- Distributed by: Focus Features (United States); Universal Pictures (select territories); Sky Cinema; Now (United Kingdom) (Note: The film skipped a theatrical release in the United Kingdom and Ireland as a result of the closure of cinemas in April due to the COVID-19 pandemic. Instead, through a partnership between sister companies Focus Features, Universal Pictures and Sky, the film was made available on April 16, 2021, on Sky's services Sky Cinema and Now as a Sky Original.)
- Release dates: January 25, 2020 (Sundance); December 25, 2020 (United States)
- Running time: 114 minutes
- Countries: United States; United Kingdom
- Language: English
- Budget: $10 million
- Box office: $18.9 million

Promising Young Woman is a 2020 thriller film written, directed, and co-produced by Emerald Fennell in her feature directorial debut. It stars Carey Mulligan as a woman who fakes intoxication to entrap men who rape drunk women. Bo Burnham, Alison Brie, Clancy Brown, Chris Lowell, Jennifer Coolidge, Laverne Cox, and Connie Britton feature in supporting roles. It incorporates the film genres black comedy, crime drama, feminist film, rape and revenge, and vigilante thriller.

Promising Young Woman had its world premiere at the Sundance Film Festival on January 25, 2020, and was theatrically released in North America on December 25, 2020, by Focus Features. It received positive reviews from critics, with particular praise given to Mulligan's performance and to Fennell's direction and screenplay, and it grossed $18 million worldwide. The film won Best Original Screenplay at the 93rd Academy Awards, with additional nominations for Best Picture, Best Director, Best Actress (Mulligan), and Best Film Editing. Fennell also won Best Original Screenplay at the Critics' Choice Awards, Writers' Guild Awards, and British Academy Film Awards. The Writers Guild of America ranked the film's screenplay the 23rd greatest of the 21st century.

== Plot ==
Thirty-year-old medical school drop-out Cassandra "Cassie" Thomas lives with her parents and works in a coffee shop. Cassie abandoned her studies to take care of her best friend, Nina Fisher, who, when drunk one night, was raped by their classmate Al Monroe while others watched and did nothing to help her. Nina dropped out of medical school and later committed suicide.

Wracked with guilt for not having been there to protect Nina the night of the rape, Cassie dedicates herself to punishing men who take advantage of drunk women. At night, she visits bars pretending to be intoxicated, entrapping men into taking her home in the hope of having sex with her before she reveals she is sober and confronts them menacingly.

Despite some hesitation, Cassie starts dating Ryan Cooper, a former classmate who is now a pediatric surgeon, although she insists on taking it slow. She is beginning to feel happy again when Ryan mentions that Al is soon to be married and her anger resurfaces; she begins enacting a series of revenge plans and also begins picking up strange men once again. Ryan breaks up with her when he sees her exiting a bar with a man she has tricked into thinking she is drunk.

Cassie tracks down Madison McPhee, a former friend who dismissed Nina's story and blamed Nina for what happened to her; she invites Madison to lunch, gets her drunk, and arranges for a man to take her to a hotel room. The next day, Madison sends Cassie frantic voicemails, concerned that she may have been assaulted.

Cassie confronts Elizabeth Walker, the school dean who dismissed Nina's complaint on the ground of insufficient evidence. Cassie tricks Walker's daughter Amber into going to a diner, then tells Walker she has taken Amber to the same dorm room where Nina was attacked and left her with the men there. After a frantic Walker becomes contrite, Cassie tells her Amber is safe.

Cassie visits Jordan Green, Al's former defense attorney, intending to punish him for bullying Nina into dropping her case. Instead, she finds him guilt-ridden and remorseful and, moved by his sincerity, forgives him.

Cassie visits Nina's mother, who convinces her to stop her pursuit of vengeance. She manages to resume her relationship with Ryan, which becomes more serious; she introduces him to her parents. One day, Madison visits Cassie, distraught, and she tells Madison the man at the hotel did not assault her; before leaving, Madison gives her an old phone containing a video of Nina's assault. On watching the video, Cassie learns that Ryan was at the party and watched the rape; she angrily confronts him and threatens to release the video to his parents and his colleagues unless he reveals the location of Al's upcoming bachelor party. Ryan gives it to her and begs her to forgive him, but she refuses.

Cassie disguises herself as a stripper and arrives at the remote cabin where the party is being held. After drugging Al's friends, she handcuffs him to a bed and reveals her identity. She tells Al she is going to carve Nina's name into his body with a scalpel, but as she is about to start, he works one of his hands free and overpowers her, then suffocates her with a pillow. The next morning, his friend Joe helps him burn Cassie's body in the woods.

Cassie's parents report her missing, and the police begin investigating. Green receives a package from Cassie containing the video of the rape and the location of the bachelor party along with a request that he deliver the package to the police should she disappear. The police find Cassie's ashes and arrest Al at his wedding. Ryan receives a series of scheduled messages from Cassie, which confirm that her plan for justice is complete.

== Cast ==
- Carey Mulligan as Cassandra "Cassie" Thomas
- Bo Burnham as Ryan Cooper
- Alison Brie as Madison McPhee
- Clancy Brown as Stanley
- Jennifer Coolidge as Susan
- Laverne Cox as Gail
- Chris Lowell as Al Monroe
- Molly Shannon as Mrs. Fisher
- Connie Britton as Dean Elizabeth Walker
- Adam Brody as Jerry
- Max Greenfield as Joe
- Ray Nicholson as Jim
- Christopher Mintz-Plasse as Neil
- Steve Monroe as Lincoln
- Sam Richardson as Paul

In addition, Alfred Molina appears, uncredited, as lawyer Jordan Green.

== Production ==
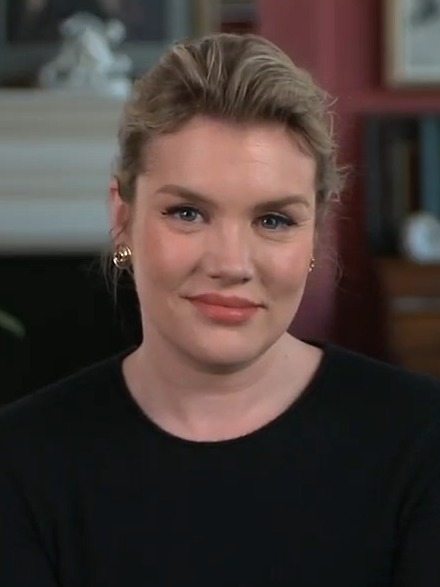
Writer and director Emerald Fennell

Emerald Fennell devised the concept of the film in 2017, and sold the script to Margot Robbie's production company LuckyChap Entertainment after pitching the opening scene. The script then appeared on the 2018 "Black List" of the most-liked unproduced screenplays. In January 2019, it was announced Carey Mulligan had been set to star in the film, with Fennell directing. In March 2019, Bo Burnham, Alison Brie, Connie Britton, Adam Brody, Jennifer Coolidge, Laverne Cox, Max Greenfield, Christopher Mintz-Plasse, Sam Richardson, and Molly Shannon joined the cast, with Angela Zhou and Clancy Brown being added in April. Principal photography began in Los Angeles on March 26, 2019, lasting 23 days. The majority of exterior shots were filmed at Campus South, part of the Lanterman property at Cal Poly Pomona.

The film production crew deliberately chose male actors who previously played characters known as good or wholesome to reinforce the idea that predators can be anyone. Fennell created "mood boards" to illustrate to the crew how Cassie has wildly different facets of her personality.

In the first draft of the script, Fennell planned to end the film at the time Cassie's body was burned, but the production's financiers balked at having a negative ending. Prior to writing the script, Fennell initially considered an ending where Cassie appears at the wedding and kills the men responsible, but she deemed it unrealistic. She decided to have the ending where Cassie has a backup revenge plan as she felt Cassie would be thorough in her planning and she would be aware she could die. Additionally, Fennell stated that having Al apprehended at his wedding would reflect Cassie's sense of humor. The production had a budget around $10 million.

== Release ==
In February 2019, Focus Features acquired distribution rights to the film for the world excluding Australia, New Zealand, the Benelux, Israel, Greece, Middle East, the CIS, and South Africa. It had its world premiere at the Sundance Film Festival on January 25, 2020. It was initially scheduled to be released theatrically on April 17, 2020, but was pulled from the schedule due to the initial closures of movie theaters that occurred during the COVID-19 pandemic. It was theatrically released on December 25, 2020, instead, and on video on demand on January 15, 2021. The Blu-ray was released on March 16, 2021.

== Reception ==
=== Box office ===
Promising Young Woman grossed $6.5 million in the United States and Canada, and $12.4 million in other territories, for a worldwide total of $18.9 million. Domestically, the film was released alongside Wonder Woman 1984, News of the World, and Pinocchio, and was projected to gross around $2 million in its opening weekend. It went on to debut to $719,305, finishing fifth at the box office. Some 63% of the audience were female, and 74% were aged over 25. The film dropped 4.4% in its second weekend to $687,900, then made $586,285 in its third weekend, finishing sixth both times. The film continued to hold well in the subsequent weekends, including seeing a 16% bump following its four Golden Globe nominations, with a running total of $5.1 million by February 21.

=== Critical response ===
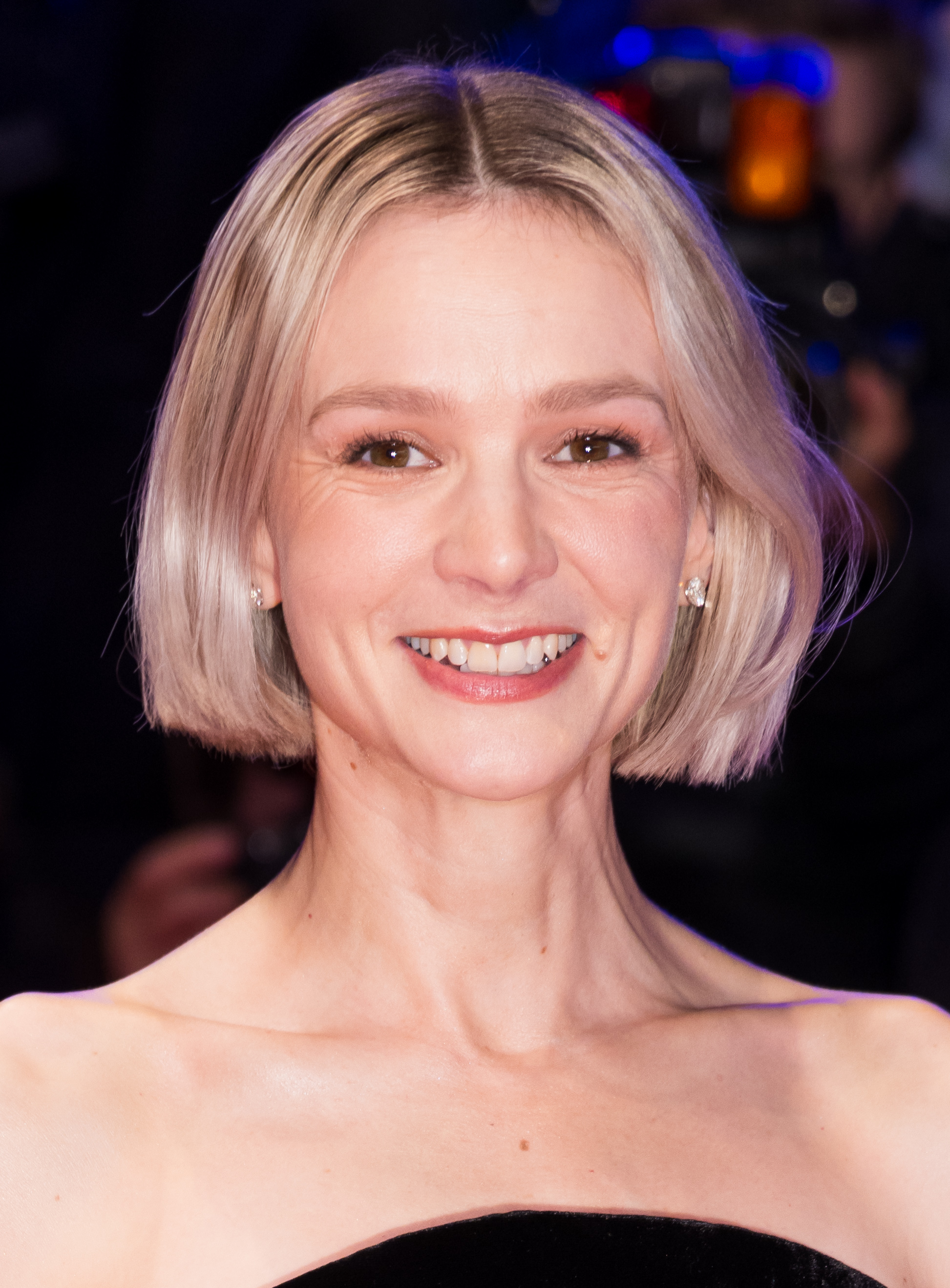
Carey Mulligan received critical acclaim for her performance, earning an Academy Award for Best Actress nomination.

Promising Young Woman received positive reviews from critics. On the review aggregator Rotten Tomatoes, the film holds a current approval rating of 90% based on 425 reviews, with an average rating of 8.1/10. The site's critical consensus reads: "A boldly provocative, timely thriller, Promising Young Woman is an auspicious feature debut for writer-director Emerald Fennell — and a career highlight for Carey Mulligan." On Metacritic, the film holds a weighted average score of 72 out of 100 based on 48 critics, indicating "generally favourable" reviews. Audiences polled by CinemaScore gave the film an average grade of "B+" on an A+ to F scale, while those surveyed by PostTrak gave it a 73% overall positive score, with 43% of respondents saying they would definitely recommend it.

Critics praised Mulligan's performance, Fennell's direction and screenplay, and the film's willingness to subvert the rape-revenge genre. Kate Erbland of IndieWire graded the film "B+" and wrote that it "twists its buzzword-laden, spoiler-free synopsis … into something fresh and totally wild." Justin Chang of the Los Angeles Times observed: "The grimly multitasking finale … feels both audacious and uncertain of itself." Linda Holmes of NPR wrote: "Fennell is saying something here, too, about men — about nice men and about men who think they're nice men, or nice enough men."

However, as the film's public exposure grew, its ending, tone and feminist credentials became subjects of greater scrutiny. For example, a commentary in The Washington Post described the film as "polarising", observing that while it functions as a "provocative feminist subversion of the rape-revenge genre", it also "can't decide whether it wants the audience to cheer for its heroine's cleverness and pluck or worry about her mental and physical safety." A review in the Men's magazine GQ noted that the film "has had a whole extra year to tease out audience expectations… now it arrives … with criticisms about under-whelming feminist credentials biting at its rear."

Reflecting its increasingly debated status, the film has been incorporated into academic and cultural discussions about post-#MeToo cinema and feminist genre revision. A 2024 article in Brief Encounters journal described Promising Young Woman as part of the "Feminist New Wave" of films that interrogate rape culture within a post-Weinstein context. The article positions the film not as a typical rape-revenge but rather a rape-revolt narrative.

=== Accolades ===
Promising Young Woman was nominated for five categories at the 93rd Academy Awards and won Best Original Screenplay. This film was longlisted in 13 categories at the 74th British Academy Film Awards, including Best Director for Fennell, Best Actress for Mulligan, and Best Supporting Actor for Burnham. It was finalized at six categories and won two awards, for Best Original Screenplay and Outstanding British Film. It was nominated for four categories at the 78th Golden Globe Awards, and six at the 26th Critics' Choice Awards. It won Best Actress for Mulligan and Best Original Screenplay for Fennell. It further received a Screen Actors Guild Awards nomination, and four AACTA Awards nominations, winning Best International Film and Best International Actress for Mulligan. The Writers Guild of America ranked the film's screenplay the 23rd greatest of the 21st century.
