= Treasure (1958 TV series) =

- Country of origin: United States

Production
- Production company: Bill Burrud Productions

Original release
- Network: KCOP-TV
- Release: 1958

Treasure is a syndicated American television series created in 1958 by Bill Burrud Productions. The series originally aired on KCOP-TV. It filmed documentaries on buried treasure, lost cities, shipwrecks, and ghost towns.

The crew included producer Bill Burrud, Milas Hinshaw, Buddy Noonan, Guy Adenis (who received an Emmy award for Outstanding Achievement in Cinematography in 1971 for his work on Wildfire! which was narrated by Lorne Greene), Leland W. Hansen, Gene McCabe, Thomas Penfield, Bill Southworth, and Ronald Munns.

One episode included "Death Valley's Stovepipe Wells" about gold prospecting during the mid-1800s in Stovepipe Wells, California located in Death Valley. Other episodes included "Queho's Secret Hideout", consisting of two episodes that focused on the legend of Queho, a Native American who was portrayed in the series by actor Buddy Noonan. In that episode, Milas Hinshaw played the part of a prospector mining for gold in the Sierra Nevada. The series also produced "Ben Sublett: A Man With Two Faces" about Ben Sublett and his lost gold mine. Additional episodes included Slumach's Gold, Pirates Passage, Isle Royal, The Lost Adam's Diggings, Devil's Mountain, Percy Fossett's City Of Gold, Diamonds at Dead Man's Cave, The Vanishing Ace, Lost Loot of Pancho Villa, Shipwreck of the Dry Tortugas, Aztec Gold, Death on the Wilderness Road, Treasure of Ulloa, The Legend of Louis Candelas, Golden Idol of the Incas, Sir Harry Oakes Lost Fortune, Search for Robert Livingston's Treasure, Massacre of the Richelieu, The Last Inca Princess, Lost City of Baroyeca, Secrets of San Miguel Island, Riddle of the Guardian Ghost, Treasure Sands of Tortuga, Trail of the Four Eyed Cat, Oak Island, and the Search for the Holy Grail.
