= Cyril Treasure =

English footballer

Personal information
- Full name: Charles James Treasure
- Date of birth: 2 December 1895
- Place of birth: Farrington Gurney, England
- Date of death: 1985 (aged 88–89)
- Position: Full-back

Senior career*
Years	Team	Apps	(Gls)
1914–1915	Paulton Rovers		
1919–1922	Bristol City	63	(0)
1922–1923	Halifax Town	8	(0)
1923	Taunton United		
Total		71	(0)
- * Club domestic league appearances and goals

Charles James Treasure (2 December 1895 – 1985) was an English footballer who played in the Football League for Bristol City and Halifax Town.Retro football player. Retrieved on April 7, 2021.
