= MV Treasure =

MV Treasure may refer to:

- MV Treasure (1982) (1983–2000; IMO number: 8011251) – cargo ship that sank off the coast of South Africa in 2000 – see MV Treasure oil spill
- MV Treasure (1990) (1990–; IMO number: 8617940) – heavy load carrier
- Empire Treasure (1942–1969) – the Empire ship Treasure – see List of Empire ships (Th–Ty)
