= The Invite =

2026 film by Olivia Wilde

- Theatrical release poster
- Directed by: Olivia Wilde
- Screenplay by: Will McCormack; Rashida Jones
- Based on: Sentimental by Cesc Gay
- Produced by: Ben Browning; Megan Ellison; David Permut
- Starring: Seth Rogen; Olivia Wilde; Penélope Cruz; Edward Norton
- Cinematography: Adam Newport-Berra
- Edited by: Yorgos Mavropsaridis; Anthony Boys
- Music by: Devonté Hynes
- Production companies: Annapurna Pictures; FilmNation Entertainment; Permut Presentations
- Distributed by: A24
- Release dates: January 24, 2026 (Sundance); June 26, 2026 (United States)
- Running time: 107 minutes
- Country: United States
- Language: English
- Budget: $15 million
- Box office: $62.9 million

The Invite is a 2026 American sex comedy drama film directed by Olivia Wilde from a screenplay by Will McCormack and Rashida Jones. It is an English-language remake of the 2020 Spanish film The People Upstairs (Sentimental) by Cesc Gay. The film stars Seth Rogen, Wilde, Penélope Cruz, and Edward Norton.

The film premiered at the Eccles Theater as a part of the 2026 Sundance Film Festival on January 24, receiving positive reviews. It received a limited release in the United States on June 26, before opening wide on July 10, by A24, and has grossed $62.9 million worldwide.

== Plot ==
In San Francisco, musician Joe arrives home from his job as a band teacher at a conservatory, to discover his stay-at-home wife, Angela, has invited their upstairs neighbors, divorcée, Piña, and widower, Hawk, over for dinner at their apartment. Joe and Angela's marriage is rocky, and they bicker constantly, most recently over the loud sex sounds they often hear from upstairs. Joe plans to confront the couple, but Angela, who is desperate to impress the neighbors, demands he keep calm and quiet.

Piña and Hawk arrive at the apartment as Joe and Angela are mid-argument. Unprepared to host a dinner party, Angela makes several awkward mistakes, such as not having any wine, and not checking Piña's dietary restrictions. Meanwhile, Joe openly antagonizes the couple, but is surprised to see they are impressed by his brutally honest nature. The group eventually warm up to one another, although Joe still resents his neighbors.

Later that night, Piña and Hawk apologize for the noise they make during sex, and reveal to Joe and Angela that they participate in sex parties, which is the reason for the noise; Joe and Angela are titillated by this discovery, but Joe grows angry again when he learns Hawk has seen Angela naked through a window. Breaking the tension, Hawk admits that he and Piña came to the dinner party hoping to invite Joe and Angela to have group sex with them. Joe and Angela are eager, but Piña, who is a psychotherapist and sexologist, is unsure after seeing the couple fight throughout the night. Instead, they decide to swap partners. However, Angela is too nervous to initiate sex with Hawk, while Joe falls while dancing with Piña, and hurts his back.

Another argument erupts between Joe and Angela, and he berates their neighbors. Piña gets the couple to talk about their relationship, and learns of the resentment they have for each other and the fact they have not had sex in a year. Piña suggests the couple should separate instead of sticking together for the sake of their daughter, Maggie, or find a way to reframe their relationship, as the current status appears to have run its course. Joe and Angela seemingly agree to separate, and discuss their next moves, but upon returning from the kitchen, discover Piña and Hawk have left. Joe returns to his office and plays his piano, which he had previously refused to play, with Angela eventually joining him.

== Cast ==
- Seth Rogen as Joe
- Olivia Wilde as Angela
- Penélope Cruz as Pina
- Edward Norton as Howard “Hawk” Kelly

== Production ==
=== Development and writing ===
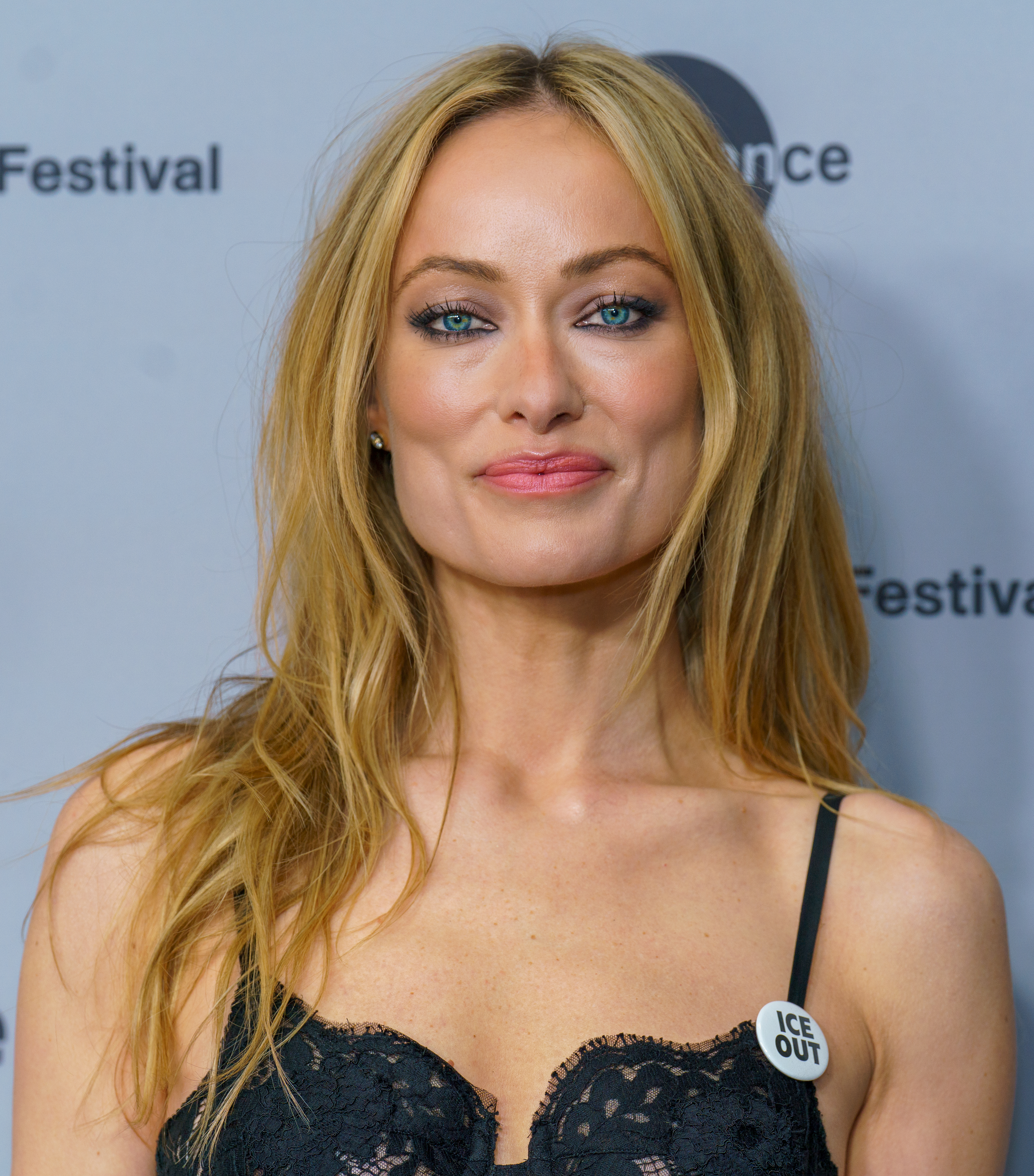
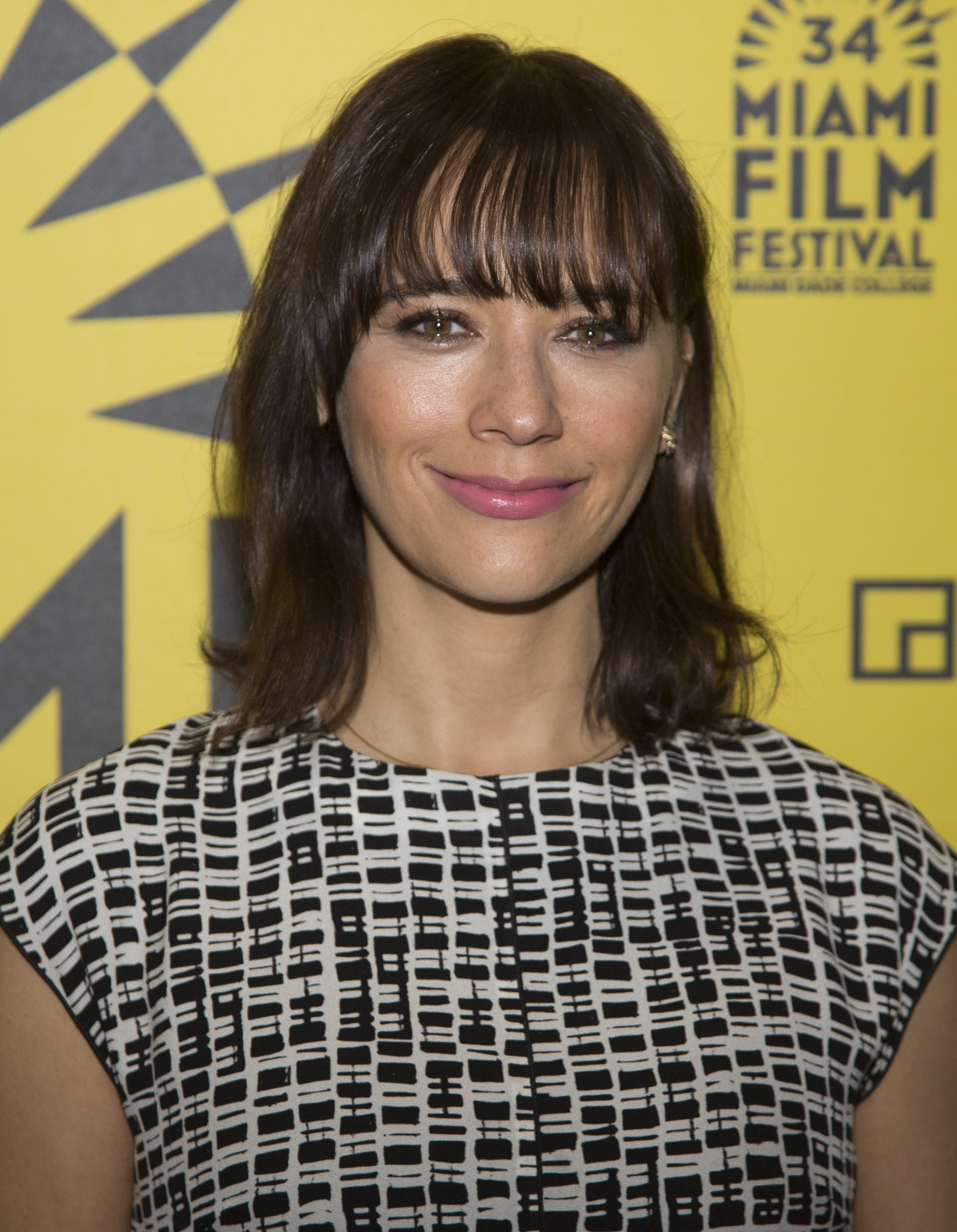
Olivia Wilde (left), the film's director and star, and Rashida Jones, the film's co-screenwriter

In March 2021, it was announced that a remake of the 2020 Spanish film The People Upstairs (Sentimental), an adaptation of Cesc Gay's stage play Els veïns de dalt / The Neighbors Upstairs was in development from producer David Permut. The original film had also been adapted in France, Italy, Switzerland, and South Korea. In March 2022, Jonathan Dayton and Valerie Faris were hired to direct the film, with Rashida Jones and Will McCormack set to write the screenplay. In May 2023, retitled The Invite, Amy Adams, Paul Rudd and Tessa Thompson were cast to star. Development stalled until April 2025, when it was revealed Olivia Wilde would direct a cast including Seth Rogen, Penélope Cruz, Edward Norton and herself with filming underway in Los Angeles.

The film is dedicated to Diane Keaton, who died on October 11, 2025.

=== Filming ===
On May 21, 2025, it was reported that filming took place in San Francisco on Tuesday and Wednesday of that week, specifically at the auditorium in A.P. Giannini Middle School in the Sunset District, a BART train from Glen Park station to Balboa Park station, Make-Out Room nightclub in the Mission District, Castro District Farmers' Market, and Molinari Delicatessen. It was shot in 23 days, in chronological order. The monologue that Norton's character, Hawk, delivers in the third act regarding the origin of his character's name was written by Norton himself, with Rogen's immediate response improvised. The film was shot on 35 mm film.

=== Music ===
Devonté Hynes composed the score. The first track ("Contentious Environment") was released as a digital single from the soundtrack album on June 15, 2026. The soundtrack was released digitally by A24 Music on June 26. Sade's "By Your Side" (2000) is also featured in the film.

== Release ==
=== Theatrical ===
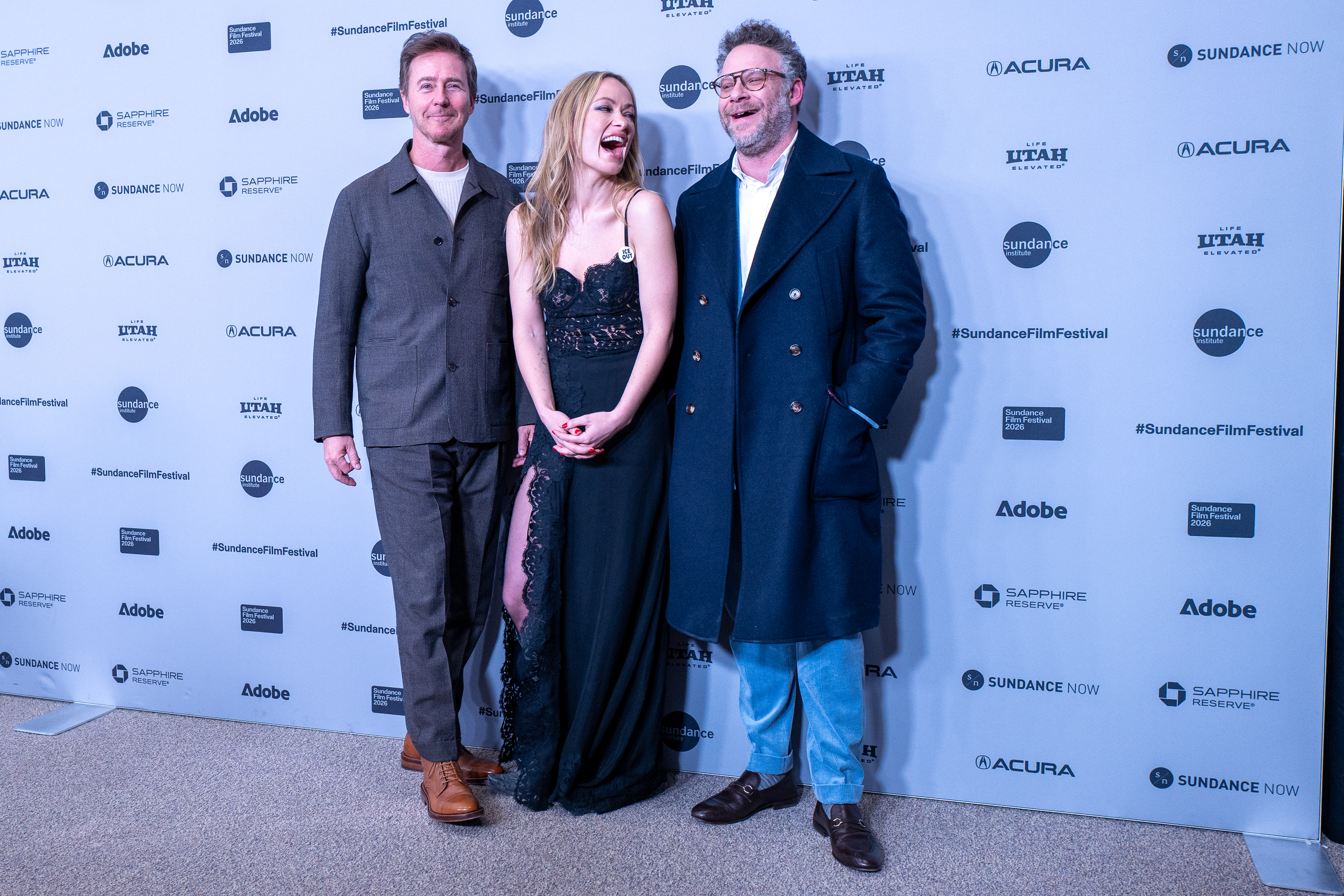
From left to right: Norton, Wilde, and Rogen attending the premiere of The Invite at the 2026 Sundance Film Festival

The Invite premiered at the Eccles Theater as a part of the 2026 Sundance Film Festival on January 24. Following its premiere, multiple studios were reported to be in talks for distribution rights to the film, including A24, Apple TV, Black Bear Pictures (which subsequently acquired UK rights from FilmNation Entertainment), Focus Features, Neon, Netflix, Searchlight Pictures and Sony Pictures, with bids reaching as high as $10 million. One studio offered an unspecified amount of money for a streaming-only release, which Wilde likened to a "bribe" and the team rejected it. The bidding war eventually narrowed down to A24 and Focus, with offers going over $12 million. Despite a last-minute bid from Warner Bros. Pictures' nascent specialty division (later christened Warner Bros. Clockwork), A24 ultimately acquired the film's U.S. distribution rights. The film was also programmed in the main competition of the 73rd Sydney Film Festival, in the Piazza Grande section of the 79th Locarno Film Festival, and in the Perlak section of the 74th San Sebastián International Film Festival.

It received a limited release in the United States on June 26, 2026, with a wide release on July 10, and was released in the United Kingdom on July 3.

=== Home media ===
The Invite was released on digital streaming and VOD platforms on August 11, 2026. It began streaming on HBO Max on October 23.

== Reception ==
=== Box office ===
As of November 8, 2026, The Invite has grossed $26.1 million in the United States and Canada, and $36.7 million in other territories, for a worldwide total of $62.9 million.

The film made $379,000 in Los Angeles and $54,000 in New York City from limited release screenings in its first weekend, all of which were sold out, becoming one of the top per-screen openings of the year.

During its first weekend in the United Kingdom, The Invite grossed £799,382 (approximately $1.06 million) and came in third place. The United States wide expansion opened to 1,610 locations (up from 28 screens) in its third weekend, grossing over $5.7 million for a $7.38 million cumulative and coming in sixth place at the domestic box office.

The film is also the second highest-grossing summer platform release since the COVID-19 pandemic, behind only Wes Anderson's Asteroid City (2023), which earned $28.1 million domestically and $53 million worldwide. When analyzing the film's box office performance, analyst Jeff Bock of Exhibitor Relations noted that independent films "don't have to conquer the summer" and "sometimes success means finding the audience the blockbusters weren't serving".

=== Critical response ===
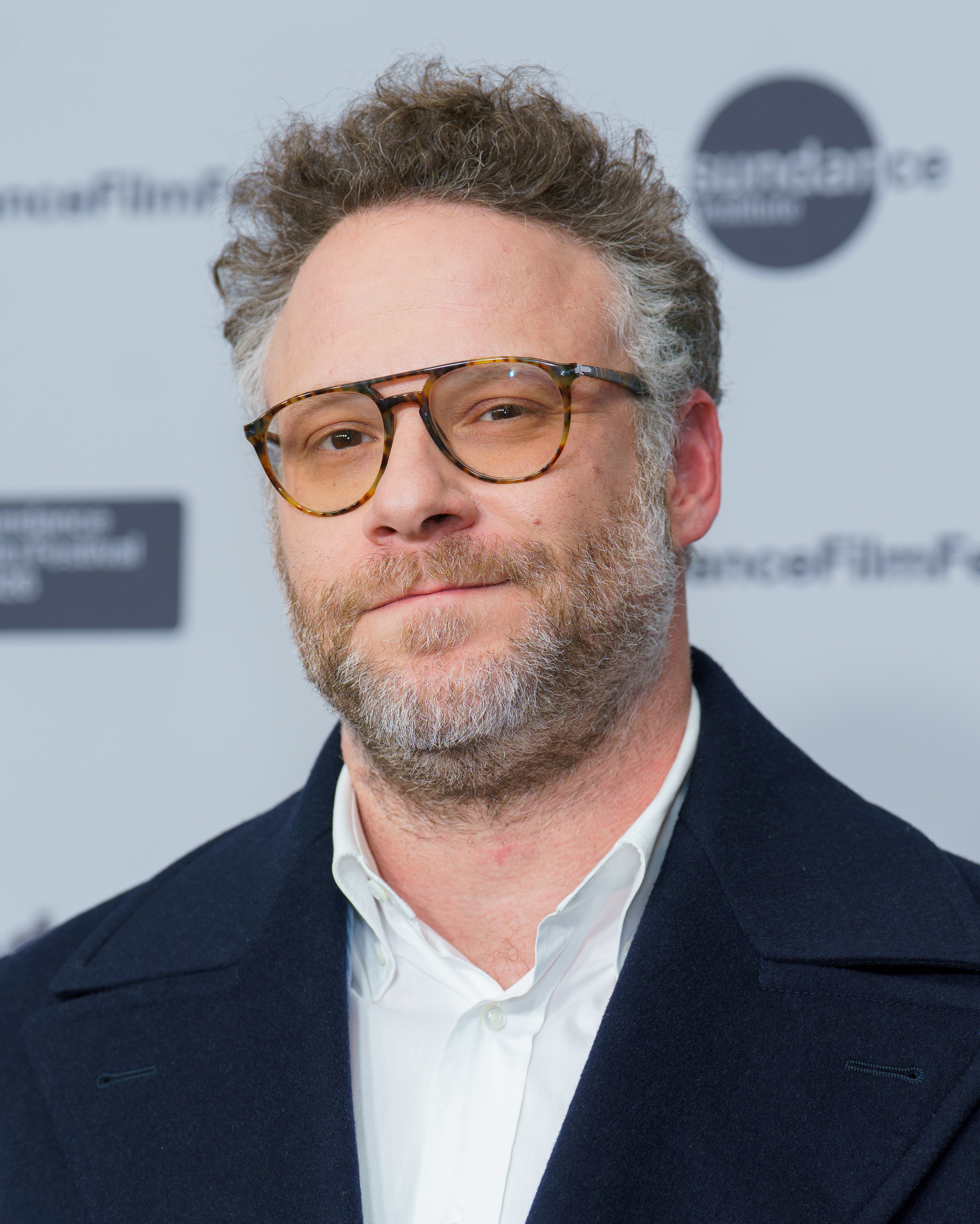
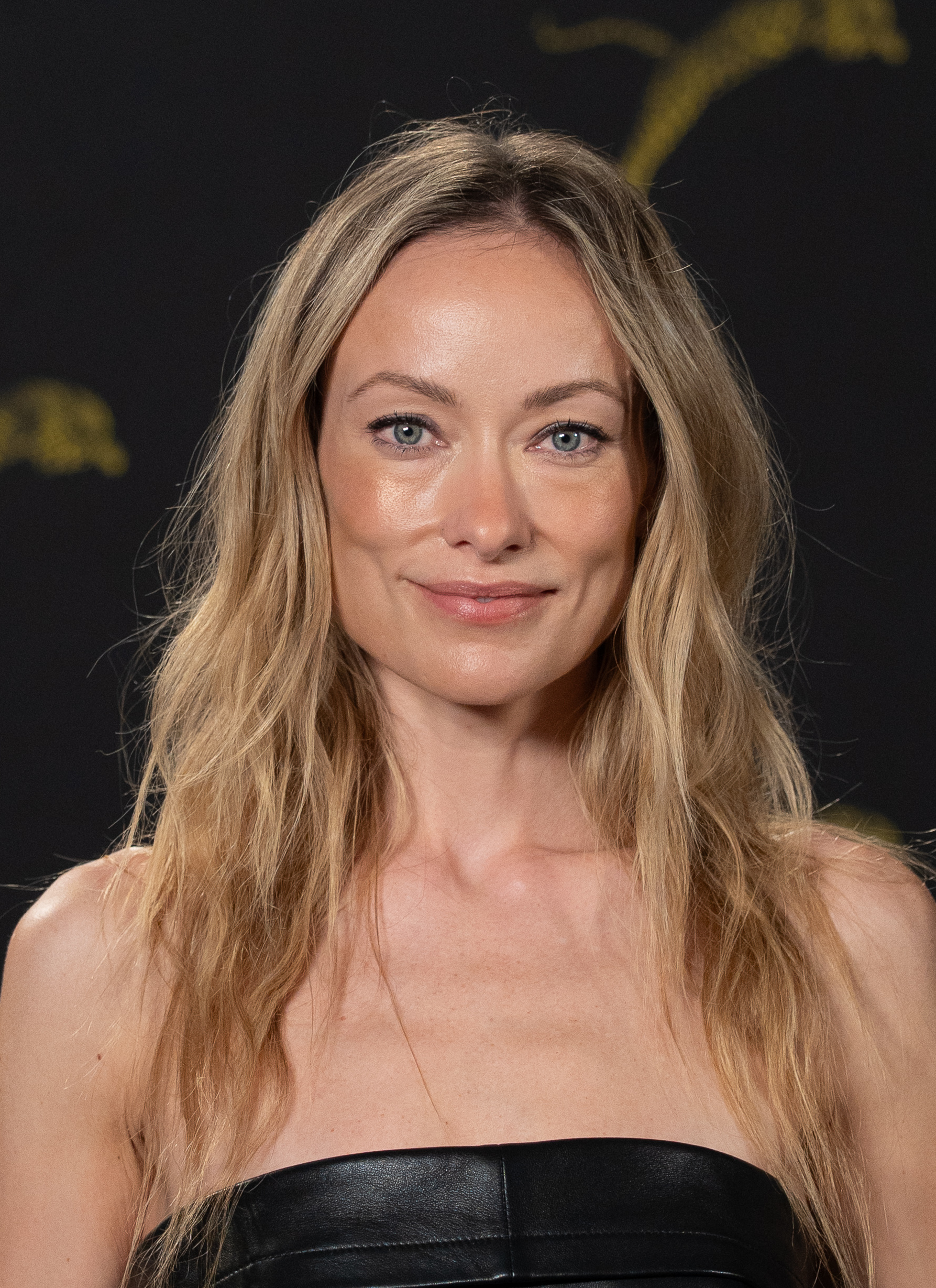
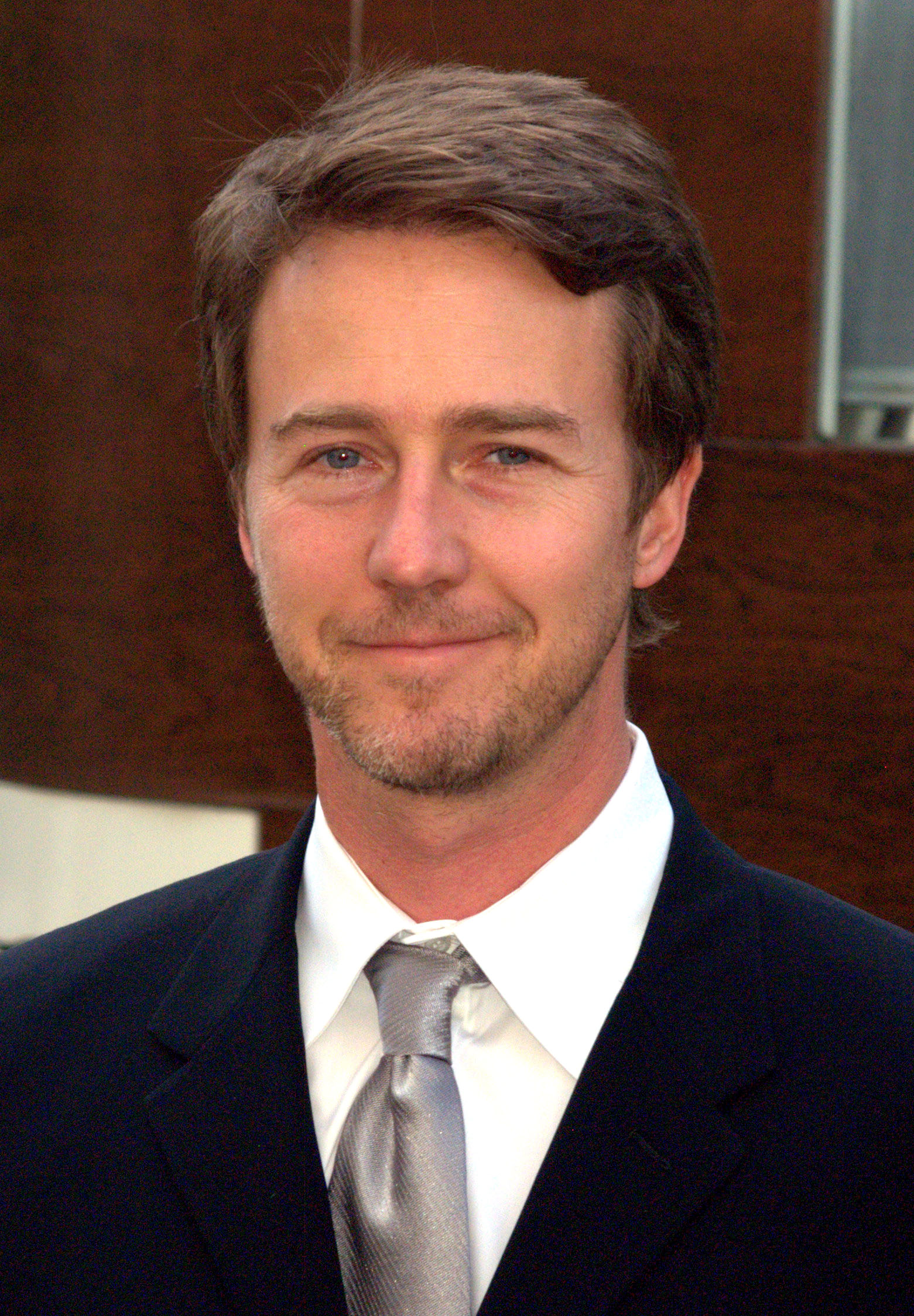
Left to right (top-bottom): The performances of Seth Rogen, Olivia Wilde, Penélope Cruz, and Edward Norton were praised by critics

On the review aggregator website Rotten Tomatoes, 95% of 302 critics' reviews are positive, with an average rating of 8.1/10. The website's consensus reads: "Perversely funny while giving its quartet of fine actors some of their best material yet, The Invite is a sophisticated farce that reaffirms Olivia Wilde as one of the most exciting filmmakers working today." Metacritic, which uses a weighted average, assigned the film a score of 82 out of 100, based on 47 critics, indicating "universal acclaim". Audiences surveyed by PostTrak gave the film an 89% positive score, with 69% saying they would "definitely recommend" it.

Owen Gleiberman of Variety deemed the film to be "marvelously entertaining" and compared it to Who's Afraid of Virginia Woolf? Similarly, Adam Chitwood of TheWrap compared the result to something like "the great-great-grandchild" of Who's Afraid of Virginia Woolf?, underscoring the film to be "endlessly relatable, sometimes uncomfortably so". Benjamin Lee of The Guardian rated the film 4 out of 5 stars, welcoming it as a "genuinely funny and uncommonly intelligent comedy for adults".

Kate Erbland of IndieWire gave the film a B+ rating, assessing that, a bit of stumbling in the third act notwithstanding, the rest of the film is "such a treat, a truly adult comedy with plenty to say and even more laughs to share". David Rooney of The Hollywood Reporter declared the film as "well worth RSVPing" in the bottom line. Glenn Garner of Deadline Hollywood wrote that the film "explores dynamics of sex and relationships with raw and endearing honesty". Tim Grierson of Screen Daily described the film as an "uneven comedy-drama that ultimately has something fresh to say about sex, love and commitment".

Bilge Ebiri of Vulture wrote the characters' "emotional twists don't feel fully earned", also pointing out that The Invite "feels at times like a film that could have benefited from more control", while criticising the musical score. Warning that The Invite "is difficult to describe without causing confusion", Kyle Smith of The Wall Street Journal characterized the film as "a wild fantasy built on a foundation of painful verisimilitude", as well as one of the best films of the year, even if it is "essentially a play". Peter Bradshaw, also of The Guardian, rated the film 4 out of 5 stars, complimenting the comedy and praising Rogen as being "on top of his game". Desirée de Fez of El Periódico de Catalunya gave The Invite a 3-star rating, deeming it to be a solvent and attractive film, although not quite original in its verbal calligraphy.

=== Accolades ===
Award	Date of ceremony	Category	Recipient(s)	Result	Ref.
Astra Midseason Movie Awards	June 30, 2026	Best Picture	The Invite	Runner-up	
Astra Midseason Movie Awards	June 30, 2026	Best Director	Olivia Wilde	Nominated	
Astra Midseason Movie Awards	June 30, 2026	Best Supporting Actor	Edward Norton	Runner-up	
Astra Midseason Movie Awards	June 30, 2026	Best Supporting Actress	Penélope Cruz	Won	
Astra Midseason Movie Awards	June 30, 2026	Best Screenplay	Will McCormack and Rashida Jones	Won	
Golden Trailer Awards	May 28, 2026	Most Original Trailer	"Ding Dong" (A24 / GrandSon)	Nominated	
Humanitas Prize	September 9, 2026	Comedy Feature	Will McCormack and Rashida Jones	Nominated	
Middleburg Film Festival	October 18, 2026	MFF Artistic Achievement Award	Seth Rogen	Won	
SCAD Savannah Film Festival	October 27, 2026	Spotlight Award	Seth Rogen	Won	
Hollywood Music in Media Awards	November 18, 2026	Best Original Score — Independent Film	Devonté Hynes	Nominated	
Gotham Independent Film Awards	November 30, 2026	Best Feature	Olivia Wilde, Ben Browning, Megan Ellison, David Permut	Pending	
Gotham Independent Film Awards	November 30, 2026	Audience Award	Olivia Wilde, Ben Browning, Megan Ellison, David Permut	Pending	
Gotham Independent Film Awards	November 30, 2026	Best Adapted Screenplay	Will McCormack and Rashida Jones	Pending	
Gotham Independent Film Awards	November 30, 2026	Outstanding Supporting Performance	Penélope Cruz	Pending	
