= Bill Burrud =

Child star and television host and producer

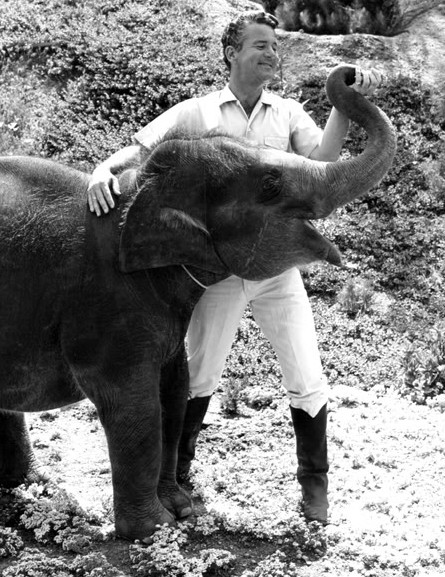
- Burrud and a baby elephant, 1968
- Born: William James Burrud; January 12, 1925; Hollywood, California, US
- Died: July 12, 1990 (aged 65); Sunset Beach, California, US

William James Burrud (January 12, 1925 – July 12, 1990) was a child actor and a television host and producer best known for his travel programs.

== Biography ==
Born in Hollywood, California, Burrud was a son of Leland Burrud, who had produced one of the earliest known travel films in 1913. Burrud made his first film appearance at the age of 7 in Music in the Air. He also appeared in Captains Courageous with Spencer Tracy and in several films starring John Wayne. Burrud served in the U.S. Navy during World War II, then graduated from Harvard University.

In 1950 Burrud turned his attention to television. He coined the word "traventure" to describe the programs he intended to produce. The following year station KTTV in Los Angeles purchased his series The Open Road. In 1954 he founded Bill Burrud Productions, which would produce programs that included True Adventure, Vagabond, Wanderlust, Animal World, Islands in the Sun, Wonderful World of Women, Safari to Adventure, Treasure, and Natural Wonders. His company also produced numerous television specials.

== Death ==
Burrud died from a heart attack in Sunset Beach, California in 1990 at the age of 65. He was buried at Riverside National Cemetery in Riverside, California. His son John Burrud now heads the company.

== Legacy ==
For his many contributions to television entertainment, Burrud received a star on the Hollywood Walk of Fame in 1977. Burrud's star is next to Elvis Presley's.

== Filmography ==
- Music in the Air (1934) (Boy, uncredited)
- His Night Out (1935) (Jimmie, as Billy Burrud)
- Three Kids and a Queen (1935) (Doc, as Billy Burrud)
- Pride of the Marines (1936 film) (Ulysses Simpson Smith, as Billy Burrud)
- Devil's Squadron (1936) (Butch, as Billy Burrud)
- The Cowboy and the Kid (1936) (Jimmy Thomas, as Billy Burrud)
- Postal Inspector (1936) (Billy, as Billy Burrud)
- Two in a Crowd (1936) (Chet, as Billy Burrud)
- The Magnificent Brute (1936) (Pete Finney, as Billy Burrud)
- Girl Overboard (1937 film) (Bobby Stacey, as Billy Burrud)
- Fair Warning (1937 film) (Malcom Berkhardt, as Billy Burrud)
- Captains Courageous (1937 film) (Charles, as Billy Burrud)
- The Man in Blue (1937 film) (Young Frankie, as Billy Burrud)
- It Happened in Hollywood (1937) (Billy the Kid, as Billy Burrud)
- Idol of the Crowds (1937) (Bobby, as Billy Burrud)
- The Night Hawk (1938 film) (Bobby McCormick, as Billy Burrud)
- Hitler's Children (1943 film) (Prof. Nichol's Student, uncredited)
- Treasure (1958 TV series) (Host)
- Flight to Adventure (1960) (Host)
- Thrill Hunters (1967) (Host)
- The Challenging Sea (1969) (Host)
- Safari to Adventure (1969-1975) (Host)
- The World of Reptiles (1971) (Host/Narrator)
