= List of awards and nominations received by Viola Davis =

Viola Davis awards and nominations
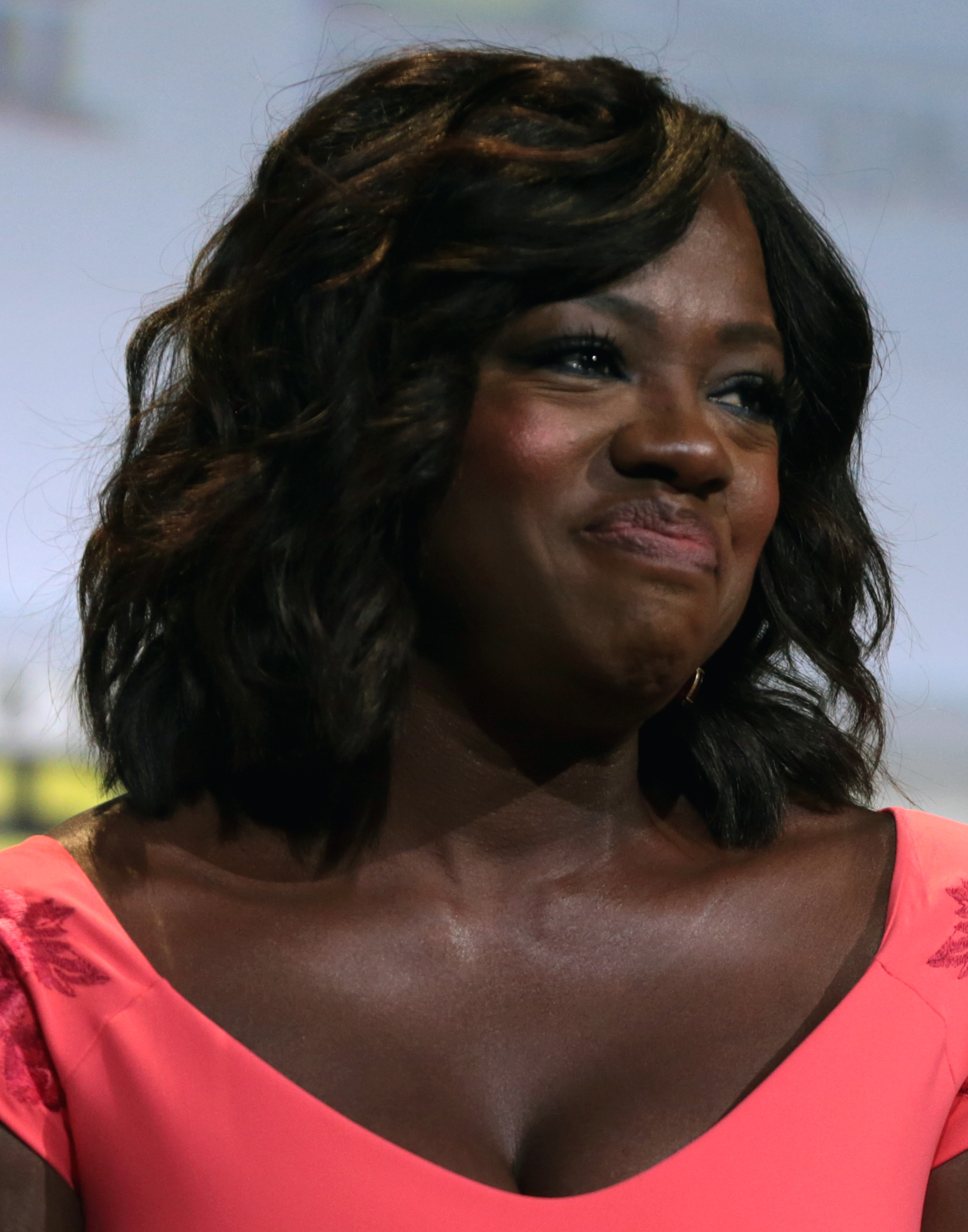
- Davis in 2016
Awards and nominations
Award	Wins	Nominations
Academy Awards	1	4
Actor Awards	6	11
British Academy Film Awards	1	4
Emmy Awards	1	5
Golden Globe Awards	1	7
Grammy Awards	1	1
Tony Awards	2	3

Totals (Note: Certain award groups do not simply award one winner. They acknowledge several different recipients, have runners-up, and have third place. Since this is a specific recognition and is different from losing an award, runner-up mentions are considered wins in this award tally. For simplification and to avoid errors, each award in this list has been presumed to have had a prior nomination.)
- Wins: 126
- Nominations: 250

The following article is a list of awards and nominations received by Viola Davis.

Viola Davis is an American actress and producer. Known for her roles on stage and screen, she is one of the few performers to have won the four major American entertainment awards (EGOT), having won an Academy Award, a Emmy Award, a Grammy Award, and two Tony Awards. She is only the third to achieve both EGOT and Triple Crown of Acting, after Helen Hayes and Rita Moreno. She has also received a British Academy Film Award, five Critics' Choice Awards, three Drama Desk Awards, a Golden Globe Award, and six Screen Actors Guild Awards.

She won the Academy Award for Best Supporting Actress for her film role as suffering mother and wife in the period drama Fences (2016). She was Oscar-nominated for her portrayals as Mrs. Miller in the religious drama Doubt (2008), a maid in the Deep South in the drama The Help (2011), and the title role in drama Ma Rainey's Black Bottom (2020). She was also BAFTA-nominated for her roles in the heist thriller Widows (2018) and in the historical action film The Woman King. Her role in Fences also earned her the BAFTA Award for Best Actress in a Supporting Role, the Golden Globe Award for Best Supporting Actress – Motion Picture, and the Screen Actors Guild Award for Outstanding Supporting Actress.

For her work on television, she made history becoming the first African-American woman to win the Primetime Emmy Award for Outstanding Lead Actress in a Drama Series for her role as Annalise Keating in the ABC legal drama series How to Get Away with Murder at the 67th Primetime Emmy Awards in 2015. The series ran from 2014 to 2020, where she won several awards including the Screen Actors Guild Award for Outstanding Actress in a Drama Series consecutively in 2014 and 2015. Davis reprised the role and was Emmy-nominated for her guest spot in a crossover appearance on another ABC show, the political thriller series Scandal in 2018.

On Broadway, Davis has won two Tony Awards, her performances in revivals of August Wilson plays. She won her first Tony for Best Featured Actress in a Play for playing Tonya in King Hedley II (2001), and her second for Tony Award for Best Actress in a Play for playing Rose Maxson in Fences (2010). She was Tony-nominated for her role as Vera in the revival Seven Guitars (1996). She has also received several other awards for her work on stage including, three Drama Desk Awards, two Obie Awards, two Outer Critics Circle Awards, and a Theatre World Award.

Davis is the recipient of several honors including having a Motion Picture Star on the Hollywood Walk of Fame in 2017, the Cannes Film Festival's Women In Motion Award in 2022, the Gotham Awards Actress Tribute in 2020, and the Film at Lincoln Center's Chaplin Gala Award in 2023. In 2025, she was inducted into the Television Academy Hall of Fame.

== Major industry awards ==
=== Academy Awards ===
The Academy Awards are a set of awards given by the Academy of Motion Picture Arts and Sciences annually for excellence of cinematic achievements.

Year	Category	Nominated work	Result	Ref.
2008	Best Supporting Actress	Doubt	Nominated	
2011	Best Actress	The Help	Nominated	
2016	Best Supporting Actress	Fences	Won	
2020	Best Actress	Ma Rainey's Black Bottom	Nominated	

=== Actor Awards ===
The Actor Awards are organized by the Screen Actors Guild‐American Federation of Television and Radio Artists. First awarded in 1995, the awards aim to recognize excellent achievements in film and television.

Year	Category	Nominated work	Result	Ref.
2008	Outstanding Female Actor in a Supporting Role	Doubt	Nominated	
2008	Outstanding Cast in a Motion Picture (Note: Shared with the cast)	Doubt	Nominated	
2011	Outstanding Cast in a Motion Picture	The Help	Won	
2011	Outstanding Female Actor in a Leading Role	The Help	Won	
2014	Outstanding Female Actor in a Drama Series	How to Get Away with Murder	Won	
2015	Outstanding Female Actor in a Drama Series	How to Get Away with Murder	Won	
2016	Outstanding Female Actor in a Supporting Role	Fences	Won	
2016	Outstanding Cast in a Motion Picture	Fences	Nominated	
2020	Outstanding Cast in a Motion Picture	Ma Rainey's Black Bottom	Nominated	
2020	Outstanding Female Actor in a Leading Role	Ma Rainey's Black Bottom	Won	
2022	Outstanding Female Actor in a Leading Role	The Woman King	Nominated	

=== BAFTA Awards ===
The British Academy Film Awards is an annual award show presented by the British Academy of Film and Television Arts.

Year	Category	Nominated work	Result	Ref.
British Academy Film Awards
2011	Best Actress in a Leading Role	The Help	Nominated	
2016	Best Actress in a Supporting Role	Fences	Won	
2018	Best Actress in a Leading Role	Widows	Nominated	
2022	Best Actress in a Leading Role	The Woman King	Nominated	

=== Emmy Awards ===
The Primetime Emmy Award is an American award bestowed by the Academy of Television Arts & Sciences in recognition of excellence in American primetime television programming.

Year	Work	Category	Result	Ref.
Primetime Emmy Awards
2015	Outstanding Lead Actress in a Drama Series	How to Get Away with Murder (episode: "Freakin' Whack-a-Mole")	Won	
2016	Outstanding Lead Actress in a Drama Series	How to Get Away with Murder (episode: "There's My Baby")	Nominated	
2017	Outstanding Lead Actress in a Drama Series	How to Get Away with Murder (episode: "Wes")	Nominated	
2018	Outstanding Guest Actress in a Drama Series	Scandal (episode: "Allow Me to Reintroduce Myself")	Nominated	
2019	Outstanding Lead Actress in a Drama Series	How to Get Away with Murder (episode: "He Betrayed Us Both")	Nominated	

=== Golden Globe Awards ===
The Golden Globe Awards is an accolade bestowed by the Hollywood Foreign Press Association (HFPA) recognizing excellence in film and television.

Year	Category	Nominated work	Result	Ref.
2008	Best Supporting Actress – Motion Picture	Doubt	Nominated	
2011	Best Actress in a Motion Picture – Drama	The Help	Nominated	
2014	Best Actress in a Television Series – Drama	How to Get Away with Murder	Nominated	
2015	Best Actress in a Television Series – Drama	How to Get Away with Murder	Nominated	
2016	Best Supporting Actress – Motion Picture	Fences	Won	
2020	Best Actress in a Motion Picture – Drama	Ma Rainey's Black Bottom	Nominated	
2022	Best Actress in a Motion Picture – Drama	The Woman King	Nominated	
2024	Cecil B. DeMille Award		Honored	

=== Grammy Awards ===
The Grammys are annual awards presented by The National Academy of Recording Arts & Sciences.

Year	Category	Nominated work	Result	Ref.
2023	Best Audio Book, Narration & Storytelling Recording	Finding Me	Won	

=== Tony Awards ===
The Antoinette Perry Award for Excellence in Theatre, more commonly known as the Tony Award, recognizes achievement in live Broadway theatre. The awards are presented by the American Theatre Wing and The Broadway League at an annual ceremony in New York City. Davis has won two awards from three nominations, all for performances in plays by August Wilson.

Year	Category	Nominated work	Result	Ref.
1996	Best Featured Actress in a Play	Seven Guitars	Nominated	
2001	Best Featured Actress in a Play	King Hedley II	Won	
2010	Best Leading Actress in a Play	Fences	Won	

== Other theatre awards ==
Organizations	Year	Category	Work	Result	Ref.
Drama Desk Awards	1996	Outstanding Featured Actress in a Play	Seven Guitars	Nominated	
Drama Desk Awards	1999	Outstanding Featured Actress in a Play	Everybody's Ruby	Nominated	
Drama Desk Awards	2001	Outstanding Featured Actress in a Play	King Hedley II	Won	
Drama Desk Awards	2004	Outstanding Actress in a Play	Intimate Apparel	Won	
Drama Desk Awards	2010	Outstanding Featured Actress in a Play	Fences	Won	
Lucille Lortel Awards	2005	Outstanding Lead Actress	Intimate Apparel	Nominated	
Obie Awards	1999	Obie Award for Distinguished Performance by an Actress	Everybody's Ruby	Won	
Obie Awards	2004	Obie Award for Distinguished Performance by an Actress	Intimate Apparel	Won	
New York Drama Critics' Circle Award	2010	Special Citation		Honored	
Outer Critics Circle Awards	2001	Outstanding Featured Actress in a Play	King Hedley II	Won	
Outer Critics Circle Awards	2010	Outstanding Actress in a Play	Fences	Won	
Theatre World Award	1995	Theatre World Award	Seven Guitars	Won	

== Critics associations ==
Year	Category	Work	Result	Ref.
AAFCA TV Honors
2020	Best Actress	How to Get Away with Murder	Won	
African-American Film Critics Association
2008	Best Supporting Actress	Doubt	Won	
2011	Best Actress	The Help	Won	
2014	Best Ensemble	Get on Up	Won	
2016	Best Supporting Actress	Fences	Won	
2020	Icon Award	—N/a	Won	
2022	Best Picture (Note: As producer)	The Woman King	Won	
Alliance of Women Film Journalists
2008	Best Supporting Actress	Doubt	Won	
2008	Unforgettable Moment Award	Doubt	Nominated	
2011	Best Actress	The Help	Won	
2011	Best Ensemble Cast	The Help	Nominated	
2011	Female Icon Award	The Help	Nominated	
2016	Actress Defying Age and Ageism	Fences	Nominated	
2016	Best Supporting Actress	Fences	Won	
2018	Actress Defying Age and Ageism	Widows	Won	
2018	Best Actress	Widows	Nominated	
2018	Bravest Performance	Widows	Nominated	
2020	Best Actress	Ma Rainey's Black Bottom	Nominated	
2022	Best Picture	The Woman King	Nominated	
2022	Best Actress	The Woman King	Nominated	
2022	Most Daring Performance	The Woman King	Nominated	
2022	Woman Film Industry Achievement	The Woman King	Won	
Austin Film Critics Association
2016	Best Supporting Actress	Fences	Won	
2020	Best Actress	Ma Rainey's Black Bottom	Nominated	
2020	Best Ensemble	Ma Rainey's Black Bottom	Nominated	
2022	Best Actress	The Woman King	Nominated	
Astra Film Awards
2023	Best Supporting Actress	Air	Nominated	
2023	Best Cast Ensemble	Air	Nominated	
Astra TV Awards
2025	Best TV Movie	G20	Nominated	
2025	Best Cast Ensemble in TV Movie or Limited Series	G20	Nominated	
Black Film Critics Circle
2011	Best Actress	The Help	Won	
2011	Best Ensemble	The Help	Won	
2016	Best Ensemble	Fences	Won	
2016	Best Supporting Actress	Fences	Won	
2018	Best Actress	Widows	Won	
2020	Best Actress	Ma Rainey's Black Bottom	Won	
2022	Best Film	The Woman King	Won	
2022	Pioneer Award	The Woman King	Won	
2022	Best Ensemble	The Woman King	Won	
Boston Online Film Critics Association
2020	Best Ensemble	Ma Rainey's Black Bottom	Won	
Boston Society of Film Critics
2008	Best Supporting Actress	Doubt	Runner-up	
2020	Best Ensemble Cast	Ma Rainey's Black Bottom	Won	
Chicago Film Critics Association
2008	Best Supporting Actress	Doubt	Nominated	
2016	Best Supporting Actress	Fences	Nominated	
2020	Best Actress	Ma Rainey's Black Bottom	Nominated	
Chicago Indie Critics
2016	Best Ensemble Cast	Fences	Nominated	
2016	Best Supporting Actress	Fences	Won	
2020	Best Actress	Ma Rainey's Black Bottom	Won	
2020	Best Ensemble Cast	Ma Rainey's Black Bottom	Won	
Columbus Film Critics Association
2011	Best Actress	The Help	Nominated	
2011	Best Ensemble	The Help	Nominated	
2016	Best Actress	Fences	Runner-up	
2018	Best Actress	Widows	Nominated	
2018	Best Ensemble	Widows	Runner-up	
2020	Best Actress	Ma Rainey's Black Bottom	Nominated	
2020	Best Ensemble	Ma Rainey's Black Bottom	Won	
Critics' Choice Movie Awards
2008	Best Supporting Actress	Doubt	Nominated	
2008	Best Acting Ensemble	Doubt	Nominated	
2012	Best Actress	The Help	Won	
2012	Best Acting Ensemble	The Help	Won	
2016	#SeeHer Award	—N/a	Won	
2016	Best Supporting Actress	Fences	Won	
2016	Best Acting Ensemble	Fences	Nominated	
2018	Best Acting Ensemble	Widows	Nominated	
2020	Best Actress	Ma Rainey's Black Bottom	Nominated	
2020	Best Acting Ensemble	Ma Rainey's Black Bottom	Nominated	
2022	Best Actress	The Woman King	Nominated	
2022	Best Acting Ensemble	The Woman King	Nominated	
Critics' Choice Super Awards
2023	Best Action Movie	The Woman King	Nominated	
2023	Best Actress in an Action Movie	The Woman King	Won	
2025	Best Actress in an Action Series, Limited Series or Made-for-TV Movie	G20	Nominated	
Critics' Choice Television Awards
2014/15	Best Actress in a Drama Series	How to Get Away with Murder	Nominated	
2015	Best Actress in a Drama Series	How to Get Away with Murder	Nominated	
2016	Best Actress in a Drama Series	How to Get Away with Murder	Nominated	
Dallas–Fort Worth Film Critics Association
2008	Best Supporting Actress	Doubt	Won	
2016	Best Supporting Actress	Fences	Won	
2020	Best Actress	Ma Rainey's Black Bottom	3rd Place	
2022	Best Picture	The Woman King	10th Place	
2022	Best Actress	The Woman King	Nominated	
Denver Film Critics Society
2016	Best Supporting Actress	Fences	Won	
2020	Best Actress	Ma Rainey's Black Bottom	Nominated	
2022	Best Actress	The Woman King	Nominated	
Detroit Film Critics Society
2011	Best Actress	The Help	Nominated	
2011	Best Ensemble	The Help	Nominated	
2016	Best Supporting Actress (Note: Tied with Greta Gerwig for 20th Century Women)	Fences	Won	
2020	Best Actress	Ma Rainey's Black Bottom	Nominated	
2020	Best Ensemble	Ma Rainey's Black Bottom	Nominated	
Dublin Film Critics' Circle
2011	Best Actress	The Help	10th Place	
2018	Best Actress	Widows	6th Place	
Florida Film Critics Circle
2016	Best Supporting Actress	Fences	Runner-up	
2020	Best Actress (Note: Tied with Carey Mulligan for Promising Young Woman)	Ma Rainey's Black Bottom	Runner-up	
2020	Best Ensemble	Ma Rainey's Black Bottom	Nominated	
Georgia Film Critics Association
2011	Best Actress	The Help	Nominated	
2016	Best Supporting Actress	Fences	Won	
2018	Best Ensemble	Widows	Nominated	
2020	Best Actress	Ma Rainey's Black Bottom	Nominated	
2020	Best Ensemble	Ma Rainey's Black Bottom	Nominated	
Greater Western New York Film Critics Association
2020	Best Actress	Ma Rainey's Black Bottom	Nominated	
Hawaii Film Critics Society
2016	Best Actress	Fences	Won	
Hollywood Critics Association
2020	Best Actress	Ma Rainey's Black Bottom	Nominated	
2020	Best Ensemble Cast	Ma Rainey's Black Bottom	Nominated	
2022	Best Picture	The Woman King	Nominated	
2022	Best Actress	The Woman King	Nominated	
2022	Best Ensemble Cast	The Woman King	Nominated	
Hollywood Critics Association Midseason Film Awards
2023	Best Supporting Actress	Air	Won	
Houston Film Critics Society
2008	Best Ensemble	Doubt	Won	
2008	Best Supporting Actress	Doubt	Won	
2011	Best Actress	The Help	Nominated	
2016	Best Supporting Actress	Fences	Won	
2020	Best Actress	Ma Rainey's Black Bottom	Nominated	
2022	Best Actress	The Woman King	Nominated	
Indiana Film Journalists Association
2011	Best Supporting Actress	The Help	Won	
2016	Best Supporting Actress	Fences	Won	
2020	Best Actress	Ma Rainey's Black Bottom	Nominated	
2020	Best Ensemble	Ma Rainey's Black Bottom	Won	
IndieWire Critics Poll
2008	Best Supporting Performance	Doubt	10th Place	
2016	Best Supporting Performance	Fences	4th Place	
International Cinephile Society
2016	Best Supporting Actress	Fences	Nominated	
Iowa Film Critics Association
2011	Best Actress	The Help	Won	
2016	Best Supporting Actress	Fences	Won	
2020	Best Actress	Ma Rainey's Black Bottom	Nominated	
Kansas City Film Critics Circle
2016	Best Supporting Actress (Note: Tied with Naomie Harris for Moonlight)	Fences	Won	
Las Vegas Film Critics Society
2016	Best Ensemble	Fences	Nominated	
2016	Best Supporting Actress	Fences	Won	
Latino Entertainment Journalists Association
2020	Best Actress	Ma Rainey's Black Bottom	Nominated	
2020	Best Acting Ensemble	Ma Rainey's Black Bottom	Nominated	
London Film Critics' Circle
2016	Supporting Actress of the Year	Fences	Nominated	
2020	Actress of the Year	Ma Rainey's Black Bottom	Nominated	
Los Angeles Film Critics Association
2008	Best Supporting Actress	Doubt	Runner-up	
2020	Best Actress	Ma Rainey's Black Bottom	Runner-up	
Music City Film Critics Association
2020	Best Actress	Ma Rainey's Black Bottom	Nominated	
2020	Best Ensemble (Note: Tied with the ensemble of One Night in Miami...)	Ma Rainey's Black Bottom	Won	
National Society of Film Critics
2008	Best Supporting Actress	Doubt	Runner-up	
2020	Best Actress	Ma Rainey's Black Bottom	Runner-up	
Nevada Film Critics Society
2011	Best Ensemble Cast	The Help	Won	
New York Film Critics Circle
2008	Best Supporting Actress	Doubt	Runner-up	
New York Film Critics Online
2011	Best Actress	The Help	Runner-up	
2016	Best Supporting Actress	Fences	Won	
North Carolina Film Critics Association
2016	Best Supporting Actress	Fences	Won	
2020	Best Actress	Ma Rainey's Black Bottom	Nominated	
North Dakota Film Society
2020	Best Actress	Ma Rainey's Black Bottom	Nominated	
North Texas Film Critics Association
2011	Best Actress	The Help	Won	
2016	Best Supporting Actress	Fences	Runner-up	
2018	Best Actress	Widows	4th Place	
2020	Best Actress	Ma Rainey's Black Bottom	Nominated	
Oklahoma Film Critics Circle
2016	Best Supporting Actress	Fences	Runner-up	
Online Association of Female Film Critics
2020	Best Actress	Ma Rainey's Black Bottom	Nominated	
2020	Best Acting Ensemble	Ma Rainey's Black Bottom	Nominated	
Online Film Critics Society
2008	Best Supporting Actress	Doubt	Nominated	
2016	Best Supporting Actress	Fences	Nominated	
2020	Best Actress	Ma Rainey's Black Bottom	Nominated	
Philadelphia Film Critics Circle
2018	Best Actress	Widows	Won	
2020	Best Actress	Ma Rainey's Black Bottom	Won	
Phoenix Critics Circle
2016	Best Supporting Actress	Fences	Won	
2020	Best Actress	Ma Rainey's Black Bottom	Nominated	
Phoenix Film Critics Society
2011	Best Actress	The Help	Nominated	
2016	Best Ensemble	Fences	Nominated	
2016	Best Supporting Actress	Fences	Won	
San Diego Film Critics Society
2011	Best Actress	The Help	Nominated	
2011	Best Ensemble	The Help	Nominated	
2013	Best Ensemble	Prisoners	Nominated	
2020	Best Actress	Ma Rainey's Black Bottom	Nominated	
San Francisco Bay Area Film Critics Circle
2016	Best Supporting Actress	Fences	Won	
2020	Best Actress	Ma Rainey's Black Bottom	Nominated	
Seattle Film Critics Society
2016	Best Ensemble Cast	Fences	Nominated	
2016	Best Supporting Actress	Fences	Won	
2018	Best Ensemble Cast	Widows	Won	
2020	Best Actress	Ma Rainey's Black Bottom	Nominated	
Southeastern Film Critics Association
2008	Best Supporting Actress	Doubt	Runner-up	
2011	Best Ensemble	The Help	Won	
2016	Best Supporting Actress	Fences	Won	
St. Louis Film Critics Association
2008	Best Supporting Actress	Doubt	Won	
2011	Best Actress	The Help	Nominated	
2016	Best Supporting Actress	Fences	Won	
2020	Best Actress	Ma Rainey's Black Bottom	Nominated	
2023	Best Actress	Air	Nominated	
Sunset Film Critics Circle
2020	Best Actress	Ma Rainey's Black Bottom	Nominated	
2020	Best Ensemble	Ma Rainey's Black Bottom	Won	
Toronto Film Critics Association
2008	Best Supporting Actress	Doubt	Nominated	
2016	Best Supporting Actress	Fences	Nominated	
2020	Best Actress	Ma Rainey's Black Bottom	Nominated	
Utah Film Critics Association
2016	Best Supporting Actress	Fences	Won	
Vancouver Film Critics Circle
2008	Best Supporting Actress	Doubt	Nominated	
2016	Best Supporting Actress	Fences	Nominated	
2020	Best Actress	Ma Rainey's Black Bottom	Nominated	
Washington D.C. Area Film Critics Association
2008	Best Ensemble	Doubt	Won	
2011	Best Actress	The Help	Nominated	
2011	Best Ensemble	The Help	Nominated	
2013	Best Ensemble	Prisoners	Nominated	
2016	Best Ensemble	Fences	Nominated	
2016	Best Supporting Actress	Fences	Won	
2018	Best Ensemble	Widows	Nominated	
2020	Best Actress	Ma Rainey's Black Bottom	Nominated	
2020	Best Ensemble	Ma Rainey's Black Bottom	Nominated	
2022	Best Actress	The Woman King	Nominated	
2023	Best Actress	Air	Nominated	
Women Film Critics Circle
2011	Best Actress	The Help	Won	
2011	Women's Work: Best Ensemble	The Help	Won	
2016	Lifetime Achievement Award	—N/a	Nominated	
2018	Acting and Activism Award	—N/a	Won	
2018	Best Actress	Widows	Nominated	
2018	Courage in Acting	Widows	Runner-up	
2018	The Invisible Woman Award (Note: Shared with the women of Widows)	Widows	Nominated	
2018	Women's Work: Best Ensemble	Widows	Won	
2022	Best Movie about Women	The Woman King	Nominated	
2022	Best Equality of the Sexes	The Woman King	Nominated	
2022	Karen Morley Award	The Woman King	Runner-up	
2022	Women's Work: Best Ensemble	The Woman King	Won	

== Miscellaneous awards ==
Year	Category	Work	Result	Ref.
AACTA Awards
2016	Best Supporting Actress – International	Fences	Nominated	
2020	Best Lead Actress – International	Ma Rainey's Black Bottom	Nominated	
AARP Movies for Grownups Awards
2016	Best Supporting Actress	Fences	Won	
2016	Best Grownup Love Story (Note: Shared with Denzel Washington)	Fences	Nominated	
2018	Best Actress	Widows	Nominated	
2018	Best Ensemble	Widows	Nominated	
2020	Best Actress	Ma Rainey's Black Bottom	Nominated	
2020	Best Ensemble	Ma Rainey's Black Bottom	Nominated	
2022	Best Picture/Best Movie for Grownups	The Woman King	Nominated	
2022	Best Actress	The Woman King	Nominated	
2022	Best Ensemble	The Woman King	Nominated	
American Film Institute Awards
2022	Top 10 Movies of the Year	The Woman King	Won	
American Society of Cinematographers
2023	Board of the Governors Award	—N/a	Won	
Audie Awards
2023	Audiobook of the Year	Finding Me	Won	
2023	Narration by the Author	Finding Me	Won	
BET Awards
2012	Best Actress	Extremely Loud & Incredibly Close / The Help	Won	
2015	Best Actress	The Disappearance of Eleanor Rigby / Get on Up / How to Get Away with Murder	Nominated	
2016	Best Actress	How to Get Away with Murder	Nominated	
2017	Best Actress	Custody / Fences / Suicide Squad / How to Get Away with Murder	Nominated	
2019	Best Actress	How to Get Away with Murder / Widows	Nominated	
2021	Best Actress	How to Get Away with Murder / Ma Rainey's Black Bottom	Nominated	
2023	Best Movie	The Woman King	Nominated	
2023	Best Actress	The Woman King	Nominated	
2025	Best Actress	G20	Nominated	
Black Reel Awards
2003	Best Supporting Actress	Solaris	Nominated	
2008	Best Supporting Actress	Doubt	Won	
2011	Best Supporting Actress	Eat Pray Love	Nominated	
2012	Best Actress	The Help	Won	
2013	Best Actress	Won't Back Down	Nominated	
2015	Best Supporting Actress	The Disappearance of Eleanor Rigby	Nominated	
2016	Best Actress	Lila & Eve	Nominated	
2017	Best Supporting Actress	Fences	Won	
2019	Best Actress	Widows	Nominated	
2021	Best Actress	Ma Rainey's Black Bottom	Won	
2023	Outstanding Motion Picture	The Woman King	Won	
2023	Best Actress	The Woman King	Nominated	
2024	Outstanding Supporting Performance	Air	Nominated	
Black Reel Awards for Television
2017	Outstanding Actress, Drama Series	How to Get Away with Murder	Nominated	
2017	Outstanding Supporting Actress, TV Movie/Limited Series	Custody	Nominated	
2020	Outstanding Actress, Drama Series	How to Get Away with Murder	Nominated	
2020	Outstanding Actress, TV Movie/Limited Series	Live in Front of a Studio Audience: All In the Family / Good Times	Nominated	
2020	Outstanding Supporting Actress, TV Movie/Limited Series	Troop Zero	Nominated	
2022	Outstanding Actress, TV Movie or Limited Series	The First Lady	Nominated	
2025	Outstanding Lead Performance in a TV Movie or Limited Series	G20	Nominated	
CinemaCon Award
2022	Trailblazer of the Year	The Woman King	Won	
Dorian Awards
2014	TV Performance of the Year - Actress	How to Get Away with Murder	Nominated	
2015	TV Performance of the Year - Actress	How to Get Away with Murder	Nominated	
2016	Film Performance of the Year — Actress	Fences	Won	
2016	Wilde Artist of the Year	—N/a	Nominated	
2020	Film Performance of the Year — Actress	Ma Rainey's Black Bottom	Nominated	
2022	Film Performance of the Year	The Woman King	Nominated	
Hasty Pudding Theatricals
2021	Woman of the Year	—N/a	Won	
Hollywood Film Awards
2012	Ensemble Award	The Help	Won	
Independent Spirit Awards
2002	Best Supporting Female	Antwone Fisher	Nominated	
2020	Best Female Lead	Ma Rainey's Black Bottom	Nominated	
Irish Film & Television Academy Awards
2017	Best International Actress	Fences	Nominated	
2023	Best International Actress	The Woman King	Nominated	
MTV Movie & TV Awards
2012	Best Cast (Note: Shared with Emma Stone, Bryce Dallas Howard, Octavia Spencer, and Jessica Chastain)	The Help	Nominated	
NAACP Image Award
2010	Outstanding Supporting Actress in a Comedy Series	United States of Tara	Nominated	
2012	Outstanding Actress in a Motion Picture	The Help	Won	
2013	Outstanding Actress in a Motion Picture	Won't Back Down	Won	
2014	Outstanding Actress in a Drama Series	How to Get Away with Murder	Won	
2014	Outstanding Actress in a Motion Picture	The Disappearance of Eleanor Rigby	Nominated	
2014	Outstanding Supporting Actress in a Motion Picture	Get on Up	Nominated	
2015	Entertainer of the Year	—N/a	Nominated	
2015	Outstanding Actress in a Drama Series	How to Get Away with Murder	Nominated	
2015	Outstanding Actress in a Motion Picture	Lila and Eve	Nominated	
2016	Entertainer of the Year	—N/a	Nominated	
2016	Outstanding Actress in a Drama Series	How to Get Away with Murder	Nominated	
2016	Outstanding Supporting Actress in a Motion Picture	Fences	Won	
2017	Outstanding Actress in a Drama Series	How to Get Away with Murder	Nominated	
2018	Outstanding Actress in a Drama Series	How to Get Away with Murder	Nominated	
2018	Outstanding Actress in a Motion Picture	Widows	Nominated	
2018	Outstanding Ensemble Cast in a Motion Picture	Widows	Nominated	
2019	Outstanding Actress in a Drama Series	How to Get Away with Murder	Nominated	
2020	Entertainer of the Year	—N/a	Nominated	
2020	Outstanding Actress in a Drama Series	How to Get Away with Murder	Won	
2020	Outstanding Actress in a Motion Picture	Ma Rainey's Black Bottom	Won	
2020	Outstanding Ensemble Cast in a Motion Picture	Ma Rainey's Black Bottom	Won	
2022	Entertainer of the Year	—N/a	Nominated	
2022	Outstanding Motion Picture	The Woman King	Nominated	
2022	Outstanding Actress in a Motion Picture	The Woman King	Won	
2022	Outstanding Ensemble Cast in a Motion Picture	The Woman King	Nominated	
2022	Outstanding Actress in a Miniseries or Special	The First Lady	Nominated	
2022	Outstanding Literary Work – Nonfiction	Finding Me	Won	
NAACP Theatre Awards
2019	Trailblazer Award	Herself	Honoree	
National Board of Review
2008	Best Breakthrough Female Performance	Doubt	Won	
2008	Best Cast	Doubt	Won	
2012	Best Cast	The Help	Won	
2013	Best Cast	Prisoners	Won	
2022	Top Ten Films	The Woman King	Won	
Palm Springs International Film Festival
2021	Desert Palm Achievement Award - Actress	Ma Rainey's Black Bottom	Won	
2023	Chairman's Award	The Woman King	Won	
People's Choice Awards
2014	Favorite Actress in a New TV Series	How to Get Away with Murder	Won	
2015	Favorite Dramatic TV Actress	How to Get Away with Murder	Nominated	
2016	Favorite Dramatic TV Actress	How to Get Away with Murder	Nominated	
2022	Action Movie of 2022	The Woman King	Nominated	
2022	Female Movie Star of 2022	The Woman King	Nominated	
2022	Action Movie Star of 2022	The Woman King	Nominated	
2024	The Female Movie Star of the Year	The Hunger Games: The Ballad of Songbirds & Snakes	Nominated	
2024	The Action Movie Star of the Year	The Hunger Games: The Ballad of Songbirds & Snakes	Nominated	
Santa Barbara International Film Festival
2009	Virtuoso Award	Doubt	Won	
2012	Outstanding Performance of the Year	The Help	Won	
Satellite Awards
2012	Best Actress in a Motion Picture – Drama	The Help	Won	
2012	Best Cast – Motion Picture	The Help	Won	
2016	Best Supporting Actress – Motion Picture	Fences	Nominated	
2018	Best Actress in a Motion Picture – Drama	Widows	Nominated	
2020	Best Actress in a Motion Picture – Drama	Ma Rainey's Black Bottom	Nominated	
2022	Best Actress in a Motion Picture – Drama	The Woman King	Nominated	
Saturn Awards
2022	Best Supporting Actress	The Suicide Squad	Nominated	
2024	Best Actress	The Woman King	Nominated	
Teen Choice Awards
2012	Choice Movie Actress: Drama	The Help	Nominated	
Television Critics Association Awards
2015	Individual Achievement in Drama	How to Get Away with Murder	Nominated	
Women in Film Crystal + Lucy Awards
2012	Crystal Award	—N/a	Won	

== Honorary awards ==
Organizations	Year	Award	Result	Ref.
Cannes Film Festival	2022	Women In Motion Award	Honored	
Film at Lincoln Center	2023	Chaplin Award Tribute Gala	Honored	
Gotham Awards	2020	Actress Tribute	Honored	
Hollywood Walk of Fame	2017	Motion Picture Star	Honored	
Public Counsel	2022	William O. Douglas Award	Honored	
San Diego International Film Festival	2026	Gregory Peck Award	Honored	
Television Hall of Fame	2025	Inductee	Honored	

== See also ==
- Viola Davis on screen and stage
