= Viola Davis on screen and stage =

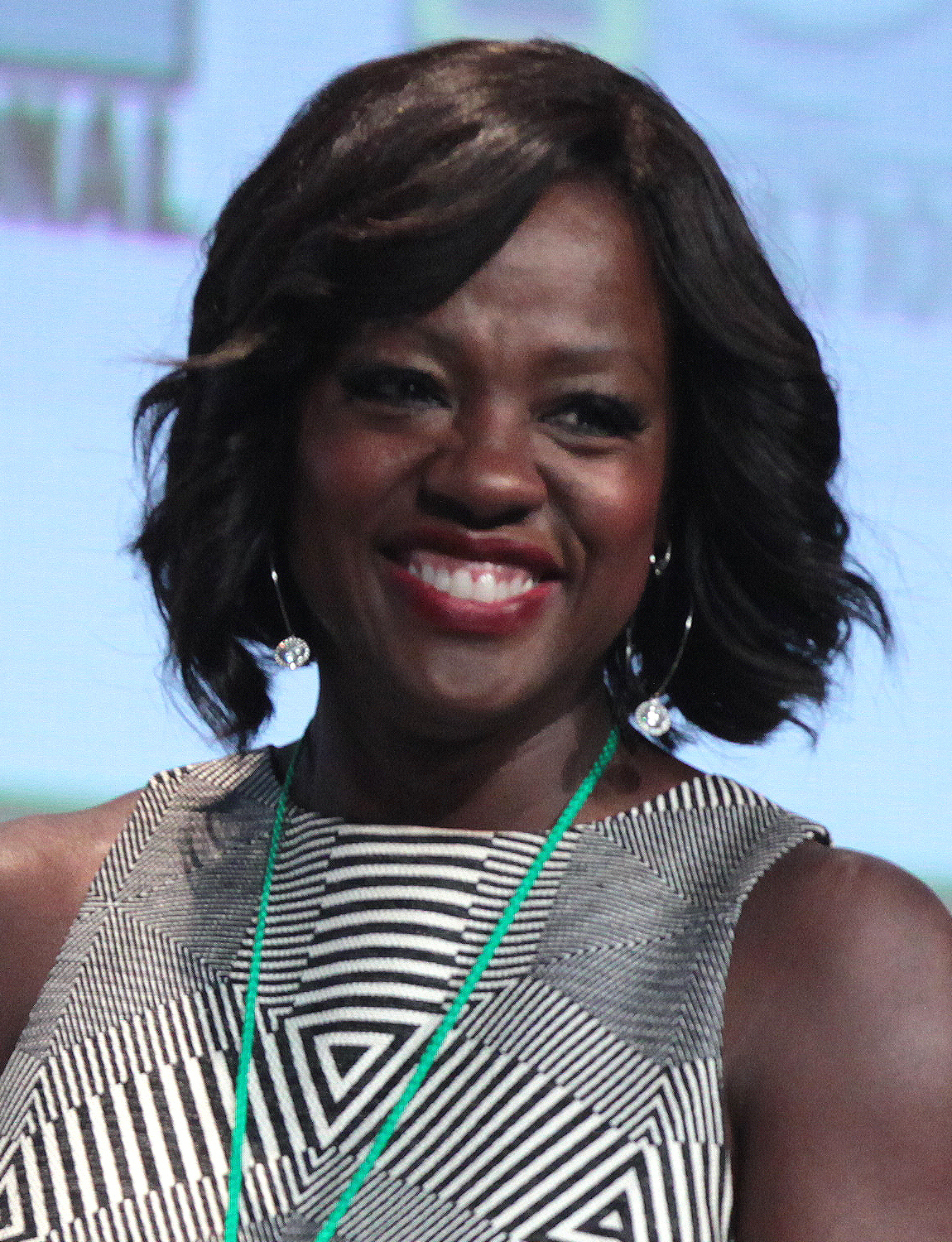
Davis at the 2015 San Diego Comic-Con

Viola Davis is an American actress and producer who has appeared in film, television, and on stage. She received her equity card with her stage debut in 1988 with August Wilson's The Pittsburgh Cycle play Joe Turner's Come and Gone production of Trinity Repertory Company. After graduating from Juilliard School in 1993, Davis went on to perform several roles on stage in the 1990s, earning Theater World Award for her role in Seven Guitars (1996). In the same year, Davis guest-starred in the procedural drama series NYPD Blue, and made her film debut with a brief one-day role alongside Timothy Hutton in The Substance of Fire. In 1998, she appeared in Richard Benjamin's television movie The Pentagon Wars, and Steven Soderbergh's Out of Sight, before returning to the stage with an Obie Award winning titular performance in Off-Broadway Everybody's Ruby (1999).

Davis established herself as a leading actress of Broadway in the 2000s. She starred in her first recurring role in the 2000 medical drama City of Angels, before winning Tony Award for Best Featured Actress in a Play for her performance as a wife of ex-con in King Hedley II (2001), the ninth play of Wilson's The Pittsburgh Cycle. She received further acclaim for her role as a Black seamstress in Intimate Apparel (2004) that won her the Drama Desk Award. Four years later, a supporting role in the period drama Doubt (2008) proved to be a breakthrough for Davis and she received Golden Globe for Best Supporting Actress and the Academy Award for Best Supporting Actress nominations for it. Davis starred opposite Denzel Washington as a dutiful yet strong minded wife Rose Maxson, in a revival of Wilson's play Fences (2010), that earned her Tony Award for Best Actress in a Play. The same year she played Julia Roberts' best friend in romantic-comedy Eat Pray Love.

In 2011, Davis's role in an ensemble drama as a housemaid in The Help earned her Best Actress Oscar nomination, among other accolades. Her performances in school drama Won't Back Down (2012), thriller Prisoners (2013), and biopic Get on Up (2014), added further acclaim to her career. Davis became the first Black woman to win Emmy Award for Best Actress, for her role as criminal defense attorney Annalise Keating in television series How to Get Away with Murder (2014). In 2015, she starred and served as an executive producer in vigilante thriller Lila & Eve, and courtroom drama Custody the following year; both films received a mixed reception overall. She appeared as an antagonist Amanda Waller in superhero film Suicide Squad (2016), her biggest commercial success to date. In the same year, she and Washington reprised their roles in the film-adaption of Fences, for which Davis received Best Supporting Actress honors at the BAFTAs, SAG Awards, Golden Globe Awards, and Academy Awards. Following her Oscar win, she became the first Black actor to win Triple Crown of Acting. Davis co-founded the JuVee Productions with her husband Julius Tennon in 2012.

== Film ==
Year	Title	Role	Notes	Ref.
1996	The Substance of Fire	Nurse		
1998	Out of Sight	Moselle Miller		
1998	Miss Apprehension and Squirt	Sharon Hughes		
2000	Traffic	Social Worker		
2001	The Shrink Is In	Robin		
2001	Ocean's Eleven	Parole board interrogator	Uncredited	
2001	Kate & Leopold	Policewoman		
2002	Far from Heaven	Sybil		
2002	Antwone Fisher	Eva May Fisher		
2002	Solaris	Dr. Gordon		
2005	Get Rich or Die Tryin'	Grandma		
2005	Syriana	CIA Chairwoman	Uncredited	
2006	The Architect	Tonya Neely		
2006	World Trade Center	Mother in Hospital		
2007	Disturbia	Detective Parker		
2008	Nights in Rodanthe	Jean		
2008	Doubt	Mrs. Miller		
2009	Madea Goes to Jail	Ellen St. Matthews		
2009	State of Play	Dr. Judith Franklin		
2009	Law Abiding Citizen	Mayor April Henry		
2009	Beyond All Boundaries	Hortense Johnson / Arsenal Worker	Voice; Short film	
2010	Knight and Day	Director Isabel George		
2010	Eat Pray Love	Delia Shiraz		
2010	It's Kind of a Funny Story	Dr. Minerva		
2010	Trust	Gail Friedman		
2010	The Unforgiving Minute	Narrator	Short film	
2011	The Help	Aibileen Clark		
2011	Extremely Loud and Incredibly Close	Abby Black		
2012	Won't Back Down	Nona Alberts		
2013	Beautiful Creatures	Amarie "Amma" Treadeau		
2013	Ender's Game	Major Anderson		
2013	The Disappearance of Eleanor Rigby	Professor Lillian Friedman		
2013	Prisoners	Nancy Birch		
2014	Get On Up	Susie Brown		
2015	Blackhat	FBI Agent Carol Barrett		
2015	Lila & Eve	Lila Walcott	Also executive producer	
2016	Custody	Judge Martha Sherman	Also executive producer	
2016	Suicide Squad	Amanda Waller		
2016	Fences	Rose Maxson		
2018	Widows	Veronica Rawlings		
2019	Troop Zero	Rayleen		
2020	Giving Voice	Herself	Documentary; also executive producer	
2020	Ma Rainey's Black Bottom	Ma Rainey		
2021	The Suicide Squad	Amanda Waller		
2021	The Unforgivable	Liz Ingram		
2022	The Woman King	Nanisca	Also producer	
2022	Black Adam	Amanda Waller	Uncredited	
2023	Air	Deloris Jordan		
2023	The Hunger Games: The Ballad of Songbirds & Snakes	Dr. Volumnia Gaul		
2024	Kung Fu Panda 4	The Chameleon	Voice	
2025	G20	President Danielle Sutton	Also producer	
2027	Children of Blood and Bone †	Mama Agba	Post-production	
TBA	Ally Clark †	Ally Clark	Post-production; Also producer	

Key
†	Denotes films that have not yet been released

== Television ==
Year	Title	Role	Notes	Ref.
1996	NYPD Blue	Woman	Episode: "Moby Greg"	
1996	New York Undercover	Rebecca Stapleton	Episode: "Smack is Back"	
1998	The Pentagon Wars	Sgt. First Class Fanning	Television film	
1998	Grace and Glorie	Rosemary Allbright	Television film	
2000	Judging Amy	Celeste	Episode: "Blast from the Past"	
2000	City of Angels	Nurse Lynnette Peeler	24 episodes	
2001	Amy & Isabelle	Dottie	Television film	
2001	Providence	Dr. Eleanor Weiss	Episode: "You Can Count On Me"	
2001	The Guardian	Attorney Suzanna Clemons	Episode: "The Men from the Boys"	
2001	Third Watch	Margo Rodriguez	Episode: "Act Brave"	
2002	Law & Order: Criminal Intent	Terry Randolph	Episode: "Badge"	
2002	The Division	Dr. Georgia Davis	Episode: "Remembrance"	
2002	CSI: Crime Scene Investigation	Attorney Campbell	Episode: "The Execution of Catherine Willows"	
2002	Father Lefty	—N/a	Unaired Pilot	
2003	Hack	Stevie Morgan	Episode: "Third Strike"	
2003	Law & Order: Special Victims Unit	Donna Emmett	Episode: "Mercy"	
2003	The Practice	Aisha Crenshaw	Episode: "We the People"	
2004	Century City	Hannah Crane	9 episodes	
2005	Jesse Stone: Stone Cold	Molly Crane	Television film	
2005	Threshold	Victoria Rossi	Episode: "Shock"	
2006	Jesse Stone: Night Passage	Molly Crane	Television film	
2006	Jesse Stone: Death in Paradise	Molly Crane	Television film	
2006	Without a Trace	Audrey Williams	Episode: "White Balance"	
2006	Life Is Not a Fairytale	Diane Barrino	Television film	
2007	Jesse Stone: Sea Change	Molly Crane	Television film	
2007	Traveler	Agent Jan Marlow	8 episodes	
2007	Fort Pit	—N/a	Television film	
2008	Brothers & Sisters	Ellen Snyder	Episode: "Double Negative"	
2008	The Andromeda Strain	Dr. Charlene Barton	3 episodes	
2003–2008	Law & Order: Special Victims Unit	Donna Emmett	7 episodes	
2009	United States of Tara	Lynda P. Frazier	6 episodes	
2013	Sofia the First	Helen Hanshaw	Voice; Episode: "The Buttercups"	
2014–2020	How to Get Away with Murder	Annalise Keating	90 episodes; Lead role, also producer (60 episodes)	
2018	Scandal	Annalise Keating	Episode: "Allow Me to Reintroduce Myself"	
2019	Live in Front of a Studio Audience	Florida Evans	Episode: "All in the Family and Good Times"	
2020	Celebrity IOU	Herself	Episode: "Viola Davis Delivers a Dream Home"	
2022	Peacemaker	Amanda Waller	2 episodes (uncredited)	
2022	The First Lady	Michelle Obama	10 episodes; also executive producer	
2024–present	Creature Commandos	Amanda Waller	Voice; 4 episodes	

Key
†	Denotes television productions that have not yet been released

== Theatre ==
Year	Production	Role	Theater	Ref.
1988	Joe Turner's Come and Gone	Mattie	Trinity Repertory Company	
1992	As You Like It	Denise	Delacorte Theater	
1996	Seven Guitars	Vera	Eugene O'Neill Theater Center; Walter Kerr Theatre, Broadway	
1997	God's Heart	Eleanor	Mitzi E. Newhouse Theater	
1998	Pericles	2nd Fisherman / Lychorida / Bawd	Joseph Papp Public Theater, Martinson Hall	
1999	A Raisin in the Sun	Ruth Younger	Williamstown Theatre Festival	
1999	Everybody's Ruby	Ruby McCollum	Joseph Papp Public Theater / Anspacher Theater	
1999	The Vagina Monologues	Performer (Replacement)	Westside Theatre (Downstairs)	
2001	King Hedley II	Tonya	Virginia Theatre, Broadway	
2004	Intimate Apparel	Esther	Roundabout Theatre	
2010	Fences	Rose Maxson	Cort Theatre, Broadway	

== Producer ==
Year	Production	Notes	Ref.
2014	Camp Logan	Theater play	
2015	The Brink	Short	
2017	The Night Shift	Short	
2017	Emerging Artist Series	TV series	
2017	American Koko	12 episodes, also narrator	
2017	EIF Presents: XQ Super School Live	Television special	
2018	The Last Defense	TV series documentary	
2018	Two Sides	Four-part documentary series	
2023	Silver Dollar Road	Documentary film	
2025	Number One on the Call Sheet	Two-part documentary series; executive producer	

== See also ==
- List of awards and nominations received by Viola Davis
