= 28th NAACP Theatre Awards =

Awards ceremony

- Date: June 17, 2019
- Venue: Millennium Biltmore Hotel
- Hosted by: Loni Love

Highlights
- Most wins: Born For This (6)
- Website: naacptheatreawards.com

The 28th NAACP Theatre Awards, presented by the NAACP, honored outstanding representations and achievements of people of color in theater during the 2018 calendar year. The ceremony was hosted by Loni Love and took place on Monday, June 17, 2019 at the Millennium Biltmore Hotel, Los Angeles.

During the ceremony American actress and singer Lillias White was recognized with the Lifetime Achievement Award. American actress and producer Viola Davis was honored with the Trailblazer Award. American actress Condola Rashad was recognized with the Spirit Award.

== Awards and nominations ==
All nominees are listed below, and the winners are listed in bold.

=== Special honors ===
Lifetime Achievement Award
- **Lillias White**
Trailblazer Award
- **Viola Davis**
Spirit Award
- **Condola Rashad**

=== Directions, writings and productions fields ===
Best Director — Larger Theatre	Best Director — 99 Seat Theatre
**Head of Passes — Tina Landau**; Zoot Suit — Luis Valdez; The Legend of Georgia McBride — Mike Donahue	**The Meeting — Bill Cobbs**; Lyrics from Lockdown — Gina Belafonte; Runaway Home — Shirley Jo Finney
Best Director of a Musical — Larger Theatre	Best Director of a Musical — 99 Seat
**Born For This — Charles Randolph-Wright**; Shout Sister Shout — Randy Johnson; Summer: The Donna Summer Musical — Des McAnuff	**Antony and Cleopatra — Gloria Gifford**; Can God's Love — Spencer M. Collins IV; Her Final New Beginning — Wanda Ray Willis
Best Playwright — Larger Theatre	Best Playwright — 99 Seat Theatre
**Born for This — BeBe Winans and Charles Randolph-Wright**; Summer: The Donna Summer Musical — Colman Domingo, Robert Cary and Des McAnuff; Head of Passes — Tarrell Alvin Me Craney	**King Hedley II — August Wilson**; This Land — Evangeline Ordaz; An Accident — Lydia Stryk
Best Producer — Larger Theatre	Best Producer — 99 Seat Theatre
**Tum Me Loose — Get Lifted Film Company, John Legend and Mike Jackson**; Born For This — My Destiny Productions and Ron Gillyard; Summer: The Donna Summer Musical — Lalolla Playhouse	**This Land — Company of Angels, Danny Munoz and Tamadhur Al-Ageel**; The Meeting — Shannon Sylvain; King Hedley II — Sophina Brown

=== Acting performances fields ===
Best Ensemble Cast —Larger Theatre	Best Ensemble Cast — 99 Seat Theatre
**Summer: The Donna Summer Musical**; Home (Samm-Art Williams play); 946: The Amazing Story of Adolphus Tips	**The Meeting**; Periphery; Les Blancs
Best Lead Female - Larger Theatre	Best Lead Female — 99 Seat Theatre
**Head of Passes — Phylicia Rashad**; Born For This — Deborah Joy Winans; Trouble in Mind — Eamestine Phillips	**An Accident — Katie Rogers**; This Land — LeShay Tomlinson Boyce; Br'er Cotton — Yvonne Huff Lee; This Land — Niketa Calame
Best Lead Male — Larger Theatre	Best Lead Male — 99 Seat Theatre
**Born For This — Juan Winans**; Between Riverside and Crazy — John Cothran; Driving Miss Daisy — Arthur Richardson	**Br'er Cotton — Omete Anassi**; An Accident — Kent Faulcon; Transitions — Joshua Wolf Coleman
Best Supporting Female — Larger Theatre	Best Supporting Female ~ 99 Seat Theatre
**Born For This — Nita Whitaker**; Born For This — Kirsten Wyatt Born; Born For This — Kiandra Richardson	**Peace Be Still — Brely Evans (TIE)**; **Peace Be Still — Anika McFall (TIE)**; Punk Rock — Raven Scott; Runaway Home — Karen Malina White
Best Supporting Male — Larger Theatre	Best Supporting Male — 99 Seat Theatre
**Born For This — Milton Craig Nealy**; Five Guys Named Moe— Rogelio Douglas, Jr; The Legend of Georgia McBride — Larry Powell	**King Hedley I — Adolphus Ward Punk**; Rock — Jacob Gibson; Bret Cotton — Christopher Carrington
Best One Person Show — Larger Theatre	Outstanding Character Voice Performance — Motion Picture
**Tum Me Loose — Joe Morto**	**Lyrics from Lockdown — Bryonn Bain**; Love is a Dirty Word — Giovanni Adams; Conversation “Bout the Girls — Sonia Jackson

=== Music and choreographies ===
Best Choreography — Larger Theatre	Best Choreography — 99 Seat Theatre
**The Legend of Georgia McBride — Paul McGill**; Summer: The Donna Summer Musical — Sergio Trujillo; Born For This — Warren Adams	**Les Blancs — Toyce Guy**; Punk Rock — Matthew Glave; Runaway Home — Janet Roston
Best Music Director — Larger Theatre	Best Music Director — 99 Seat Theatre
**Bom For This — Jaret Landon**; Shout Sister Shout — Rahn Coleman; Summer: The Donna Summer Musical — Rob Melrose	**Love is a Dirty Word — Giovanni Adams**; Elevator — Mario Marchetti; Can God's Love — Cedric Lily
Best Sound — Larger Theatre	Best Sound — 99 Seat Theatre
**Summer: The Donna Summer Musical — Gareth Owen**; Head of Passes — Rob Milbum and Michael Bodeen; Shout Sister Shout — Jon Gottlieb	**Transition — David Darling**; Les Blancs — Jeff Gardner; King Hedley Il — Kevin Novinsky

=== Technical fields ===
Best Costumes — Larger Theatre	Best Costumes — 99 Seat Theatre
**Summer: The Donna Summer Musical — Paul Tazewell**; The Legend of Georgia McBride — EB. Brooks; Born For This — William Ivey Long	**Transition — Kate Bergh**; Les Blanes — Wendell C. Carmichael; Antony and Cleopatra — Gloria Gifford, Lauren Plaxco and Lucy Walsh
Best Lighting — Larger Theatre	Best Lighting — 99 Seat Theatre
**Summer: The Donna Summer Musical — Howell Binkley**; Head of Passes — Jeff Croiter; Born For This — Jason Lyons	**Transition — Donny Jackson**; Les Blancs — Derrick McDaniel; King Hedley Il - Derek Jones
Best Set Design — Larger Theatre	Best Set Design — 99 Seat Theatre
**Head of Passes — G. W. Mercier**; Summer: The Donna Summer Musical — Robert Brill; Big Night — John Lee Beatty	**This Land — Justine Huen**; Bee-luther Hatchee — Christopher Scott Murillo; King Hedley Il — John Iacovelli
