= List of awards and nominations received by Ashanti =

Ashanti awards and nominations
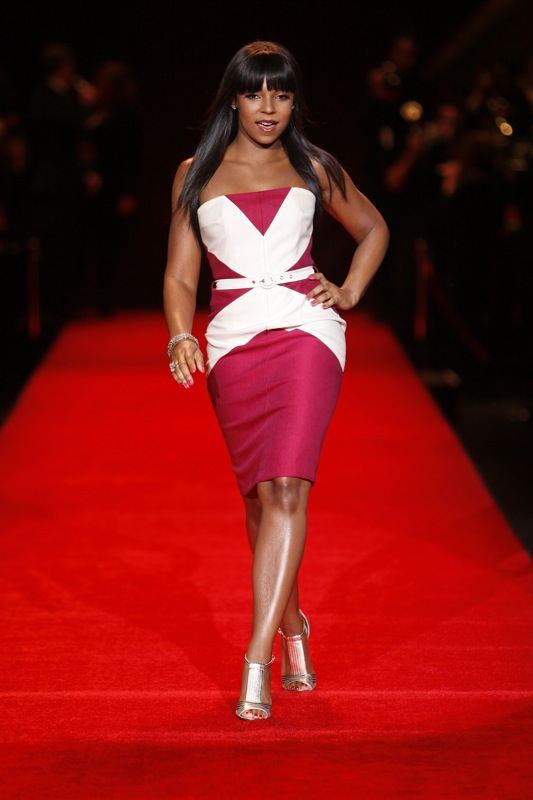
Awards and nominations
Award	Wins	Nominations
American Music Awards	2	7
Billboard	8	9
Grammy	1	8
Soul Train	4	9

Totals (Note: Certain award groups do not simply award one winner. They acknowledge several different recipients, have runners-up, and have third place. Since this is a specific recognition and is different from losing an award, runner-up mentions are considered wins in this award tally. For simplification and to avoid errors, each award in this list has been presumed to have had a prior nomination.)
- Wins: 24
- Nominations: 76

This article lists the awards, nominations and other accolades received by American singer, songwriter and actress Ashanti.

== Awards and nominations ==
Award	Year (Note: Indicates the year of ceremony. Each year is linked to the article about the awards held that year, wherever possible.)	Nominee/work	Category	Result	Ref.
American Music Awards	2003	Herself	Favorite Pop/Rock New Artist	Won	
American Music Awards	2003	Herself	Favorite Hip-Hop/R&B New Artist	Won	
American Music Awards	2003	Herself	Favorite Fan's Choice Award	Nominated	
American Music Awards	2003	Ashanti	Favorite Pop/Rock Album	Nominated	
American Music Awards	2003	Ashanti	Favorite Hip-Hop/R&B Album	Nominated	
American Music Awards	2003	Herself	Favorite Soul/R&B Female Artist	Nominated	
American Music Awards	2003	Chapter II	Favorite Soul/R&B Album	Nominated	
ASCAP Rhythm and Soul Music Awards	2003	"Foolish"	Top R&B/Hip-Hop Song of the Year	Won	
BET Awards	2002	Herself	Best New Artist	Nominated	
BET Awards	2002	"Always on Time" (as featured artist)	Viewers' Choice	Nominated	
BET Awards	2008	"The Way That I Love You"	Video of the Year	Nominated	
Billboard Music Awards	2002	Herself	Female Artist of the Year	Won	
Billboard Music Awards	2002	Herself	Hot 100 Artist of the Year	Won	
Billboard Music Awards	2002	Herself	New Pop Artist of the Year	Won	
Billboard Music Awards	2002	Herself	R&B Artist of the Year	Won	
Billboard Music Awards	2002	Herself	Female R&B Artist of the Year	Won	
Billboard Music Awards	2002	Herself	R&B Singles Artist of the Year	Won	
Billboard Music Awards	2002	Herself	New R&B Artist of the Year	Won	
Billboard Music Awards	2002	"Foolish"	R&B Single of the Year	Won	
Billboard Music Awards	2002	Ashanti	R&B Album of the Year	Nominated	
Black Reel Awards	2006	Herself (for Coach Carter)	Best Breakthrough Performance	Nominated	
Breckenridge Festival of Film	2017	Herself (for Stuck)	Best Actress	Won	
Grammy Awards	2003	Ashanti	Best Contemporary R&B Album	Won	
Grammy Awards	2003	Herself	Best New Artist	Nominated	
Grammy Awards	2003	"Foolish"	Best Female R&B Vocal Performance	Nominated	
Grammy Awards	2003	"Always on Time" (as featured artist)	Best Rap/Sung Collaboration	Nominated	
Grammy Awards	2003	"What's Luv?" (as featured artist)	Best Rap/Sung Collaboration	Nominated	
Grammy Awards	2004	Chapter II	Best Contemporary R&B Album	Nominated	
Grammy Awards	2004	"Rock wit U (Awww Baby)"	Best R&B Song	Nominated	
Grammy Awards	2004	"Rain On Me"	Best Female R&B Vocal Performance	Nominated	
Kids' Choice Awards	2003	Herself	Favorite Female Singer	Won	
Kids' Choice Awards	2004	Herself	Favorite Female Singer	Nominated	
MOBO Awards	2002	Herself	Best R&B Act	Won	
MTV Europe Music Awards	2002	Herself	Best R&B	Nominated	
MTV Europe Music Awards	2003	Herself	Best R&B	Nominated	
MTV Movie Awards	2005	Herself (for Coach Carter)	Breakthrough Female	Nominated	
MTV Video Music Awards	2002	"Foolish"	Best Female Video	Nominated	
MTV Video Music Awards	2002	"Foolish"	Best New Artist in a Video	Nominated	
MTV Video Music Awards	2002	"Foolish"	Best R&B Video	Nominated	
MTV Video Music Awards	2002	"Always on Time" (as featured artist)	Best Hip-Hop Video	Nominated	
MTV Video Music Awards	2002	"What's Luv?" (as featured artist)	Best Hip-Hop Video	Nominated	
MTV Video Music Awards	2003	"Rock wit U (Awww Baby)"	Best R&B Video	Nominated	
MTV Video Music Awards Japan	2003	"Foolish"	Best New Artist	Nominated	
MTV Video Music Awards Japan	2003	"Foolish"	Best R&B Video	Nominated	
MuchMusic Video Awards	2003	"Happy"	Best International Video – Artist	Nominated	
NAACP Image Awards	2003	Herself	Outstanding New Artist	Won	
NAACP Image Awards	2003	Herself	Outstanding Female Artist	Nominated	
NAACP Image Awards	2005	Herself (for Coach Carter)	Outstanding Supporting Actress in a Motion Picture	Nominated	
NAACP Theatre Awards	2010	Herself	Spirit Award	Won	
Soul Train Lady of Soul Awards	2002	Herself	Entertainer of the Year	Won	
Soul Train Lady of Soul Awards	2002	"Foolish"	Best R&B/Soul or Rap New Artist – Solo	Won	
Soul Train Lady of Soul Awards	2002	"Foolish"	Best R&B/Soul Single – Solo	Nominated	
Soul Train Lady of Soul Awards	2002	"Foolish"	R&B/Soul or Rap Song of the Year	Nominated	
Soul Train Lady of Soul Awards	2002	"Foolish"	Best R&B/Soul or Rap Music Video	Nominated	
Soul Train Lady of Soul Awards	2002	Ashanti	R&B/Soul Album of the Year – Solo	Nominated	
Soul Train Music Awards	2003	Ashanti	Best R&B/Soul Album – Female	Won	
Soul Train Music Awards	2003	Ashanti	R&B/Soul or Rap Album of the Year	Nominated	
Soul Train Music Awards	2003	"Foolish"	Best R&B/Soul Single – Female	Won	
Soul Train Music Awards	2004	"Rain on Me"	Best R&B/Soul Single – Female	Nominated	
Soul Train Music Awards	2013	"Never Should Have"	Best Independent R&B/Soul Performance	Won	
Soul Train Music Awards	2018	Herself	Soul Train Certified Award	Nominated	
Soul Train Music Awards	2021	Herself	Lady of Soul Award	Won	
Soul Train Music Awards	2021	Herself	Soul Train Certified Award	Nominated	
Soul Train Music Awards	2023	Herself	Soul Train Certified Award	Nominated	
The Source Hip-Hop Music Awards	2004	Herself	R&B Artist of the Year – Female	Nominated	
Teen Choice Awards	2002	Herself	Choice Breakout Music Artist	Won	
Teen Choice Awards	2002	"Foolish"	Choice Summer Song	Nominated	
Teen Choice Awards	2002	"Foolish"	Choice R&B/Hip-Hop Track	Nominated	
Teen Choice Awards	2002	"What's Luv?" (as featured artist)	Choice R&B/Hip-Hop Track	Nominated	
Teen Choice Awards	2002	"What's Luv?" (as featured artist)	Choice Music Hook Up	Nominated	
Teen Choice Awards	2002	"Always on Time" (as featured artist)	Choice Music Hook Up	Nominated	
Teen Choice Awards	2003	"Rock wit U (Awww Baby)"	Choice R&B/Hip-Hop Track	Nominated	
Teen Choice Awards	2003	"Rock wit U (Awww Baby)"	Choice Summer Song	Nominated	
Teen Choice Awards	2005	Herself (for Coach Carter)	Choice Movie: Female Breakout Star	Nominated	
Teen Choice Awards	2005	Herself	Choice Crossover Artist	Nominated	
Teen Choice Awards	2005	Herself	Choice It Girl	Nominated	

== Other accolades and listicles ==
=== World records ===
Publication	Year	World record	Record holder	Ref.
Guinness World Records	2002	Best-selling debut album in the US in one week by a female	Ashanti (for Ashanti)	

=== Listicles ===
Publisher	Year	Listicle	For	Result	Ref.
Billboard	2025	75 Best R&B Artists of All Time	Herself	61st	
Billboard	2025	Top 100 Female Artists of the 21st Century	Herself	29th	
Forbes	2025	50 Black Female Singers With Incredible Vocals	Herself	30th	
Rolling Stone	2024	The 100 Best R&B Songs of the 21st Century	"Happy"	59th	
VH1	2003	50 Greatest Women of the Video Era	Herself	46th	
VH1	2012	The 100 Greatest Women in Music	Herself	98th	
