= Charles Randolph-Wright =

American film director

- Born: York, South Carolina, United States
- Occupations: Film, Television, and Theatre Director, Television Producer, Screenwriter, Playwright
- Website: https://www.randolph-wright.com/

Charles Randolph-Wright is an American film, television, and theatre director, television producer, screenwriter, and playwright.

== Early life ==
A native of York, South Carolina, Randolph-Wright graduated with honors from York High School. He attended Duke University where he received the A.B. Duke Scholarship and was a pre-med student. As an undergraduate, he studied acting with the Royal Shakespeare Company in London and dance with the Alvin Ailey School in New York City. Randolph-Wright changed his major, and graduated with honors from Duke University with a B.A. degree in theater and religion.

== Career ==
=== Theater ===
Randolph-Wright's earliest Broadway credit was in 1981 as a member of the original cast of the musical Dreamgirls. He then went on to establish a distinguished career in the theater as a director, writer, and producer.

Randolph-Wright directed the Broadway premiere of Alice Childress's Trouble in Mind at Roundabout Theatre Company's American Airlines Theatre. A hit off-Broadway when it premiered in 1955, Trouble in Mind was slated to become the first play by a Black female playwright on Broadway. Producers cancelled the production when Childress refused to tone down the play's anti-racist rhetoric. After decades of Randolph-Wright advocating for Roundabout to produce the play, it premiered on Broadway on November 18, 2021, as Childress originally wrote it. Trouble in Mind earned four Tony Award nominations at the 75th Tony Awards including Best Revival of a Play.

Randolph-Wright directed the world premiere of the musical American Prophet: Frederick Douglass in His Own Words. The musical, which he co-wrote with Grammy winner Marcus Hummon, incorporates the speeches and writings of abolitionist, orator and polymath Frederick Douglass. The production premiered at Arena Stage on July 28, 2022, at Arena Stage starring Cornelius Smith Jr. The opening night audience included Kenneth B. Morris, Jr., Douglass’ great-great-great-grandson, and US Supreme Court Justice Ketanji Brown Jackson.

Randolph-Wright directed Motown: The Musical with a book by Berry Gordy, founder of Motown Records, based on Gordy's autobiography To Be Loved: The Music, the Magic, the Memories of Motown (1994). It premiered on Broadway at the Lunt-Fontaine Theatre on April 14, 2013. A national tour launched in Chicago in April 2014. A West End production opened at the Shaftesbury Theatre on February 11, 2016. A UK and Ireland tour began on October 11, 2018, at The Alexandra, Birmingham.

Randolph-Wright directed Born For This: A New Musical, which he co-wrote with Grammy Award winning gospel artist BeBe Winans and Lisa D'Amour. It premiered in 2016 at the Alliance Theatre in Atlanta in a co-production with Arena Stage in Washington, D.C. Subsequent productions were produced at The Broad Stage in Santa Monica, CA and ArtsEmerson in Boston. At the 28th NAACP Theatre Awards the musical received twelve nominations, winning for Best Director of a Musical and Best Playwright.

Other notable credits include a revival of the musical revue Sophisticated Ladies at Arena Stage, starring Maurice Hines. This production enjoyed a record breaking run at the historic Lincoln Theatre in 2010. He directed Daniel Beaty's Through The Night, which opened Off-Broadway at the Union Square Theatre, produced by Daryl Roth, in the fall of 2010. He also staged a national tour of George and Ira Gershwin's Porgy and Bess that launched in 2010 in celebration of the opera's 75th anniversary.

Randolph-Wright directed two acclaimed productions for Arena Stage of musicals written by Frank Loesser. His revival of Guys and Dolls, which also starred Hines, was selected by the Loesser estate to tour in 2001 in celebration of the musical's 50th anniversary. Randolph-Wright also directed Señor Discretion Himself, the last musical written by Loesser before his death in 1969. It was based on a story by Budd Schulberg and co-written with Culture Clash. The production earned a 2005 Helen Hayes Award for Outstanding Regional Musical.

Randolph-Wright's directing credits include Lynn Nottage's Pulitzer Prize winning play Ruined at Arena Stage, Brian Stokes Mitchell's acclaimed solo show Love/Life at Lincoln Center Theater, They're Playing Our Song (in Portuguese) in Rio de Janeiro and São Paulo, Brasil, Daniel Beaty's Emergency at the Geffen Playhouse, Althol Fugard's Blood Knot, featuring music by Tracy Chapman, at the American Conservatory Theater in San Francisco; the premiere of Cheryl L. West's stage adaptation of the film, Akeelah and the Bee, for the Children's Theatre Company in Minneapolis and Arena Stage; and the world premiere of Oni Faida Lampley's Tough Titty at the Williamstown Theatre Festival.

=== Playwright ===
Randolph-Wright's playwriting credits include Blue, which premiered at Arena Stage in April 2000. With music by Nona Hendryx and direction by Sheldon Epps, it starred Phylicia Rashad, Hill Harper, and Michael McElroy. The Roundabout Theatre Company produced the New York premiere of the play in the summer of 2001. The play received a subsequent production at Pasadena Playhouse starring Ms. Rashad, Diahann Carroll, and Clifton Davis in September 2002.

Randolph-Wright wrote and directed the premiere of his play Cuttin' Up at Arena Stage in the fall of 2005. Adapted from Craig Marberry's best selling book Cuttin' Up: Wit and Wisdom from Black Barber Shops, the play also received productions at Pasadena Playhouse, Cleveland Play House, and the Alliance Theatre.

His play, The Night Is A Child, premiered at the Milwaukee Repertory Theater in March 2008 under the direction of Timothy Douglas. The play received its West Coast premiere in September 2009 in a production at Pasadena Playhouse directed by Sheldon Epps and starring Jobeth Williams.

His play, Love in Afghanistan, premiered at Arena Stage in October 2013 with direction by Lucie Tiberghien.

Randolph-Wright co-wrote and directed Me and Mrs. Jones, a musical which starred Lou Rawls and featured the classic R&B music of the Sound of Philadelphia at the Prince Music Theatre.

He directed The Diva Is Dismissed, starring Jenifer Lewis at the Public Theater and the Hudson Theatre in Los Angeles; Homework starring Kim Coles, Just Between Friends starring Bea Arthur, which toured internationally and was mounted in a Tony nominated run on Broadway.

=== Television ===
Randolph-Wright directed and served as executive producer with Oprah Winfrey for the series Delilah. Created by Craig Wright and produced by Warner Bros. Television and Harpo Films, Delilah aired on the Oprah Winfrey Network (OWN) in 2021. Randolph-Wright also directed episodes of Greenleaf on OWN, including the penultimate episode of the series. Additional credits include Will Trent on ABC, The Santa Clauses on Disney+, The Big Leap on Fox, Katy Keene on The CW, Step Up: Highwater on YouTube Red, Lincoln Heights on ABC Family, and South of Nowhere on The N. Randolph-Wright was also the producer and writer of the Showtime series Linc's and a writer/consultant on the Fox series Lush Life. He has also directed many commercials, including the European "Freestyle" campaign for Nike, which won several international commercial awards, and music videos. His musical staging has been seen on a variety of programs, including The Golden Girls. His acting credits include guest appearances on Melrose Place, Falcon Crest and Hill Street Blues.

=== Film ===
Randolph-Wright made his directorial film debut with Preaching to the Choir, originally titled On the One, which earned the Best Performance by an Actor, Audience Award for Best Narrative Feature, and Grand Jury Prize for Best Picture at the 2005 American Black Film Festival (ABFF). He is executive producer with Debbie Allen of the film Maurice Hines: Bring Them Back, which won the 2019 DOC NYC Grand Jury Prize and the 2020 Jury Award for Best Documentary at ABFF. He has also developed screenplays for Showtime, HBO, Walt Disney Pictures, Victory Entertainment, Producers Entertainment Group, Tim Reid Productions, and 20th Century Fox. He also co-wrote the screenplay White Chocolate with John Leguizamo. Randolph-Wright was the co-producer of the Angela Davis Story for Castle Rock Entertainment, and developed the short film Family Tree (Disney).

=== Honors and awards ===
Randolph-Wright received the 2010 Paul Robeson Award from Actors' Equity Association. Past recipients include Ossie Davis, Ruby Dee, Lloyd Richards, and Sidney Poitier.

In the summer of 2010, Randolph-Wright received a three-year playwright residency as part of Arena Stage's American Voices New Play Institute, which began in January 2011.

He was awarded Duke University's Distinguished Alumni Award in 2017. The annual award honors alumni who have made outstanding contributions through their field of work, in service to the university and toward the betterment of humanity.

Randolph-Wright serves on the board of directors of the Roundabout Theatre Company, the Advisory Committee of the American Theatre Wing, and is an Artistic Associate at the Young Vic. He also serves on the board of directors of the Frederick Douglass Family Initiatives, a non-profit organization founded by direct descendants of Frederick Douglass and Booker T. Washington focused on the struggle for racial equity and an end to human exploitation.
