= NAACP Theatre Award – Trailblazer Award =

Award celebrating people of color in theater

The NAACP Trailblazer Award is presented to a pioneering individual whose theatrical contributions made an outstanding and unique mark in the entertainment industry, therefore, paving the way for others to follow. It is presented part of the NAACP Theatre Awards which commenced in 1991 and presented annually by the Beverly Hills-Hollywood branch of the NAACP to honor outstanding people of color in theatre, following the presentation ceremonies of the NAACP Image Awards.

NAACP Theatre Award – Trailblazer Award
| Year | Honoree |
| 1991 | (1991-2001) INFORMATION OF NOMINEES NOT AVAILABLE |
| 1992 | (1991-2001) INFORMATION OF NOMINEES NOT AVAILABLE |
| 1993 | (1991-2001) INFORMATION OF NOMINEES NOT AVAILABLE |
| 1994 | (1991-2001) INFORMATION OF NOMINEES NOT AVAILABLE |
| 1995 | (1991-2001) INFORMATION OF NOMINEES NOT AVAILABLE |
| 1996 | (1991-2001) INFORMATION OF NOMINEES NOT AVAILABLE |
| 1997 | (1991-2001) INFORMATION OF NOMINEES NOT AVAILABLE |
| 1998 | (1991-2001) INFORMATION OF NOMINEES NOT AVAILABLE |
| 1999 | (1991-2001) INFORMATION OF NOMINEES NOT AVAILABLE |
| 2000 | (1991-2001) INFORMATION OF NOMINEES NOT AVAILABLE |
| 2001 | (1991-2001) INFORMATION OF NOMINEES NOT AVAILABLE |
| 2002 | Sheryl Lee Ralph |
| 2003 | N/A |
| 2004 | N/A |
| 2005 | Negro Ensemble Company |
| 2006 | Tyler Perry |
| 2007 | Je'Caryous Johnson & Gary Guidry (I'm Ready Productions) |
| 2008 | David E. Talbert |
| 2009 | Audra McDonald |
| 2010 | Kenny Leon |
| 2011 | Obba Babatundé |
| 2012 | Stephen Byrd & Alia Jones (Front Row Productions) |
| 2013 | Vanessa Williams |
| 2014 | Roger Guenveur Smith |
| 2015 | N/A |
| 2016 | LaTanya Richardson Jackson |
| 2017 | N/A |
| 2018 | Anika Noni Rose |
| 2019 | Viola Davis |
| 2020 | N/A |
| 2021 | N/A |
| 2022 | Nicco Annan |
| 2023 | N/A |
| 2024 | Stokley Williams |
