= Giving Voice =

2020 documentary film

- Official poster
- Directed by: James D. Stern; Fernando Villena
- Produced by: James D. Stern; Fernando Villena; Karen Bove; Schoen Smith; Craig Pilligan
- Cinematography: Jonathan Narducci
- Edited by: Rose Corr; Wes Lipman; Alexander Hadden
- Music by: Bryan Senti
- Production companies: Endgame Entertainment; Impact Partners; Get Lifted; Pilgrim Media Group; JuVee Productions
- Distributed by: Netflix
- Release dates: January 26, 2020 (Sundance); December 11, 2020 (United States)
- Running time: 87 minutes
- Country: United States
- Language: English

Giving Voice is a 2020 American documentary film, directed and produced by James D. Stern and Fernando Villena. The film follows the 2018 edition of the annual August Wilson Monologue Competition entered by thousands of high school students for the opportunity to perform on Broadway. Viola Davis, John Legend, Constanza Romero and Nicholas Caprio serve as executive producers.

The film had its world premiere at the 2020 Sundance Film Festival, where it won the Festival Favorite award. It was released on December 11, 2020, by Netflix.

== Synopsis ==
Thousands of high school students enter the yearly August Wilson Monologue Competition for the opportunity to perform on Broadway. Denzel Washington, Viola Davis, Jack Viertel, Gerardo Navarro, Nia Sarfo, Freedom Martin, Cody Merridith, Callie Holley and Aaron Guy appear in the film.

== Release ==
The film had its world premiere at the 2020 Sundance Film Festival on January 26. Shortly after, Netflix acquired distribution rights to the film. It was released on December 11, 2020.

== Reception ==
At the Sundance Film Festival, the film won the Festival Favorite Award. Review aggregator website Rotten Tomatoes reported a 100% rating from 16 professional critic reviews, with an average rating of 8.1/10.

In December 2020, the film was named as a New York Times Critic's Pick.
