= Custody (2016 film) =

- Directed by: James Lapine
- Written by: James Lapine
- Produced by: James Lapine; Katie Mustard; Lauren Versel
- Starring: Viola Davis; Catalina Sandino Moreno; Hayden Panettiere; Ellen Burstyn
- Cinematography: Zak Mulligan
- Edited by: Miky Wolf
- Music by: Antônio Pinto
- Production companies: Lucky Monkey Pictures; Mustard & Co; JuVee Productions
- Release date: April 17, 2016 (Tribeca Film Festival)
- Running time: 104 minutes
- Country: United States
- Language: English

Custody is a 2016 American courtroom drama film directed and written by James Lapine. The film stars Viola Davis as a judge who presides over the custody case of a Latina woman named Sara (Catalina Sandino Moreno) whose children are taken away after an episode of domestic violence. Hayden Panettiere plays the lawyer given Sara's case, with Ellen Burstyn, Selenis Leyva, Olga Merediz, Dan Fogler, Raúl Esparza, and Tony Shalhoub in other roles. Custody was filmed in New York City in May 2015.

The film world premiered in the Spotlight section of the 2016 Tribeca Film Festival. The film premiered on Lifetime on March 4, 2017.

== Plot ==
Sara Diaz is a single mother living in New York City with her two kids, 11-year-old David and 8-year-old Tia. One night, she comes home from work to find David in a neighbor's house, where his friends drink and smoke marijuana; after she angrily crashes the party and brings him home, they fight and he accidentally falls over a glass coffee table, injuring his forehead. She quickly bandages him and they make peace before tucking him in. On the next day, David's teacher notices his bruise and sends him to the school infirmary, which prompts the principal to summon ACS agent Luis Sanjuro, who questions Tia about the events of the previous night and takes both children to institutional care. Upon learning of this, Sara goes to their school and is advised by the principal to go to the juvenile court to get them back. Her case is assigned to Martha Schulman, a Black judge suffering from empty nest syndrome after her son Elliot goes to college, and Sara learns she'll be represented by Alexandra 'Ally' Fisher, a top-of-the-class but inexperienced young attorney appointed to her pro bono.

In the first hearing, due to a highly-publicized error that led to the death of a 5-year old girl, the ACS is reluctant to recommend Tia and David's return home as counselor Keith Denholz requests for Sara to undergo a drug test, with which she complies; however, the case is further complicated during a second hearing when the results are positive for marijuana and PCP and Sara loses her temper at the courtroom, prompting Martha to send the children to a temporary foster care and suggest her anger management therapy. This, along with Ally's apparent hesitance to litigate, deeply frustrates Sara. Upon discovering her husband Jason is having an affair with the Caucasian wife of a very close friend of hers, Martha cuts his clothes with scissors, confronts him and angrily kicks him out of their house.

After a third hearing - in which the ACS disputes Sara's former claim that Shawn Monroe, Tia and David's father, is dead and both Martha and Sara lash out at each other - Sara kidnaps her children from care and runs away, but eventually calls Ally for help: they share their life experiences and slowly begin to repair their initially taut relationship. This encourages Ally to confront her grandmother about a molestation suffered at the hands of her uncle Frank when she was little, a claim repeatedly downplayed by the latter "for the sake of the family".

Upon learning Shawn - who is currently arrested - will be brought in before the court, Sara fears Tia and David won't handle the truth well, but Ally assures her it's the right thing. During his interrogation, he expresses outrage at being "left out" of his kids' lives, but says he believes Sara might be a good mother and will agree to their return if both children confirm this. They meet for the first time, and, by the time of the final hearing, Shawn submits an affidavit requesting Sara to take sole custody. The ACS concurs and Martha allows them to return home, much to Sara's relief.

A Christmas party is held for all the court's workforce, at which Martha and Ally exchange their beliefs on the system they work for. When a fellow colleague notes how much she drank, she realizes how stressful her life has become and leaves. The final scene shows Sara, Tia and David cheerfully arriving back home.

== Cast ==
- Viola Davis as Judge Martha Schulman
- Catalina Sandino Moreno as Sara Diaz
- Hayden Panettiere as Ally Fisher
- Ellen Burstyn as Beatrice Fisher
- Selenis Leyva as Jackie, Sara's friend
- Olga Merediz as Joyce, Sara's mother
- Dan Fogler as Keith Denholz
- Raúl Esparza as Luis Sanjuro
- Tony Shalhoub as Jason Schulman
- Kate Jennings Grant as Nancy
- Stephen Kunken as Mark Dooley
- Karen Pittman as Elaine Dunbar
- Valerie Cruz as Claudia Sanjuro
- Julius Tennon as Court Officer Joe
- Nicholas L. Ashe as Elliot Schulman
