= Lila & Eve =

- Theatrical release poster
- Directed by: Charles Stone III
- Written by: Patrick Gilfillan
- Produced by: Sara Risher; Darrin Reed
- Starring: Viola Davis; Jennifer Lopez; Shea Whigham; Andre Royo; Chris Chalk; Julius Tennon; Aml Ameen
- Cinematography: Wyatt Garfield
- Edited by: Robert Lambert
- Music by: Samuel Jones; Alexis Marsh
- Production companies: A+E Studios; ChickFlick Productions; JuVee Productions; Lifetime Films
- Distributed by: Samuel Goldwyn Films
- Release dates: January 30, 2015 (Sundance); July 17, 2015 (United States)
- Running time: 94 minutes
- Country: United States
- Language: English
- Budget: $4.9 million
- Box office: $179,809

Lila & Eve is a 2015 American crime drama film directed by Charles Stone III and written by Patrick Gilfillan. The film stars Viola Davis and Jennifer Lopez. It premiered at the 2015 Sundance Film Festival, and was released in North America on 17 July 2015, in a limited release and through video on demand by Samuel Goldwyn Films. This marks the second time Davis and Lopez acted in a film together, the first being the Steven Soderbergh film Out of Sight in 1998.

== Plot ==
Lila, a single mother living in Atlanta, struggles after the murder of her son Stephon in a drive-by shooting. Faced with indifference from the police force and barely able to take care of herself and her younger son Justin, Lila joins a support group for mothers of murdered children. There, she meets Eve, whose daughter died. Eve sits off to the side without participating. Eve seems less interested in moving on with her life than in seeking revenge.

Lila chooses Eve to be her sponsor, and one night, while engaging in therapeutic home redecorating, they find a gun in Justin's book bag. This discovery horrifies Lila but inspires Eve to suggest they investigate Stephon's murder themselves. The two women find someone with the information they seek. When he pulls a gun on them, Eve shoots him dead, and they flee.

When it seems as if they have gotten away with the shooting, the two women move up the underworld chain of command to discover who ordered the drive-by. With the death of the drug dealer, Alonzo Troys, who actually pulled the trigger, they come to the attention of Ojeda, the hired gun of the kingpin of the criminal organization. As the bodies begin piling up, Lila becomes increasingly unsure of the morality of their actions, while Eve becomes bolder and more daring. Finally, a rift develops between the two women and Eve suddenly disappears.

Around this time, their actions pique the interest of Detective Holliston, the cop assigned to Lila's case. It appears to be only a matter of time before he puts two and two together and figures out who is behind the killings. Lila and Justin are on the way to school one morning when, while sitting at a stop sign, a van containing armed men drives up beside them. Before the men can shoot, Lila pulls out into traffic and is involved in a car accident. This saves their lives when witnesses aid them, stopping the gunmen from finishing them off.

After Lila gets out of the hospital, she and Eve make up. They rig Lila's house with explosives and set up a trap to lure local criminal kingpin, Miguel Alejandro, and his henchmen to come after her by shooting at his home. After he threatens to kill her, and she drops off Eve, Lila visits Ben, her neighbour. When he questions her about Eve, she shows him pictures from her phone, only to be confused when Eve appears in none of them. During the course of the night, Lila realizes that Eve is a figment of her imagination. Lila has done everything herself and is responsible for all the drug dealers' murders. In a late night conversation in the street, "Eve" talks her into finishing the job so she can move on and keep Justin safe.

Ojeda poses as a cable installer and breaks into Lila's house. Finding it empty, he invites Alejandro to wait for her arrival at the house. Lila watches them via a laptop's webcam at Ben's house. When Alejandro and another henchman arrive, Lila asks Ben to take care of Justin while she takes care of things at home. Lila walks across the street with Eve and lights a fuse at Eve's urging. When Eve tells her that she cannot stop it, Lila throws herself into the blast. Lila is blown onto the front yard, and the house burns as Ben arrives to take care of her.

Detective Holliston fails to convince his partner, Detective Skaketti, that Lila is responsible. Undeterred, Holliston approaches Lila at a support meeting once she is released from the hospital. When Holliston threatens to take in Ben and Justin if she does not cooperate, the other mothers, who have collected donations to assist Lila, stop her from confessing and volunteer alibis. Holliston recognizes that grieving mothers are a strong alibi and leaves.

Ben says goodbye to Justin and Lila as they leave Atlanta for a new life elsewhere. As she is driving down the road, Justin asks his mother if she is okay, and she replies that she will be.

== Cast ==
- Viola Davis as Lila Walcott
- Jennifer Lopez as Eve
- Shea Whigham as Detective Holliston
- Chris Chalk as Alonzo Troys
- Julius Tennon as Ben
- Andre Royo as Detective Scaketti
- Aml Ameen as Stephon Walcott
- Yolonda Ross as Patrice
- Diarra Kilpatrick as Maya
- Ron Caldwell as Justin Walcott
- Michole Briana White as Mae
- Germaine Brooks as Donelle
- Quinton Garvin as Teo Colon
- Teddy Williams as Leo Colon
- Gino Vento as Aza Colon
- David De Vries as Police Chief Parker
- Will Brittain as Bradley
- Rey Hernandez as Ojeda

== Production ==
In December 2013, Jennifer Lopez and Viola Davis joined together to star in the independent drama Lila & Eve. On 23 January 2014, Yolonda Ross joined the cast of the film, as a member of a "Mothers of Lost Children" support group, which helps women who have lost children to violence. On 27 January 2014, Lifetime Films (the motion picture division of the Lifetime TV channel) and A+E Studios signed on to produce the film along with JuVee Productions and ChickFlick Productions. On 6 February 2014, Aml Ameen joined the cast of the film, as Lila's older son, Stephon.

=== Filming ===
Filming began on January 21, 2014, in Atlanta, Georgia.

== Release ==
=== Theatrical ===
Lila & Eve premiered on January 30, 2015, at the Sundance Film Festival in Utah. On February 26, 2015, Samuel Goldwyn Films acquired the North American rights to the film. The film was released in the United States on 17 July 2015, in a limited release and through video on demand.

== Reception ==
=== Critical response ===
Lila & Eve received generally mixed reviews from critics. Review aggregator Rotten Tomatoes reports that 35% of critics have given the film positive reviews and a rating average of 4.8/10 based on 34 reviews. The site's consensus reads, "Lila & Eve gets some mileage out of its formidable stars, with Viola Davis in particular proving that she will commandingly commit to any material, but this is a revenge flick served stale due to a lackluster script." On Metacritic the film holds an average rating of 45 based on 16 reviews.

Film critic Michael Rechtshaffen of the Los Angeles Times wrote: "Lila & Eve is a standard-issue female vigilante thriller that's skillfully elevated by the performances of leads Viola Davis and Jennifer Lopez." Dann Gire from The Daily Herald wrote that the empathy from Viola Davis elevates the film.
