= NAACP Theatre Award – Spirit Award =

Award honoring outstanding people of color in theater

The Spirit Award is an honorary award, one of the NAACP Theatre Awards, an American award scheme run by the NAACP to honor outstanding people of color in theater.

The Spirit Award is presented to an individual who is judged by NAACP members to bring energy, tenacity, innovation, commitment, talent, and of course, spirit, to the theater scene.

== Award winners ==
NAACP Theatre Award – Spirit Award
| Year | Honoree |
| 1991 | |
| 1992 | |
| 1993 | |
| 1994 | |
| 1995 | |
| 1996 | |
| 1997 | |
| 1998 | |
| 1999 | |
| 2000 | |
| 2001 | |
| 2002 | |
| 2003 | |
| 2004 | |
| 2005 | |
| 2006 | Heavy D |
| 2007 | Usher |
| 2008 | Vivica A. Fox |
| 2009 | Tichina Arnold |
| 2010 | Ashanti |
| 2024 | Myles Frost |
