= Fences (film) =

2016 film by Denzel Washington

- Theatrical release poster
- Directed by: Denzel Washington
- Screenplay by: August Wilson
- Based on: Fences by August Wilson
- Produced by: Scott Rudin; Todd Black; Denzel Washington
- Starring: Denzel Washington; Viola Davis; Stephen McKinley Henderson; Jovan Adepo; Russell Hornsby; Mykelti Williamson; Saniyya Sidney
- Cinematography: Charlotte Bruus Christensen
- Edited by: Hughes Winborne
- Music by: Marcelo Zarvos
- Production companies: Bron Creative; Macro Media; Scott Rudin Productions; Escape Artists
- Distributed by: Paramount Pictures
- Release dates: December 15, 2016 (Curran Theatre); December 16, 2016 (United States)
- Running time: 138 minutes
- Country: United States
- Language: English
- Budget: $24 million
- Box office: $64.4 million

Fences is a 2016 American period drama film directed and co-produced by Denzel Washington from a screenplay by August Wilson, based on his 1985 play. It stars Washington, Viola Davis, Stephen McKinley Henderson, Jovan Adepo, Russell Hornsby, Mykelti Williamson, and Saniyya Sidney. It follows a working-class African-American father who tries to raise his family in the 1950s, while coming to terms with the events of his life.

The film was theatrically released in the United States on December 16, 2016, by Paramount Pictures. It grossed over $64.4 million worldwide against a $24 million budget. It received widespread critical acclaim, with particular praise for Davis' performance, Wilson's screenplay, and Washington's performance and direction. It was chosen by the American Film Institute as one of the top ten films of 2016. The film earned four nominations, including Best Picture, Best Actor (for Washington), and Best Adapted Screenplay (for Wilson), at the 89th Academy Awards, with Davis winning Best Supporting Actress. At the 23rd Screen Actors Guild Awards, Washington and Davis won Outstanding Performance by a Male Actor in a Leading Role and Outstanding Performance by a Female Actor in a Supporting Role, respectively. Davis also won at the 74th Golden Globe Awards and the 70th British Academy Film Awards.

== Plot ==
In 1957 Pittsburgh, Troy Maxson lives in a modest house with his wife, Rose, and their teenage son, Cory. He works as a garbage collector alongside his best friend, Jim Bono, whom he has known for decades. Troy left home at 14 after standing up to his abusive father, becoming a robber to survive on his own. While serving time for killing a man during a robbery, he met Bono and showed himself to be a talented baseball player. He played well in the Negro leagues, but never made it to the major leagues because the color barrier was not broken until he was past his prime. A gifted storyteller, Troy claims to have survived near-fatal pneumonia as a young man by defeating Death in a wrestling match.

Troy's younger brother, Gabriel, sustained a head injury in World War II that left him mentally impaired, and Troy used the $3,000 government payout that Gabe received as the down payment for his house. As Gabriel recently moved out to rent a room elsewhere, Troy no longer gets rent money from Gabriel and is under increased financial strain. Gabriel sometimes gets in trouble with the law for his erratic behavior, so Rose suggests to Troy that Gabriel might be better off residing in a psychiatric hospital. Lyons, Troy's son from a previous relationship, visits Troy on payday to borrow money, which upsets Troy, as he believes a man has a responsibility to work hard to find his own way and provide for his family.

Rose tells Troy that Cory is being scouted by a college football team, but Troy refuses to sign the paperwork, saying he does not want Cory to pursue a career in athletics, only to be held back due to discrimination, like he did. The father and son have a distant relationship, seemingly doing little together other than building a fence around the backyard for Rose on Saturdays. When he discovers Cory has switched from a weekday-evening to a weekend shift at the A&P because of football practice, Troy demands that he switch back. He later finds out that Cory did not return to the job, so he tells the football coach that Cory is no longer allowed to play. Cory lashes out, throwing his helmet at Troy, and Troy warns his son that this is "strike one".

After complaining about his company's racist employment practices, Troy is promoted to a garbage truck driver, becoming the first African-American to do so in Pittsburgh. Bono suspects that Troy is cheating on Rose with Alberta, a woman he met at Taylor's bar, and encourages him to break it off. Troy repeatedly denies the affair, only admitting it to Bono and then Rose after he has gotten Alberta pregnant. He and Rose argue, and, when he aggressively grabs Rose's arm, Cory pushes him away, giving him "strike two".

Troy and Rose continue to live in the same house, but are estranged. Gabriel is sent to live in a hospital. Alberta dies during childbirth, greatly upsetting Troy, who yells to Death that their fight is just between the two of them. He brings the baby, Raynell, home, and Rose agrees to raise the girl as her own, but refuses to accept Troy back into her life.

Cory is considering enlisting in the Marines, having missed his opportunity to attend college. One day, when he returns home, an intoxicated and bitter Troy blocks his path and instigates a fight. When Cory swings a baseball bat at Troy, Troy overpowers Cory and kicks him out of the house. Disoriented, Troy once again challenges Death to come for him.

Six years later, Troy dies of a heart attack. Cory, now a corporal in the Marines, returns home, but informs Rose that he has decided not to go to the funeral. Rose is upset and says that, while Troy had many flaws, he tried to do the best he could as a father. Cory reconsiders after sharing memories of Troy with Raynell, whom he has not seen since she was a baby. Lyons is serving time in prison for forgery, but gets a furlough to attend the funeral, and Gabriel is released from the hospital as well. Before departing for the cemetery, Gabriel says it is time to tell Saint Peter to open the gates of Heaven for Troy. In the backyard, he attempts to play his trumpet, failing at first, but succeeding on his third try. The Sun comes out from behind the clouds and shines on Troy's family.

== Cast ==
- Denzel Washington as Troy Maxson
- Viola Davis as Rose Lee Maxson
- Stephen McKinley Henderson as Jim Bono
- Jovan Adepo as Cory Maxson
- Russell Hornsby as Lyons Maxson
- Mykelti Williamson as Gabriel Maxson
- Saniyya Sidney as Raynell Maxson

== Production ==
=== Development and casting ===
The film was adapted from August Wilson's play Fences. It was released over a decade after Wilson's death in 2005.

Previous attempts to adapt Fences for the screen had been fruitless, partly due to Wilson's insistence on an African-American director. In a 2013 interview with Empire, Denzel Washington expressed his intention to star in and direct an adaptation of Fences, reprising his Tony Award-winning performance from the 2010 Broadway revival of the play, which was produced by Scott Rudin.

On January 28, 2016, it was reported that Rudin, Washington, and Todd Black would produce a film adaptation of the play, directed by Washington and starring Washington and Viola Davis, who had also won a Tony for her performance in the 2010 revival of the play. Playwright and screenwriter Tony Kushner came aboard to build on a draft written by Wilson before his death. However, Wilson is the only credited screenwriter of the film, while Kushner received a co-producer credit. Black explained that Washington insisted they remain faithful to Wilson's work, saying: "The star of the movie is the screenplay and August Wilson's words. What Denzel said to me, to Scott, to all the actors, the cinematographer, and the production designer was, 'Don't make any decision without August Wilson's words leading you to make that decision.' Whatever you do, let the words inform your decision first. That's what we all had to abide by." Washington also said: "August Wilson wrote a masterpiece. It works on the stage and it works on film. I was determined; I had decided. I was going to film what he wrote. There are a lot of different versions of it, and I had to work through this and that, and boil it back down to what he wrote."

On April 4, 2016, it was announced that Mykelti Williamson, Russell Hornsby, Stephen McKinley Henderson, Jovan Adepo, and Saniyya Sidney joined the cast of the film, with Williamson, Hornsby, and Henderson all reprising their Broadway roles.

=== Filming and post-production ===
On April 25, 2016, it was reported that Fences had begun filming in the Hill District of Pittsburgh. Principal photography was completed on June 14, and post-production was completed in mid-November. Charlotte Bruus Christensen was the director of photography, David Gropman was the production designer, Sharen Davis was the costume designer, Hughes Winborne was the editor, Sean Devereaux was the visual effects supervisor, and Marcelo Zarvos composed the film's score.

== Release ==
Fences had its world premiere at the Curran Theatre in San Francisco, California, on December 15, 2016. It began a limited release the next day, before opening wide on December 25. In the United States, the Motion Picture Association rated the film PG-13 "for thematic elements, language and some suggestive references".

== Home media ==
The film was released on Digital HD on February 24, 2017, and on Blu-ray and DVD on March 14.

== Reception ==
=== Box office ===
Fences grossed $57.7 million in the United States and Canada, and $6.7 million in other territories, for a worldwide total of $64.4 million.

The film was expected to bring in $50–75,000 per theater over its limited opening weekend at five theaters in New York and Los Angeles; it ended up grossing a total of $128,000, for a per-theater average of $32,000. It earned $6.7 million the first day of its wide release in 2,223 theaters, and $11.5 million over its first two days. Over its first full weekend in wide release (it opened wide on Christmas, which was a Sunday), the film made $10 million, finishing 6th at the box office.

=== Critical response ===
On the review aggregator website Rotten Tomatoes, 92% of 273 critics' reviews are positive, with an average rating of 7.6/10. The website's consensus reads: "From its reunited Broadway stars to its screenplay, the solidly crafted Fences finds its Pulitzer-winning source material fundamentally unchanged — and still just as powerful." Metacritic, which uses a weighted average, assigned the film a score of 79 out of 100, based on 48 critics, indicating "generally favorable" reviews. Audiences polled by CinemaScore gave the film an average grade of "A−" on an A+ to F scale.

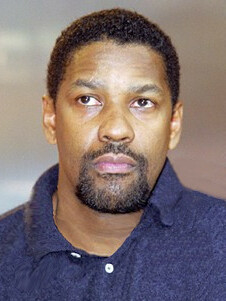
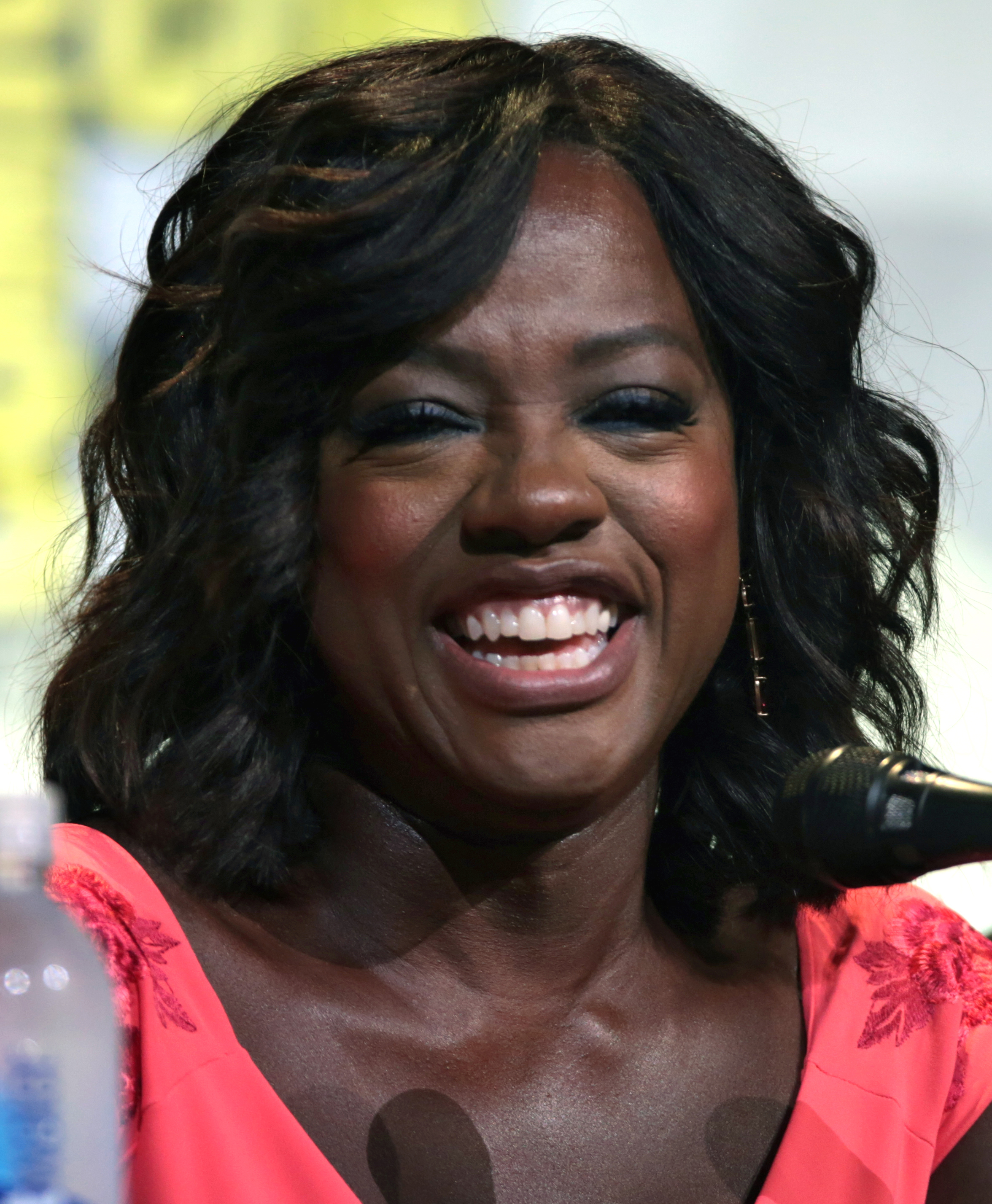
The performances of Denzel Washington and Viola Davis garnered widespread critical acclaim, earning them Academy Award nominations for Best Actor and Best Supporting Actress respectively, with Davis winning.

A. O. Scott of The New York Times stated, "But even as it properly foregrounds Wilson's dialogue — few playwrights have approached his genius for turning workaday vernacular into poetry — Fences is much more than a filmed reading. […] If the sound were to suddenly fail — or if the dialogue were dubbed into Martian — the impact of the performances would still be palpable." Kenneth Turan of the Los Angeles Times highlighted Davis' performance, commenting that "When the camera is on her no one will be wanting to look elsewhere. Davis' delivery of Fences' signature speech about her own hopes and dreams is flat-out extraordinary."

Ty Burr of The Boston Globe wrote, "You don't get groundbreaking cinema from Fences, but what you do get – two titanic performances and an immeasurable American drama – makes up for that." Catherine Shoard of The Guardian gave the film 4 out of 5 stars and praised the performances of Washington and Davis, titling her review: "Denzel Washington and Viola Davis set to convert Tonys to Oscars". Terrl White of Empire gave the film a full 5 stars, calling it "A simply extraordinary film without crashes, bangs and wallops but full of towering performances delivered with intelligence, power and heart." Owen Gleiberman of Variety also gave a positive review that praised the performances, writing: "The acting is all superb."

In a negative review, David Edelstein of New York Magazine opined, "The movie is pitched in an unfortunate place. It's not cinematic enough to make you forget you're watching something conceived for another, more spatially constricted medium, but it's too cinematic to capture the intensity, the concentration, of a great theatrical event."

== See also ==
- Second weekend in box office performance § Second-weekend increase
- List of black films of the 2010s
