= Fences (play) =

1985 American drama play

- Original language: English
- Written by: August Wilson
- Characters: Troy Maxson; Rose Maxson; Cory Maxson; Jim Bono; Gabriel Maxson; Lyons Maxson; Raynell Maxson
- Series: The Pittsburgh Cycle
- Subject: A Negro baseball league player is now a garbageman; his bitterness affects his loved ones
- Genre: Drama, Fiction
- Setting: 1957, in a backyard of a house in Pittsburgh, Pennsylvania

Premiere
- Date: 1985
- Place: Eugene O'Neill Theater Center; Waterford, Connecticut

Fences is a 1985 play by the American playwright August Wilson. Set in the 1950s, it is the sixth in Wilson's ten-part "Pittsburgh Cycle". Like all of the "Pittsburgh" plays, Fences explores the evolving African-American experience and examines race relations, among other themes. The play won the 1987 Pulitzer Prize for Drama and the 1987 Tony Award for Best Play. It was also included by Harold Bloom in his list of essential works constituting the Western Canon. Fences was first developed at the Eugene O'Neill Theater Center's 1983 National Playwrights Conference and premiered at the Yale Repertory Theatre in 1985.

== Plot ==
The focus of Wilson's attention in Fences is Troy, a 53-year-old, African American working-class head of household who struggles with providing for his family. The play takes place in Pittsburgh, Pennsylvania; although never officially named, it makes mention of several key locations in Pittsburgh. In his younger days, Troy was an excellent player in Negro league baseball and continued practicing baseball while serving time in prison for a murder he had committed during a robbery. Because the color barrier had not yet been broken in Major League Baseball, Troy was unable to get into the MLB to make good money or to save for the future. He now lives a menial, though respectable, blue-collar life of trash collecting; later in the play, he remarkably crosses the race barrier and becomes the first black truck driver in Pittsburgh instead of just a barrel lifter.

Troy lives with his wife, Rose, and their teenage son, Cory. He has a younger brother, Gabe, a World War II veteran whose war injury to his head has caused him noticeable psychological damage. Gabe had received $3,000 from the government, and Troy took control of this money to purchase a home for his family, including a room for Gabe. A short time before the play's opening, Gabriel has rented a room elsewhere, but still in the neighborhood. Lyons is Troy's older son from a previous marriage, and lives outside the home. Bono is Troy's best friend and co-worker.

The play begins on payday, with Troy and Bono drinking and talking. Troy's character is revealed through his speech about how he went up to their boss, Mr. Rand, and asked why African-American men are not allowed to drive garbage trucks; Rose and Lyons join in the conversation. Lyons, a musician, has come to borrow money from Troy, confident that he will receive it, and promises to pay him back because his girlfriend Bonnie just got a job. Troy, who is a rigid believer in hard work and responsibility, belittles his son because he refuses to find a real job, as Troy did, rather than pursuing his dream of becoming a musician.

Cory tells Troy and Rose about an opportunity for a college football scholarship. Troy tells Cory he will not let his son play football for fear of racial discrimination, as Troy believes he experienced when he wanted a career in the major leagues. It is suggested later on that Troy told Cory's coach that his son is no longer able to play football. When Cory discovers this, he and Troy get into a fight, resulting in Troy sending Cory to his room. Later, it is revealed that Troy's age after serving a prison sentence, not his race, may have been the primary factor in his inability to join the major leagues. Father and son argue about Troy's actions, but Troy stubbornly does not back down from his argument and kicks Cory out of the house.

After a talk with Bono, Troy admits to Rose that he has been having an affair and that his mistress Alberta is pregnant. Six months later, Alberta dies in childbirth, and Troy brings his baby daughter Raynell home. Rose agrees to raise the girl as her own and remains in the family home, but the couple are estranged; she refuses to accept Troy back into her life, saying: "From right now... this child got a mother. But you a womanless man." Troy becomes more of a drunkard while Rose enjoys some personal freedom in attending church with baby Raynell.

Seven years later, Troy has died. Cory comes home for a visit from the military where he is a corporal in the Marines. Lyons is in prison for cashing other people's checks and Gabriel has been institutionalized but they both are allowed to leave for the day to attend Troy's funeral. Cory initially refuses to go to the funeral due to long-standing resentment, but he is convinced by his mother to pay his respects to his father — the man who, though hard-headed and often poor at demonstrating affection, nevertheless loved his son. Raynell and Cory bond over a song that Troy used to sing about his old dog named Blue. The family say their farewells to Troy and offer forgiveness that may not be fully deserved.

=== Allegories ===
The brother Gabriel is potentially an allegory to salvation. Other than being actually named Gabriel, like the angel, Gabe wears a trumpet, constantly chases away unseen "hellhounds", and regularly believes himself to be speaking with Saint Peter. At the end, just before Troy's funeral, the family gathers around Gabe in the yard. He blows three times into his trumpet, but no sound comes out. In a moment of trance, Gabe begins to dance and sing. The sun breaks through the clouds while the family looks on. Troy is at last delivered and the rest of the family is too; each seeming to find peace in their relationship with Troy.

The fence referred to by the play's title is built over many years and is revealed to be finished only in the final act of the play. It is not obvious as to why Troy wants to build it, but a dramatic monologue in the second act shows how he conceptualizes it as an allegory — to keep the Grim Reaper away. The fence is also symbolic of the emotional barrier that Troy erected between himself and his sons, one from each of his adult relationships. Rose also wanted Troy to build the fence as a symbolic means of securing what was her own, keeping what belonged inside (in her family), and making what should stay outside, stay out. It also refers to hitting a home run in baseball, ie "swinging for the fences," attempting the supreme achievement in baseball.

== Productions ==
Fences was first developed at the Eugene O'Neill Theater Center's 1983 National Playwrights Conference.

It premiered at the Yale Repertory Theatre in 1985, under the direction of Lloyd Richards (who was then Artistic Director of the Yale Rep), with a cast of James Earl Jones (Troy Maxson), Mary Alice (Rose), Ray Aranha (Jim Bono), Russell Costen (Gabriel), and Courtney B. Vance (Cory).

The play's first Broadway production was staged at the 46th Street Theatre on March 26, 1987, and closed on June 26, 1988, after 525 performances and 11 previews. Directed by Lloyd Richards, the first Broadway cast remained largely the same as that of the Yale Rep premiere: James Earl Jones (Troy Maxson), Mary Alice (Rose), Ray Aranha (Jim Bono), Frankie Faison (Gabriel), and Courtney B. Vance (Cory). The production won the Tony Awards for Best Play, Best Performance by a Leading Actor in a Play (James Earl Jones), Best Performance by a Featured Actress in a Play (Mary Alice), and Best Direction of a Play (Lloyd Richards), as well as the Drama Desk Awards for Outstanding New Play, Outstanding Actor in a Play (Jones), and Outstanding Featured Actress in a Play (Alice). It also received Tony Award nominations for Best Featured Actor in a Play (Faison and Vance).

The first Broadway revival of the play opened at the Cort Theatre on April 26, 2010, with a limited 13-week engagement. Directed by Kenny Leon, the production starred Denzel Washington (Troy Maxson) and Viola Davis (Rose) as the married couple struggling with changing U.S. race relations. The revival was nominated for 10 Tony Awards, winning three for Best Revival of a Play, Best Actor in a Play (Denzel Washington), and Best Actress in a Play (Viola Davis).

In August 1990, the play received its premiere production in the UK by Liverpool Playhouse in association with West End producer, Bill Kenwright, in a production by Temba Theatre Company's artistic director, Alby James, starring Hollywood movie star Yaphet Kotto as the protagonist Troy Maxson, and coming star, Adrian Lester, as his son, Cory. Financial Times critic Alastair Macaulay wrote: "Congratulations to the Liverpool Playhouse for presenting this, its British premiere, and for doing it proud...' and 'The director Alby James has done wonders in making his largely English cast absolutely persuasive as these Americans."

In 2013, the play was revived again in the UK by Theatre Royal Bath, starring Lenny Henry as Troy Maxson and directed by Paulette Randall. This production transferred to the Duchess Theatre in London's West End for a run that lasted between June and September 2013. Henry's performance attracted wide acclaim. Giles Broadbent from the Wharf said, “Lenny Henry is immense.” Charles Spencer from The Telegraph said of Henry: "He is, and I don’t use the word lightly, magnificent." Jane Shilling, also from the Telegraph said: "What you don’t expect is to find Henry entirely unrecognisable in the physically and morally immense character he embodies." Best of Theatre said: "You may love or loathe his comedy but it is impossible to deny Lenny Henry's determination to become a serious actor of some note." Paul Taylor from The Independent said, “the performance cements Henry's status as a serious actor.” Henry Hitchings from the London Evening Standard said, "He's on superb form". Simon Edge from the Express said, "Henry gives a perfectly controlled performance, combining physical poise with an armoury of carefully judged vocal ticks and facial mannerisms." Of the production as a whole, Hitchings commented that "Fences is dense and unsettling. It's brave to programme such a meaty, daunting piece during the summer months". Camilla Gurlter from A Younger Theatre described it as “very heavy and with its nearly three hours of lost hope and broken dreams it can feel long and depressing".

The play was revived in 2026 by The Old Globe Theatre, starring Dorian Missick as Troy Maxson, De’Adre Aziza as Rose, and Omari K. Chancellor as Cory. Directed by Delicia Turner Sonnenberg, this production, particularly Missick's turn as Troy, was met with great acclaim.

== Cast and characters ==
Characters	Original 1987 Broadway cast	2010 Broadway revival
Troy Maxson	James Earl Jones	Denzel Washington
Rose Maxson	Mary Alice	Viola Davis
Jim Bono	Ray Aranha	Stephen McKinley Henderson
Cory Maxson	Courtney B. Vance	Chris Chalk
Lyons Maxson	Charles Brown	Russell Hornsby
Gabriel Maxson	Frankie Faison	Mykelti Williamson
Raynell Maxson	Karima Miller	Eden Duncan-Smith; SaCha Stewart-Coleman

== Awards and nominations ==
=== Original Broadway production ===
Year	Award	Category	Nominee(s)	Result	Ref.
1987	Tony Awards	Best Play	August Wilson	Won	
1987	Tony Awards	Best Leading Actor in a Play	James Earl Jones	Won	
1987	Tony Awards	Best Featured Actor in a Play	Frankie Faison	Nominated	
1987	Tony Awards	Best Featured Actor in a Play	Courtney B. Vance	Nominated	
1987	Tony Awards	Best Featured Actress in a Play	Mary Alice	Won	
1987	Tony Awards	Best Direction of a Play	Lloyd Richards	Won	
1987	Drama Desk Awards	Outstanding Play	August Wilson	Won	
1987	Drama Desk Awards	Outstanding Actor in a Play	James Earl Jones	Won	
1987	Drama Desk Awards	Outstanding Featured Actor in a Play	Frankie R. Faison	Nominated	
1987	Drama Desk Awards	Outstanding Featured Actress in a Play	Mary Alice	Won	
1987	Drama Desk Awards	Outstanding Director of a Play	Lloyd Richards	Nominated	
1987	Pulitzer Prize	Drama	August Wilson	Won	
1987	Theatre World Awards		Courtney B. Vance	Won	

=== 2010 Broadway revival ===
Year	Award	Category	Nominee(s)	Result	Ref.
2010	Tony Awards	Best Revival of a Play		Won	
2010	Tony Awards	Best Leading Actor in a Play	Denzel Washington	Won	
2010	Tony Awards	Best Leading Actress in a Play	Viola Davis	Won	
2010	Tony Awards	Best Featured Actor in a Play	Stephen McKinley Henderson	Nominated	
2010	Tony Awards	Best Direction of a Play	Kenny Leon	Nominated	
2010	Tony Awards	Best Original Score	Branford Marsalis	Nominated	
2010	Tony Awards	Best Scenic Design in a Play	Santo Loquasto	Nominated	
2010	Tony Awards	Best Costume Design in a Play	Constanza Romero	Nominated	
2010	Tony Awards	Best Lighting Design in a Play	Brian MacDevitt	Nominated	
2010	Tony Awards	Best Sound Design in a Play	Acme Sound Partners	Nominated	
2010	Drama Desk Awards	Outstanding Revival of a Play		Won (Note: Tied with A View from the Bridge.)	
2010	Drama Desk Awards	Outstanding Featured Actor in a Play	Chris Chalk	Nominated	
2010	Drama Desk Awards	Outstanding Featured Actress in a Play	Viola Davis	Won (Note: Tied with Frances de la Tour for The History Boys.)	
2010	Drama Desk Awards	Outstanding Music in a Play	Branford Marsalis	Won	
2010	Theatre World Awards		Chris Chalk	Won	

== Film adaptation ==
A film adaptation of Fences, directed by Denzel Washington, and starring Washington and Viola Davis reprising their roles from the 2010 Broadway revival, completed production in 2016. The film was released nationally on December 25, 2016, in the U.S. and was released on February 3, 2017, in the UK. The film was chosen by the American Film Institute as one of the top ten films of 2016, and has been nominated for numerous awards, including four Oscar nominations at the 89th Academy Awards: Best Picture, Best Actor (Washington), Best Supporting Actress (Davis), and Best Adapted Screenplay, with Davis winning for her performance. It also received a Golden Globe nomination for Best Actor for Washington and a Best Supporting Actress win for Davis.
