= Viola Davis =

American actress and producer (born 1965)

- Davis in 2026
- Born: August 11, 1965 (age 61); St. Matthews, South Carolina, U.S.
- Education: Rhode Island College (BA); Juilliard School (BFA)
- Occupations: Actress; producer
- Years active: 1988–present
- Works: Full list
- Spouse: Julius Tennon (m. 2003)
- Children: 1
- Relatives: Mike Colter (second cousin)
- Awards: Full list

Viola Davis (/vaɪˈoʊlə/ vy-OH-lə; born August 11, 1965) is an American actress and film producer. Her accolades include both the Triple Crown of Acting and EGOT. (Note: Davis is the third performer, after Helen Hayes and Rita Moreno, to achieve both statuses.) Time named her one of the 100 most influential people in the world in 2012 and 2017. The New York Times ranked her ninth on its list of the greatest actors of the 21st century (2020). Davis received the Cecil B. DeMille Award at the 2025 Golden Globe Awards.

A graduate of Juilliard, Davis began her career in Central Falls, Rhode Island, appearing in small stage productions. She made her Broadway debut in the August Wilson play Seven Guitars (1996) for which she earned her first Tony nomination. She would later win two Tony Awards, both for Wilson plays. Her first win was for Best Featured Actress in a Play for the role of Tonya, a woman grappling with trauma and loss in King Hedley II (2001), followed by her second win for Best Actress in a Play for the role of Rose Maxson, a working class mother in Fences (2010).

She won the Academy Award for Best Supporting Actress for reprising her role in the 2016 film adaptation of Fences. She was Oscar-nominated for playing a complex mother in Doubt (2008), a 1960s housemaid in The Help (2011), and Ma Rainey in Ma Rainey's Black Bottom (2020). On television, she became the first black actress to win the Primetime Emmy Award for Outstanding Lead Actress in a Drama Series for her role as lawyer Annalise Keating in the ABC legal drama series How to Get Away with Murder (2014–2020). Davis joined the DC Extended Universe playing Amanda Waller starting with Suicide Squad (2016) to Black Adam (2022). She reprises her role in the rebooted DC Universe. She has also starred in the crime drama Widows (2018), and historical action film The Woman King (2022).

Davis and her husband are founders of the production company JuVee Productions, and she is also widely recognized for her advocacy and support for human rights and women of color. She became a L'Oréal Paris ambassador in 2019. The audiobook narration of her 2022 memoir Finding Me won her the Grammy Award for Best Audio Book, Narration & Storytelling Recording.

== Early life and education ==
Davis was born on August 11, 1965, in St. Matthews, South Carolina, to Mae Alice Davis (née Logan) and Dan Davis. She was born on her grandmother's farm on the Singleton Plantation. Her father was a horse trainer, and her mother was a maid, factory worker and homemaker. She is the second youngest of six children, having four sisters and a brother. Soon after she was born, her parents moved with Davis and two of her older siblings to Central Falls, Rhode Island, a suburb of Providence. Her other siblings were left with her grandparents.

Her mother was also an activist during the Civil Rights Movement. When she was two years old, Davis was taken to jail with her mother after she was arrested during a civil rights protest. She has described herself as having "lived in abject poverty and dysfunction" during her childhood, recalling living in "rat-infested and condemned" apartments. Davis is a second cousin of actor Mike Colter, known for portraying the Marvel Comics character Luke Cage.

Davis attended Central Falls High School, the alma mater to which she partially credits her love of stage acting with her involvement in the arts. As a teenager, she was involved in the federal TRIO Upward Bound and TRIO Student Support Services programs. While enrolled at the Young People's School for the Performing Arts in West Warwick, Rhode Island, Davis's talent was recognized by a director at the program, Bernard Masterson. After graduating from high school, Davis studied at Rhode Island College, majoring in theater and participating in the National Student Exchange before graduating in 1988.

Next, she attended the Juilliard School of Performing Arts in New York City for four years, and was a member of the school's Drama Division "Group 22" (1989–93). In a 2025 interview, Davis said that her education at Juilliard helped her become a better "white actress" but not necessarily a better actor. She explained that the formal technical training she received helped her play classic roles from Shakespeare, Chekhov, O'Neill, and Strindberg, but added "what it denies is the human being behind all that, and as a black actress I'm always asked to show range by doing white work." She noted that "I can do the best that I can with Tennessee Williams but he writes for fragile white women. Beautiful work, but it's not me." She opined that black playwrights such as August Wilson and Lorraine Hansberry aren't studied in the same way as the others she had learned from.

== Career ==
=== Early work and breakthrough on stage (1992–1999) ===
In 1992, Davis starred in her first professional stage role, an off Broadway production of William Shakespeare's comedy As You Like It as Denis alongside Elizabeth McGovern at the Delacorte Theatre. In 1996, Davis made her Broadway debut in the original Broadway production of August Wilson's Seven Guitars as Vera, alongside Keith David. The play opened on Broadway on March 6 at the Walter Kerr Theatre. She earned critical praise for her performance. That same year, Davis received her Screen Actors Guild card in 1996 for doing one day of work, playing a nurse who passes a vial of blood to future How to Get Away with Murder co-star Timothy Hutton in the film The Substance of Fire (1996). She was paid $518. Davis continued acting off Broadway in various productions, and appeared in bit parts on television including episodes of NYPD Blue (1996), and New York Undercover (1996). She also appeared in the HBO television military comedy film, The Pentagon Wars (1996) starring Kelsey Grammer, and Cary Elwes. In 1998, she played a small role in Steven Soderbergh's crime comedy film Out of Sight (1999).

=== Film breakthrough and further stage success (2000–2010) ===
In 2001, she returned to the Broadway stage in another play by August Wilson titled King Hedley II, portraying Tonya, a "35-year-old mother fighting eloquently for the right to abort a pregnancy." Her performance earned critical attention, and she received her first Tony Award for Best Featured Actress in a Play and a Drama Desk Award. She won another Drama Desk Award for her work in a 2004 off-Broadway production of Intimate Apparel by Lynn Nottage.

Throughout the early 2000s Davis appeared in numerous films, including Soderbergh's Solaris and Traffic, as well as George Clooney's Syriana (2005), which Soderbergh produced. Hers was the uncredited voice of the parole board interrogator who questions Danny Ocean (Clooney) in the first scene in Ocean's Eleven (2001). She also gave brief performances in the romantic comedy Kate & Leopold (2001) and the drama Antwone Fisher (2002). She also played secondary roles in Todd Haynes' costume drama Far From Heaven (2002), starring Julianne Moore and Dennis Quaid. Her television work includes a recurring role in Law & Order: Special Victims Unit, starring roles in two short-lived series, Traveler and Century City, and a special guest appearance in a Law & Order: Criminal Intent episode entitled "Badge".

In 2005 and 2006, Davis began a recurring role opposite Tom Selleck in a series of films made for television based on novels by Robert B. Parker, Jesse Stone: Stone Cold, Jesse Stone: Night Passage and Jesse Stone: Death in Paradise.

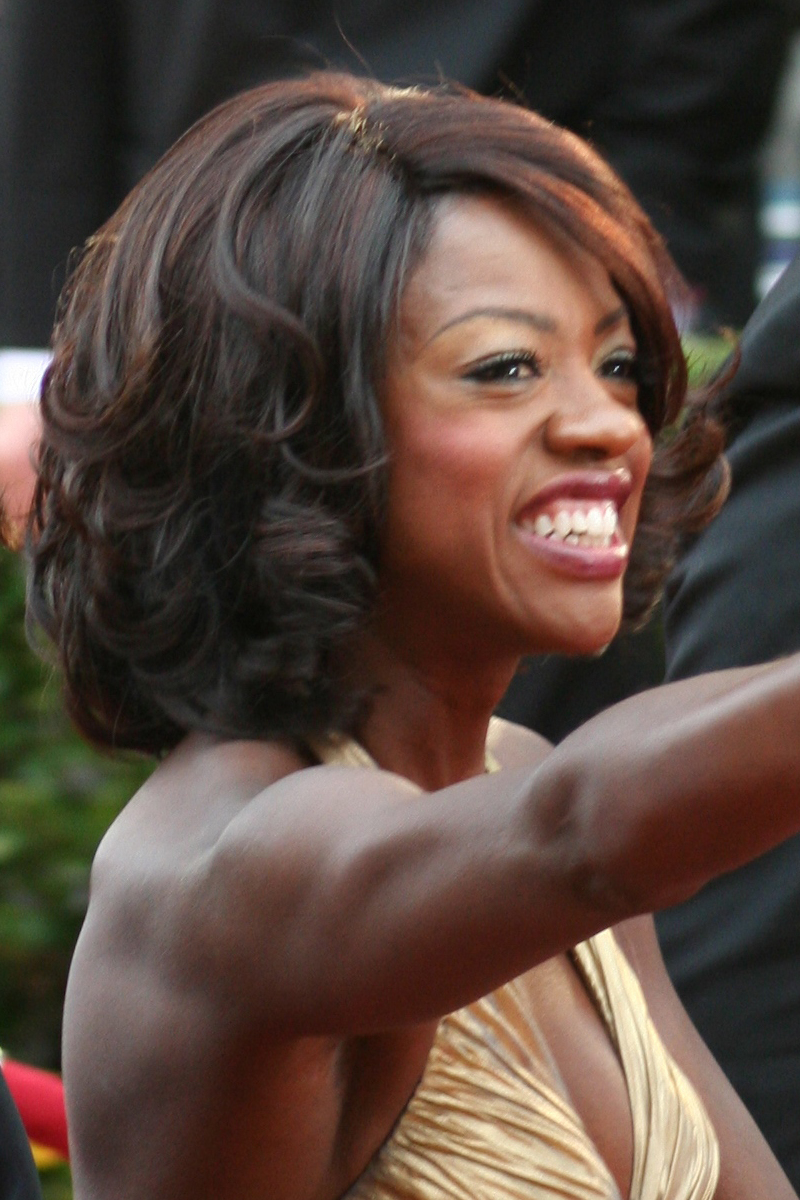
Davis at the 81st Academy Awards in 2009, where she received her first Academy Award nomination for Doubt (2008)

In 2008, Davis played Mrs. Miller in the film adaptation of the Broadway play by John Patrick Shanley, Doubt, with Meryl Streep, Philip Seymour Hoffman, and Amy Adams. Though Davis had only a few scenes in the film, she remained a highlight of the film with noted film critic Roger Ebert of the Chicago Sun-Times specifically praising her performance writing, "It lasts about 10 minutes, but it is the emotional heart and soul of Doubt, and if Viola Davis isn't nominated by the Academy, an injustice will have been done." Ebert would further go on to write, "She goes face to face with the pre-eminent film actress of this generation, and it is a confrontation of two equals that generates terrifying power." She was nominated for several awards for her performance, including the Screen Actors Guild Award, the Golden Globe Award and an Academy Award for Best Supporting Actress.

On June 30, 2009, Davis was inducted into the Academy of Motion Picture Arts and Sciences.

In 2010, Davis returned to Broadway in her third August Wilson play, this time a revival of Fences as Rose Maxson, acting alongside Denzel Washington. Her performance received raves from critics in particular theatre critic Ben Brantley of The New York Times who described Davis' performance as "extraordinary", adding "Ms. Davis, who won a Tony for her performance in Wilson's King Hedley II, may well pick up another for her work here. Her face is a poignant paradox, both bone-tired and suffused with sensual radiance." On June 13, 2010, Davis won her second Tony Award for Best Performance by a Leading Actress in a Play for her performance.

In 2010 Davis had small roles in the romantic comedy thriller Knight and Day starring Tom Cruise and Cameron Diaz and the romantic comedy Eat Pray Love starring Julia Roberts. That same year she also played the role of Dr. Minerva in It's Kind of a Funny Story (2010), a coming-of-age film written and directed by Anna Boden with Ryan Fleck, adapted from the 2006 novel by Ned Vizzini.

=== Worldwide recognition and continued acclaim (2011–2016) ===
In August 2011, Davis starred as Aibileen Clark, a housemaid in 1960s Mississippi, in the film adaptation of Kathryn Stockett's novel The Help, directed by Tate Taylor, and co-starring alongside Emma Stone, Octavia Spencer, Bryce Dallas Howard, and Jessica Chastain. Davis described her performance in the film as channeling her mother and grandmother saying, "I feel like I brought my mom to life; I've channeled her spirit. I channeled the spirit of my grandmother, and I've kind of paid homage to how they've contributed to my life and the lives of so many people". She has since expressed deep regret over taking on the role; although she still admires the people she worked with, she does not think the story or portrayal is truthful about the lives of the black characters. Davis gained praise for her work and eventually won two Screen Actors Guild Awards, in addition to receiving her second Academy Award nomination, as well as Golden Globe Award and BAFTA Award nominations.

In 2012, Time magazine listed Davis as one of the most influential people in the world. Also in 2012, Glamour magazine named Davis Glamour's Film Actress of the year. On June 12, 2012, Davis received the Women in Film's Crystal Award. In 2014, Davis reunited with The Help director Tate Taylor in Get on Up, a biopic of James Brown, playing Brown's mother. Her daughter, Genesis, also appeared in the film.

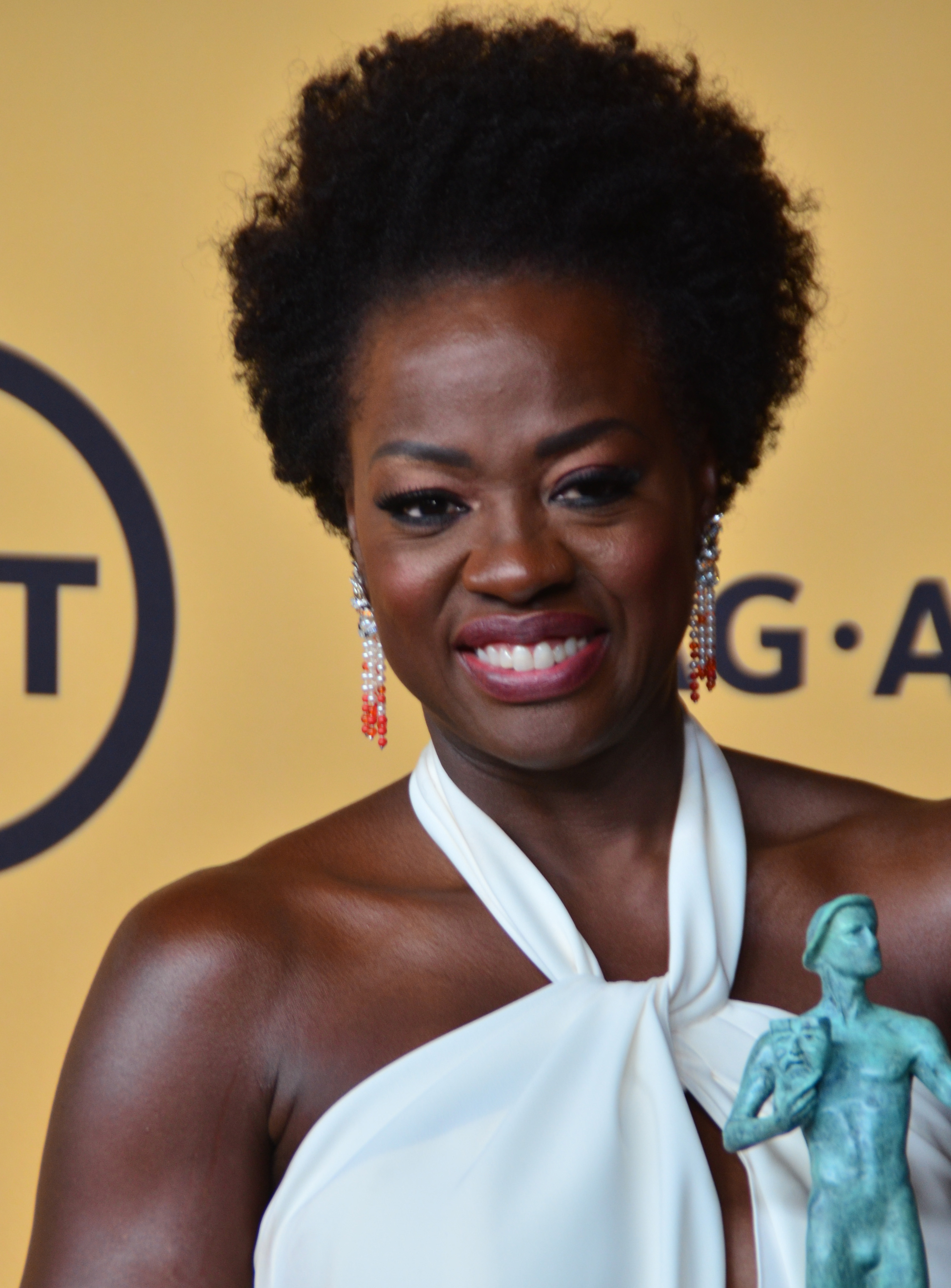
Davis at the 2015 Screen Actors Guild Awards

In February 2014, Davis was cast in Peter Nowalk's pilot How to Get Away with Murder (executive produced by Shonda Rhimes for her ShondaLand production company) as the lead character. Her character, Annalise Keating, is a tough criminal defense attorney and professor who becomes entangled in murder plot with her students. It began as a series in September 2014. In September 2015, Davis became the first African-American to win the Primetime Emmy Award for Outstanding Lead Actress in a Drama Series for her role on How to Get Away with Murder. She received a second Primetime Emmy Award nomination for the role in 2016. Davis also won two Screen Actors Guild Awards for Outstanding Performance by a Female Actor in a Drama Series in 2014 and 2015. She received nominations from the Golden Globe Awards for Best Actress – Television Series Drama and Critics' Choice Award for Best Actress in a Drama Series for her performance on the show.

In 2015, Davis appeared in Blackhat, a Michael Mann-directed thriller film starring Chris Hemsworth. Davis also served as executive-producer of the crime drama film Lila & Eve, starring herself and Jennifer Lopez in the titular roles. In 2016, Davis starred in the courtroom drama Custody, on which she also served as an executive producer, and played Amanda Waller in the film Suicide Squad, an adaptation of a DC Comics series of the same name.

In 2016, Davis reprised her role as Rose Maxson for the film adaptation of Fences directed by and starring Denzel Washington. Her performance garnered critical acclaim and she received her third Academy Award nomination, making her the first black actress in history to achieve this feat. She subsequently went on to win the Academy Award for Best Supporting Actress, the Golden Globe Award for Best Supporting Actress, the Screen Actors Guild Award for Outstanding Performance by a Female Actor in a Supporting Role, and the BAFTA Award for Best Actress in a Supporting Role.

=== Established actress (2017–present) ===
In 2017, Davis was presented with the 2,597th star on the Hollywood Walk of Fame by her Doubt co-star and friend Meryl Streep. While accepting the honor, Davis said: "It's like my life flashing before my eyes, and all I can say is, God has blessed my life in abundance." Davis was also listed among and a featured cover star of Time magazine's "100 Most Influential People" List for the second time, her first being in 2012. Streep penned the article in the magazine, referring to Davis as having "carved a place for herself on the Mount Rushmore of the 21st century", commenting that "her gifts as an artist are unassailable, undeniable, deep and rich and true. But her importance in the culture – her ability to identify it, her willingness to speak about it and take on responsibility for it – is what marks her for greatness." In March 2017, Davis was awarded the Artist of the Year Award at Harvard University.

Also in 2017, Davis announced that she would write the sequel to the classic picture book Corduroy, titled Corduroy Takes a Bow. In a press release, Davis stated that "Corduroy has always held a special place in my life, first as a child paging through it, and then again with my daughter, introducing her to the adventures of that adorable teddy bear". The book was published by Penguin Random House later in 2018.

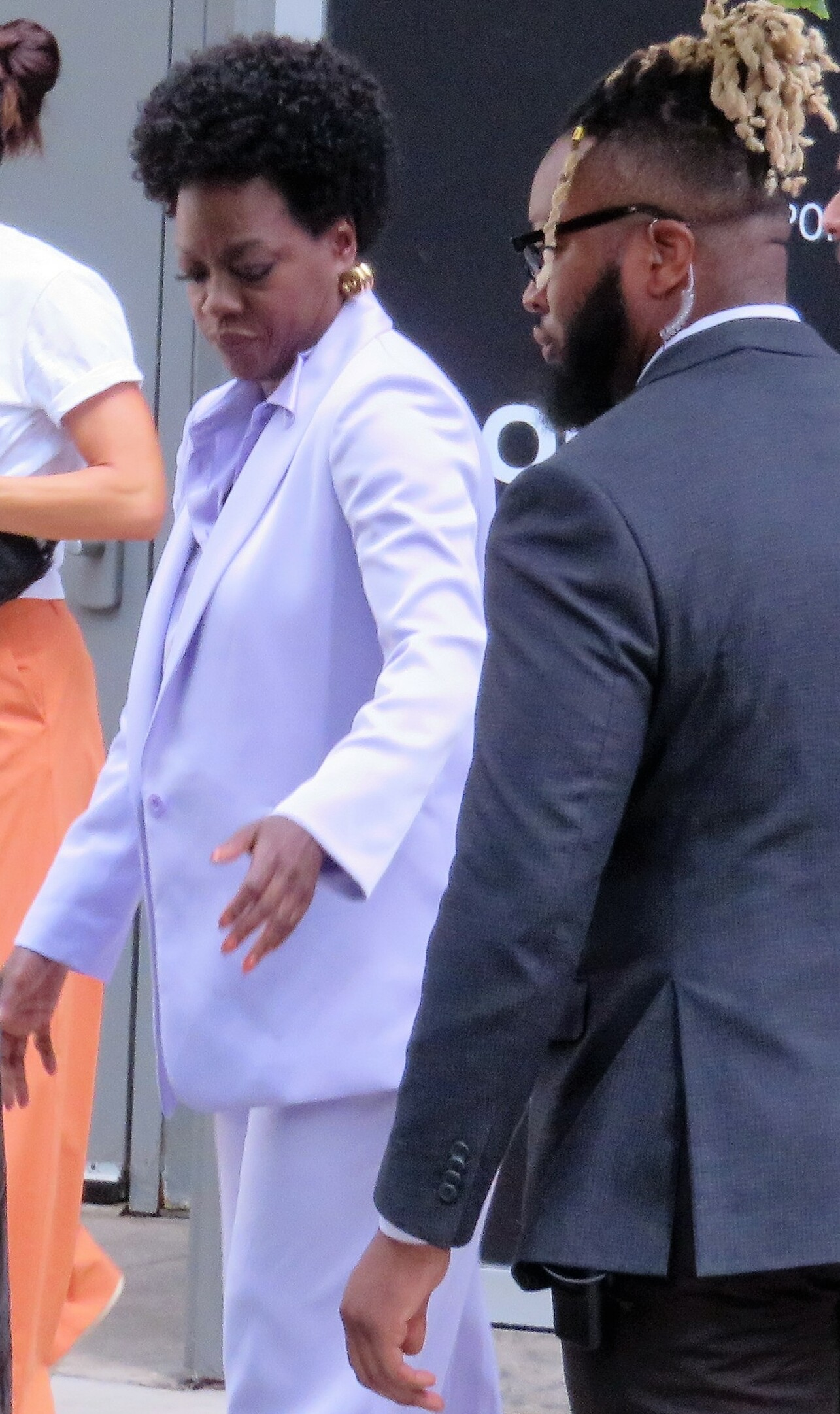
Davis in 2022

In 2018, Davis debuted Two-Sides, a documentary series exploring police brutality towards the African-American community. The series debuted on TV One, running through till mid-February. Davis also starred alongside fellow Shondaland costar Kerry Washington for a special two-hour crossover episode of How to Get Away with Murder and Scandal, aptly titled How to Get Away with Scandal. Davis's guest appearance garnered her a fourth Emmy Award nomination, and her first for Outstanding Guest Actress in a Drama Series. That same year, Davis starred in the Steve McQueen heist thriller Widows alongside Cynthia Erivo, Elizabeth Debicki, Michelle Rodriguez, and Liam Neeson. The film was an adaptation of the popular 1983 British miniseries. She received critical acclaim, with film critic Eric Kohn of IndieWire writing, that the film "largely belongs to Davis...the actress has never been more commanding". She received her second British Academy Film Award nomination for Best Actress in a Leading Role for her performance.

In 2020, Davis served as an executive producer and appeared in the documentary film Giving Voice, following students entering the August Wilson monologue competition for a chance to compete on Broadway. That same year, she starred alongside Chadwick Boseman (in his final onscreen performance) as the titular character in the biographical drama Ma Rainey's Black Bottom, based on the 1982 play of the same name and directed by George C. Wolfe. She received critical acclaim and a Screen Actors Guild Award for Outstanding Performance by a Female Actor in a Leading Role for her performance, in addition to her sixth Golden Globe Award nomination and her second Academy Award nomination for Best Actress, her fourth nomination overall. With that nomination, she became the most-nominated black actress in the history of the Academy Awards, as well as the first black actress to have been nominated for Best Actress more than once. She also appeared on the cover of the July/August 2020 issue of Vanity Fair, photographed by Dario Calmese.

In 2021, Davis reprised her role as Amanda Waller in the superhero film The Suicide Squad. Also in 2021, she appeared alongside Sandra Bullock in the drama film The Unforgivable, directed by Nora Fingscheidt. Davis appeared uncredited as Amanda Waller in two episodes, "A Whole New Whirled" and "It's Cow or Never", in season 1 of the show Peacemaker, a spin-off of The Suicide Squad, and in the film, Black Adam. Davis executive produced and played former First Lady Michelle Obama in The First Lady, a Showtime drama series. It premiered in April 2022. After receiving criticism on social media for her portrayal, Davis responded by calling the disapproval "incredibly hurtful" and saying "it is my job as a leader to make bold choices." In 2022, Davis starred in The Woman King, inspired by true events that took place within The Kingdom of Dahomey. The film tells the story of Nanisca, the general of an all-female military unit, played by Davis, and her daughter Nawi, played by Thuso Mbedu. Davis was the narrator at Disney's Candlelight Processional at Disneyland in 2022. In August 2022, it was reported that Davis was cast as Head Gamemaker Dr. Volumnia Gaul in the prequel to The Hunger Games film series, The Hunger Games: The Ballad of Songbirds and Snakes.

In March 2024, to commemorate the 65th anniversary of International Women's Day, Davis was one of a number of female celebrities that had their likeness turned into Barbie dolls. Also in March, Davis voiced the Chameleon, who was the main antagonist of Kung Fu Panda 4, the fourth installment in the eponymous franchise. In December 2024, Davis reprised her role as Amanda Waller in the animated Max TV series Creature Commandos. In 2025, Davis starred in G20, an action thriller in which she plays the U.S. president. On July 7, 2026, her company partnership with Julius Tennon, JuVee Productions, signed a first-look deal with Universal Television.

== Philanthropy and activism ==
In 2011, Davis donated funds to her hometown public library in Central Falls, Rhode Island, to assist in preventing its closure due to a lack of city funding. In 2018, Davis donated funds to her alma mater, Central Falls High School, for its theater program.

Since 2014, Davis has collaborated with the Hunger Is campaign to help eradicate childhood hunger across America. Speaking on her work, Davis said that "seventeen million kids in this country, so one in five kids in this country, go to bed hungry. I was one of those kids, because I grew up in abject poverty; I did everything that you could possibly imagine to get food: I rummaged in the garbage cans, I stole from the local store constantly." As an honoree at the 2014 Variety Power of Women luncheon, Davis further commented that "the thing that made me join...was the word 'eradicate', 'get rid of' – not by thirty-percent not by twenty-percent not by fifty-percent, but to do away [with it]. Because everyone should be a child, and should grow up and have a chance at the American dream". In September 2017, Davis started the $30K in 30 Days Project with Hunger Is, awarding a $1,000 grant to the Rhode Island Community food bank in her home state.

As part of her partnership with Vaseline to promote the Vaseline Healing Project, Davis attended the groundbreaking of a free community health center in Central Falls, Rhode Island in October 2016 that was sponsored by the project. The project provides dermatological care to help heal the skin of those affected by poverty around the world. She was also a speaker at the 2018 Women's March event in Los Angeles.

== Personal life ==
Davis married actor Julius Tennon in June 2003. In 2011, the couple welcomed a daughter, Genesis (b. 2010), via adoption. Davis is also a stepmother to Tennon's two children from previous relationships.

== Acting credits and accolades ==
Davis is widely regarded as one of the greatest actors of her generation. (Note: Attributed to multiple sources.) Chris Murphy of Vanity Fair said she achieved her reputation and accolades by consistently "delivering deeply felt performances, unmatched in their ability to access a seemingly endless well of emotion while remaining undeniably grounded". Steve McQueen, who directed Davis in Widows, called her "one of the greatest actors of her generation", believing she could act any role if allowed the opportunity.

For her stage work, Davis has won two Tony Awards, three Drama Desk Awards, an Obie Award, and a Theater World Award. She holds the distinction of becoming the first actress of color to win the Primetime Emmy Award for Outstanding Lead Actress in a Drama Series. Davis is the first African-American to win five Screen Actors Guild Awards. Davis is also tied for the most film wins for an actress at the Screen Actors Guild Awards; and with six overall wins, she is the most awarded African American. She has also received nominations for six Golden Globes Awards and three BAFTA Awards, winning one of each, in addition to winning the Academy Award for Best Supporting Actress for her performance in Fences (2016). This led to her becoming the first black performer to achieve the Triple Crown of Acting by winning a competitive Oscar, Emmy and Tony. She is also the first actress of colour to have received four Academy Award nominations.

Davis has been recognized by the Academy of Motion Picture Arts and Sciences (AMPAS) for the following films:

- 81st Academy Awards, Best Actress in a Supporting Role, nomination, for Doubt (2008)
- 84th Academy Awards, Best Actress in a Leading Role, nomination, for The Help (2011)
- 89th Academy Awards, Best Actress in a Supporting Role, win, for Fences (2016) (Note: Alongside Davis, Mahershala Ali won Best Supporting Actor for Moonlight, this marked the first time that both supporting role winners were people of color. Only once since have both supporting role winners been of another ethnicity other than white, this being in 2021 with Daniel Kaluuya and Youn Yuh-jung's respective wins for Best Supporting Actor and Best Supporting Actress.)
- 93rd Academy Awards, Best Actress in a Leading Role, nomination, for Ma Rainey's Black Bottom (2020) (Note: This, her fourth nomination, made Davis the first actress of color to be nominated four times and twice in both acting categories.)

Davis was awarded an honorary doctorate in Fine Arts from her undergraduate alma mater, Rhode Island College, in 2002. On January 20, 2020, Davis was awarded an honorary doctoral degree in fine arts from Indiana University. In February 2023, she was awarded the Grammy Award for Best Audio Book, Narration & Storytelling Recording for the narration to her 2022 autobiography Finding Me, making her the 18th person to achieve EGOT status. In 2024 it was announced she would receive the Golden Globe Cecil B. DeMille Award. In December of 2024, the Coalition for Faith and Media presented Davis and her husband Julius Tennon with an inaugural Faith and Spirituality in Entertainment Honor for the work of their production company JuVee Productions.

== Bibliography ==
- Davis, Viola (September 4, 2018). Corduroy Takes a Bow. New York: Viking Books for Young Readers. ISBN 9780425291474.
- Davis, Viola (April 22, 2022). Finding Me: A Memoir. New York: HarperOne. ISBN 9780063037328.
- Davis, Viola; Patterson, James (March 9, 2026). Judge Stone. Boston: Little, Brown and Company. ISBN 9780316579834.

== See also ==
- List of black Tony Award winners and nominees
- List of black Academy Award winners and nominees
- List of black Golden Globe Award winners and nominees
- List of EGOT winners
- List of Golden Globe winners
- List of Juilliard School people
- List of Primetime Emmy Award winners
- List of Rhode Island College people
