= NAACP Theatre Awards =

Awards to honor outstanding people of color in theatre

- Awarded for: Excellence in theatre by people of color
- Country: United States
- Presented by: NAACP
- First award: 1991
- Website: http://www.naacptheatreawards.com/

The NAACP Theatre Awards are a collection of NAACP member-voted awards started in 1991 and presented annually by the Beverly Hills-Hollywood branch of the NAACP to honor outstanding people of color in theater. The ceremony usually takes place in the Los Angeles area following the presentation ceremonies of the NAACP Image Awards. There are also honorary awards: the President's Award, Trailblazer Award, Spirit Award, Community Service Award, and Lifetime Achievement Award.

== Ceremonies ==
Year	Day	Host(s)	Location
2005	February 21	Jo Marie Payton/Glynn Turman	Vision Theatre
2006	February 20	Hill Harper/Valarie Pettiford	Directors Guild of America Theatre
2007	February 19	Chandra Wilson/Steve Harris	Directors Guild of America Theatre
2008	July 1	Anthony Anderson/Kimberly Elise	Kodak Theatre
2009	August 31	Loretta Devine/Terry Crews	Directors Guild of America Theatre
2010		Mekhi Phifer/LisaRaye	
2012	November 5		Directors Guild of America Theatre
2018	February 26	Wendy Raquel Robinson	Millennium Biltmore Hotel
2024	June 3		Tagylan Complex, Los Angeles

== Categories ==
=== Equity ===
- Best Choreography
- Best Costumes
- Best Director
- Best Director of a Musical
- Best Ensemble Cast
- Best Lead Female
- Best Lead Male
- Best Lighting
- Best Music Director
- Best Playwright
- Best Producer
- Best Set Design
- Best Sound
- Best Supporting Female
- Best Supporting Male

=== Local ===
- Best Choreography
- Best Costumes
- Best Director
- Best Director of a Musical
- Best Ensemble Cast
- Best Lead Female
- Best Lead Male
- Best Lighting
- Best Music Director
- Best Playwright
- Best Producer
- Best Set Design
- Best Sound
- Best Supporting Female
- Best Supporting Male

=== Special ===
- Community Service Award
- Lifetime Achievement Award
- President's Award
- Spirit Award
- Trailblazer Award
