= List of accolades received by The Dark Knight =

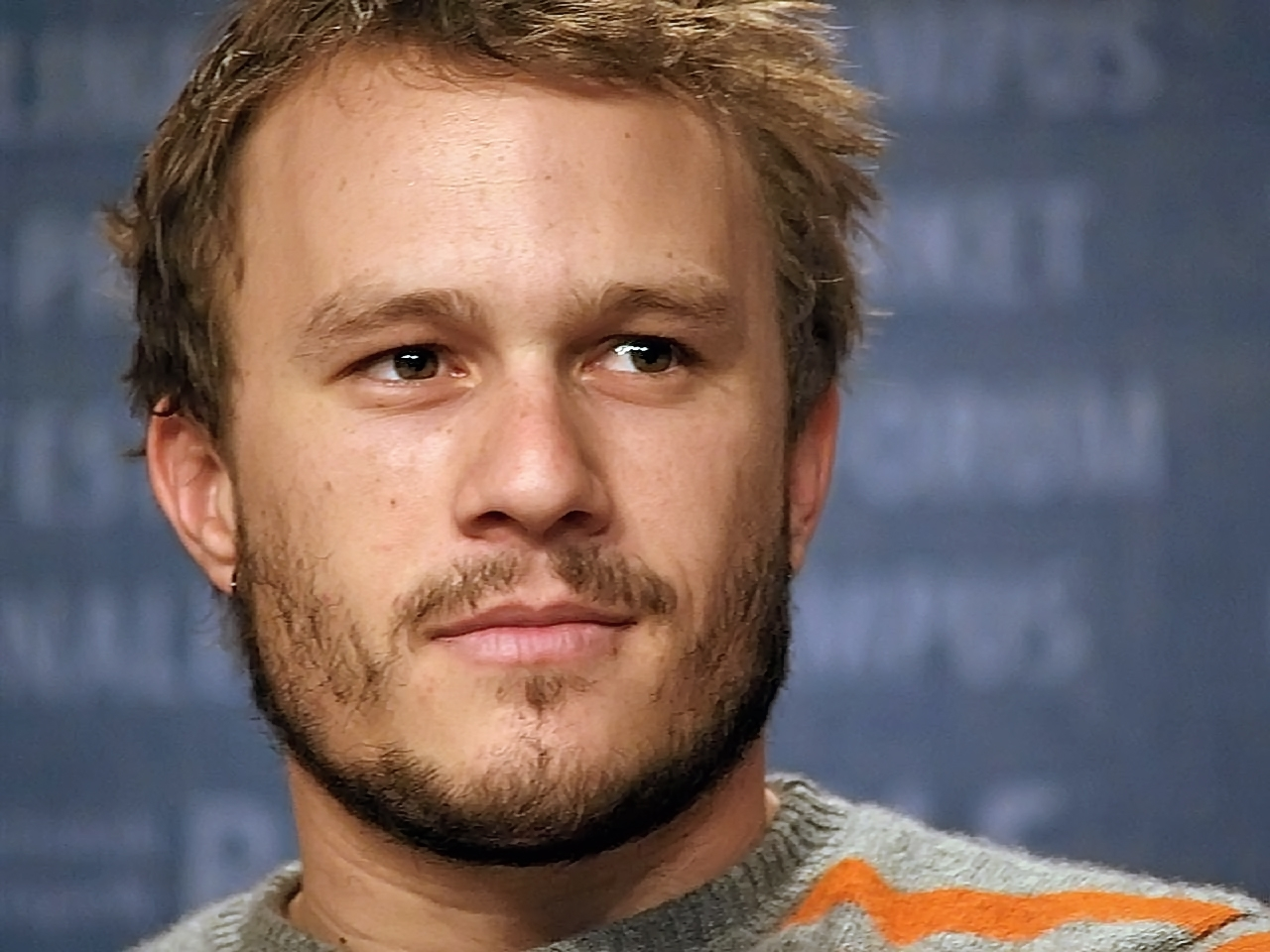
- Heath Ledger's performance of the Joker received widespread acclaim, earning him a posthumous Academy Award for Best Supporting Actor
Awards & nominations
Award	Won	Nominated
81st Academy Awards	2	8
American Film Institute	1	1
Australian Film Institute	1	1
British Academy of Film and Television Arts	1	9
Broadcast Film Critics Association	2	6
Empire Awards	3	4
Cannes Film Festival	1	1
Golden Trailer Awards	3	4
Grammy Awards	1	1
Kids' Choice Awards	0	1
MTV Movie Awards	1	4
National Board of Review	1	1
National Movie Awards	1	2
Project Fanboy Awards	2	2
People's Choice Awards	5	7
Satellite Awards	1	5
Saturn Awards	5	11
Scream Awards	12	20
Teen Choice Awards	2	5
Japanese Academy Awards	1	1
American Cinema Editors	0	1
American Society of Cinematographers	0	1
Art Directors Guild	0	1
Cinema Audio Society Awards	0	1
Costume Designers Guild	1	1
Directors Guild of America	0	1
Motion Picture Sound Editors	2	3
Producers Guild of America	0	1
Screen Actors Guild Awards	2	2
Visual Effects Society	3	3
World Stunt Awards	5	5
Writers Guild of America	0	1
African-American Film Critics Association	2	2
Australian Film Critics Association	1	1
Boston Society of Film Critics	1	1
Austin Film Critics Association	5	5
Central Ohio Film Critics Association	4	4
Chicago Film Critics Association	2	6
Dallas-Fort Worth Film Critics Association	3	4
Houston Film Critics Society	1	1
Florida Film Critics	2	2
International Film Music Critics Association	0	2
Iowa Film Critics	1	1
Kansas City Film Critics Circle	2	2
Las Vegas Film Critics Society	1	1
London Film Critics' Circle	0	2
Los Angeles Film Critics Association	1	4
National Society of Film Critics	0	1
New York Film Critics Online	1	1
Oklahoma Film Critics Circle	2	2
Online Film Critics Society	4	7
San Diego Film Critics Society	1	2
San Francisco Film Critics Circle	2	2
Southeastern Film Critics Association	2	2
St. Louis Gateway Film Critics Association	2	6
Toronto Film Critics	1	1
Utah Film Critics Association	2	3
Vancouver Film Critics	1	1
Washington D.C. Area Film Critics Association	1	1
World Soundtrack Academy	0	1
- Total number of wins and nominations
Totals	107	178
- References

The Dark Knight is a 2008 superhero film directed, produced, and co-written by Christopher Nolan. Based on the DC Comics character Batman, the film is the sequel to 2005's Batman Begins and the second installment in Nolan's The Dark Knight Trilogy. In the film, Bruce Wayne / Batman (Christian Bale) forms an alliance with Police Lieutenant James Gordon (Gary Oldman) and District Attorney Harvey Dent (Aaron Eckhart) to dismantle organized crime in Gotham City, but are thwarted by a criminal mastermind known as the Joker (Heath Ledger) who seeks to undermine Batman's influence and create chaos in Gotham. The film also stars Michael Caine as Bruce Wayne's butler (Alfred Pennyworth), Maggie Gyllenhaal as Rachel Dawes, and Morgan Freeman as Lucius Fox. It was released in Australia on July 16, 2008.

The Dark Knight grossed over a billion dollars worldwide, becoming the fourth film in history to gross more than $1 billion worldwide and the highest-grossing film of 2008. The Dark Knight also received wide critical acclaim, accumulating an approval rating of 94% on the review aggregator site Rotten Tomatoes.

The Dark Knight garnered numerous awards and nominations with particular praise for Heath Ledger's performance of the Joker. The film received eight Academy Award nominations at the 81st Academy Awards in 2009, winning two for Best Sound Editing and Best Supporting Actor (posthumously awarded to Ledger). Notably, the film's Best Sound Editing win prevented Best Picture winner Slumdog Millionaire from having a clean category-sweep.

At the People's Choice Awards—in which the winners are determined by the choices of the people (audience) in the Gallup polls—The Dark Knight won five awards, including: Favorite Movie, Favorite Action Movie, Favorite Superhero (Christian Bale as Bruce Wayne / Batman), Favorite On Screen Match-Up (Christian Bale and Heath Ledger), and Favourite Cast. The film was included in top-ten films of 2008 lists by multiple publications, including the American Film Institute and the National Board of Review.

In 2020, the film was selected for preservation in the United States National Film Registry by the Library of Congress for being "culturally, historically, or aesthetically significant".

== Accolades ==
Award	Date of ceremony	Category	Recipient(s) and nominee(s)	Result	Ref.
Academy Awards	February 22, 2009	Best Supporting Actor	Heath Ledger	Won	
Academy Awards	February 22, 2009	Best Art Direction	Art Direction: Nathan Crowley; Set Decoration: Peter Lando	Nominated	
Academy Awards	February 22, 2009	Best Cinematography	Wally Pfister	Nominated	
Academy Awards	February 22, 2009	Best Film Editing	Lee Smith	Nominated	
Academy Awards	February 22, 2009	Best Makeup	John Caglione Jr. and Conor O'Sullivan	Nominated	
Academy Awards	February 22, 2009	Best Sound Editing	Richard King	Won	
Academy Awards	February 22, 2009	Best Sound Mixing	Lora Hirschberg, Gary Rizzo and Ed Novick	Nominated	
Academy Awards	February 22, 2009	Best Visual Effects	Nick Davis, Chris Corbould, Tim Webber and Paul Franklin	Nominated	
African-American Film Critics Association Awards	December 19, 2008	Best Picture	The Dark Knight	Won	
African-American Film Critics Association Awards	December 19, 2008	Best Supporting Actor	Heath Ledger	Won	
Alliance of Women Film Journalists EDA Awards	–	Best Supporting Actor	Heath Ledger	Won	
Alliance of Women Film Journalists EDA Awards	–	Special Mention Award	The Dark Knight – Joker's first scene	Won	
American Cinema Editors Eddie Awards	February 15, 2009	Best Edited Feature Film – Dramatic	Lee Smith	Nominated	
American Film Institute Awards	N/A	Movies of the Year	The Dark Knight	Won	
American Society of Cinematographers Awards	February 15, 2009	Outstanding Achievement Award – Theatrical Release	Wally Pfister	Nominated	
Art Directors Guild Awards	February 14, 2009	Excellence in Production Design – Fantasy Films	Nathan Crowley	Won	
Austin Film Critics Association Awards	December 16, 2008	Best Supporting Actor	Heath Ledger	Won	
Austin Film Critics Association Awards	December 16, 2008	Best Picture	The Dark Knight	Won	
Austin Film Critics Association Awards	December 16, 2008	Best Director	Christopher Nolan	Won	
Austin Film Critics Association Awards	December 16, 2008	Best Adapted Screenplay	Christopher Nolan and Jonathan Nolan	Won	
Austin Film Critics Association Awards	December 16, 2008	Best Original Score	James Newton Howard and Hans Zimmer	Won	
Australian Film Critics Association	–	Commendation for Best Overseas Film	The Dark Knight	Won	
Australian Film Institute Awards	December 5–6, 2008	International Award for Best Actor	Heath Ledger	Won	
British Academy Film Awards	February 8, 2009	Best Actor in a Supporting Role	Heath Ledger	Won	
British Academy Film Awards	February 8, 2009	Best Cinematography	Wally Pfister	Nominated	
British Academy Film Awards	February 8, 2009	Best Costume Design	Lindy Hemming	Nominated	
British Academy Film Awards	February 8, 2009	Best Editing	Lee Smith	Nominated	
British Academy Film Awards	February 8, 2009	Best Film Music	Hans Zimmer and James Newton Howard	Nominated	
British Academy Film Awards	February 8, 2009	Best Makeup and Hair	Peter Robb-King	Nominated	
British Academy Film Awards	February 8, 2009	Best Production Design	Nathan Crowley and Peter Lando	Nominated	
British Academy Film Awards	February 8, 2009	Best Sound	Lora Hirschberg, Richard King, Ed Novick and Gary Rizzo	Nominated	
British Academy Film Awards	February 8, 2009	Best Special Visual Effects	Chris Corbould, Nick Davis, Paul Franklin and Tim Webber	Nominated	
Boston Society of Film Critics	December 14, 2008	Best Supporting Actor	Heath Ledger	Won	
Central Ohio Film Critics Association Awards	January 8, 2009	Top 10 Film of the Year (#4)	The Dark Knight	Won	
Central Ohio Film Critics Association Awards	January 8, 2009	Best Supporting Actor	Heath Ledger	Won	
Central Ohio Film Critics Association Awards	January 8, 2009	Best Acting Ensemble	Christian Bale, Heath Ledger, Aaron Eckhart, Gary Oldman, Michael Caine, Maggie Gyllenhaal, and Morgan Freeman	Won	
Central Ohio Film Critics Association Awards	January 8, 2009	Best Cinematography	Wally Pfister	Won	
Chicago Film Critics Association Awards	December 18, 2008	Best Picture	The Dark Knight	Nominated	
Chicago Film Critics Association Awards	December 18, 2008	Best Supporting Actor	Heath Ledger	Won	
Chicago Film Critics Association Awards	December 18, 2008	Best Director	Christopher Nolan	Nominated	
Chicago Film Critics Association Awards	December 18, 2008	Best Original Score	James Newton Howard and Hans Zimmer	Nominated	
Chicago Film Critics Association Awards	December 18, 2008	Best Cinematography	Wally Pfister	Won	
Chicago Film Critics Association Awards	December 18, 2008	Best Adapted Screenplay	Jonathan Nolan and Christopher Nolan	Nominated	
Cinema Audio Society Awards	February 14, 2009	Outstanding Achievement in Sound Mixing	Ed Novick, Lora Hirschberg, Gary A. Rizzo	Nominated	
Costume Designers Guild Awards	February 17, 2009	Excellence in Fantasy Film	Lindy Hemming	Won	
Critics' Choice Awards	January 8, 2009	Best Picture	The Dark Knight	Nominated	
Critics' Choice Awards	January 8, 2009	Best Director	Christopher Nolan	Nominated	
Critics' Choice Awards	January 8, 2009	Best Supporting Actor	Heath Ledger	Won	
Critics' Choice Awards	January 8, 2009	Best Acting Ensemble	The Dark Knight cast	Nominated	
Critics' Choice Awards	January 8, 2009	Best Action Movie	The Dark Knight	Won	
Critics' Choice Awards	January 8, 2009	Best Composer	Hans Zimmer and James Newton Howard	Nominated	
Dallas–Fort Worth Film Critics Association Awards	December 17, 2008	Top 10 Film of the Year (#3)	The Dark Knight	Won	
Dallas–Fort Worth Film Critics Association Awards	December 17, 2008	Best Supporting Actor	Heath Ledger	Won	
Dallas–Fort Worth Film Critics Association Awards	December 17, 2008	Best Cinematography	Wally Pfister	Won	
Dallas–Fort Worth Film Critics Association Awards	December 17, 2008	Best Director	Christopher Nolan	Runner-up	
Directors Guild of America Awards	January 31, 2009	Outstanding Directorial Achievement in Feature Film	Christopher Nolan	Nominated	
Empire Awards	March 29, 2009	Best Film	The Dark Knight	Won	
Empire Awards	March 29, 2009	Best Director	Christopher Nolan	Won	
Empire Awards	March 29, 2009	Best Actor	Christian Bale	Won	
Empire Awards	March 29, 2009	Best Sci-Fi/Superhero	The Dark Knight	Nominated	
Florida Film Critics Circle Awards	December 18, 2008	Best Supporting Actor	Heath Ledger	Won	
Florida Film Critics Circle Awards	December 18, 2008	Best Cinematography	Wally Pfister	Won	
Golden Globe Awards	January 11, 2009	Best Supporting Actor – Motion Picture	Heath Ledger	Won	
Golden Trailer Awards	–	Best in Show	The Dark Knight	Won	
Golden Trailer Awards	–	Best Action Trailer	The Dark Knight	Won	
Golden Trailer Awards	–	"Batman Teaser" Poster	The Dark Knight	Nominated	
Golden Trailer Awards	–	Best Summer 2008 Blockbuster Poster (teaser)	The Dark Knight	Won	
Golden Trailer Awards	–	Best Motion Title/Graphics	The Dark Knight	Nominated	
Grammy Awards	February 8, 2009	Best Score Soundtrack Album	James Newton Howard and Hans Zimmer	Won	
Houston Film Critics Society Awards	December 17, 2008	Best Supporting Actor	Heath Ledger	Won	
International Film Music Critics Association Awards	–	Film Score of the Year	James Newton Howard and Hans Zimmer	Nominated	
International Film Music Critics Association Awards	–	Best Original Score for an Action/Adventure Film	James Newton Howard and Hans Zimmer	Nominated	
Iowa Film Critics Awards	January 12, 2009	Best Supporting Actor	Heath Ledger	Won	
Japan Academy Prize	February 20, 2009	Outstanding Foreign Language Film	The Dark Knight	Won	
Kansas City Film Critics Circle Awards	–	Best Supporting Actor	Heath Ledger	Won	
Kansas City Film Critics Circle Awards	–	Best Fantasy or Horror Film	The Dark Knight	Won	
Las Vegas Film Critics Society Sierra Awards	December 18, 2008	Best Supporting Actor	Heath Ledger	Won	
London Film Critics' Circle Awards	February 4, 2009	Actor of the Year	Heath Ledger	Nominated	
London Film Critics' Circle Awards	February 4, 2009	British Director of the Year	Christopher Nolan	Nominated	
Los Angeles Film Critics Association Awards	December 9, 2008	Best Supporting Actor	Heath Ledger	Won	
Los Angeles Film Critics Association Awards	December 9, 2008	Best Film	The Dark Knight	Runner-up	
Los Angeles Film Critics Association Awards	December 9, 2008	Best Director	Christopher Nolan	Runner-up	
Los Angeles Film Critics Association Awards	December 9, 2008	Best Production Design	Nathan Crowley	Runner-up	
Motion Picture Sound Editors Golden Reel Awards	February 21, 2009	Best Sound Editing: Music in a Feature Film	Alex Gibson and Daniel Pinder	Won	
Motion Picture Sound Editors Golden Reel Awards	February 21, 2009	Best Sound Editing: Dialogue and ADR in a Feature Film	Richard King, Hugo Weng, Linda Folk, and Michael Magill	Nominated	
Motion Picture Sound Editors Golden Reel Awards	February 21, 2009	Best Sound Editing: Sound Effects and Foley in a Feature Film	Richard King, Christopher Flick, John Roesch, Alyson Dee Moore, Michael W. Mitchell, Hamilton Sterling and Michael Babcock	Won	
MTV Movie Awards	May 31, 2009	Best Movie	The Dark Knight	Nominated	
MTV Movie Awards	May 31, 2009	Best Male Performance	Christian Bale	Nominated	
MTV Movie Awards	May 31, 2009	Best Villain	Heath Ledger	Won	
MTV Movie Awards	May 31, 2009	Best Fight	Christian Bale vs. Heath Ledger	Nominated	
National Board of Review Awards	January 14, 2009	Top 10 Films of the Year	The Dark Knight	Won	
National Movie Awards	September 8, 2008	Best Superhero Film	The Dark Knight	Won	
National Movie Awards	September 8, 2008	Best Performance – Male	Christian Bale	Nominated	
National Society of Film Critics Awards	January 3, 2009	Best Supporting Actor	Heath Ledger	Runner-up	
New York Film Critics Online Awards	December 15, 2008	Best Supporting Actor	Heath Ledger	Won	
Nickelodeon Kids' Choice Awards	March 28, 2009	Favorite Movie	The Dark Knight	Nominated	
Oklahoma Film Critics Circle Awards	December 23, 2008	Best Supporting Actor	Heath Ledger	Won	
Oklahoma Film Critics Circle Awards	December 23, 2008	Top Ten Film of the Year	The Dark Knight	Won	
Online Film Critics Society Awards	January 19, 2009	Best Supporting Actor	Heath Ledger	Won	
Online Film Critics Society Awards	January 19, 2009	Best Director	Christopher Nolan	Won	
Online Film Critics Society Awards	January 19, 2009	Best Cinematography	Wally Pfister	Won	
Online Film Critics Society Awards	January 19, 2009	Best Picture	The Dark Knight	Nominated	
Online Film Critics Society Awards	January 19, 2009	Best Original Score	James Newton Howard and Hans Zimmer	Won	
Online Film Critics Society Awards	January 19, 2009	Best Adapted Screenplay	Jonathan Nolan and Christopher Nolan	Nominated	
Online Film Critics Society Awards	January 19, 2009	Best Editing	Lee Smith	Nominated	
People's Choice Awards	January 7, 2009	Favorite Movie	The Dark Knight	Won	
People's Choice Awards	January 7, 2009	Favorite Action Movie	The Dark Knight	Won	
People's Choice Awards	January 7, 2009	Favorite Cast	Christian Bale, Heath Ledger, Aaron Eckhart, Michael Caine, Gary Oldman, Maggie Gyllenhaal, and Morgan Freeman	Won	
People's Choice Awards	January 7, 2009	Favorite Male Action Star	Christian Bale	Nominated	
People's Choice Awards	January 7, 2009	Favorite Leading Man	Christian Bale	Nominated	
People's Choice Awards	January 7, 2009	Favorite On-Screen Match Up	Christian Bale and Heath Ledger	Won	
People's Choice Awards	January 7, 2009	Favorite Superhero	Christian Bale as Batman	Won	
Producers Guild of America Awards	January 24, 2009	Outstanding Producer of Theatrical Motion Pictures	Christopher Nolan, Charles Roven, Emma Thomas	Nominated	
Project Fanboy Awards	March 1, 2009	Best Comic Book to Movie Adaptation	Batman: The Dark Knight	Won	
Project Fanboy Awards	March 1, 2009	Best Comic Book to Movie Adaptation: Actor	Heath Ledger	Won	
San Diego Film Critics Society Awards	December 15, 2008	Best Supporting Actor	Heath Ledger	Won	
San Diego Film Critics Society Awards	December 15, 2008	Best Film	The Dark Knight	Runner-up	
San Francisco Film Critics Circle Awards	December 15, 2008	Best Supporting Actor	Heath Ledger	Won	
San Francisco Film Critics Circle Awards	December 15, 2008	Best Cinematography	Wally Pfister	Won	
Satellite Awards	December 14, 2008	Best Sound (Editing and Mixing)	Richard King, Lora Hirschberg, and Gary Rizzo	Won	
Satellite Awards	December 14, 2008	Best Director	Christopher Nolan	Nominated	
Satellite Awards	December 14, 2008	Best Supporting Actor	Heath Ledger	Nominated	
Satellite Awards	December 14, 2008	Best Visual Effects	Nick Davis, Chris Corbould, Tim Webber, Paul Franklin	Nominated	
Satellite Awards	December 14, 2008	Best Film Editing	Lee Smith	Nominated	
Saturn Awards	June 25, 2009	Best Action, Adventure, or Thriller Film	The Dark Knight	Won	
Saturn Awards	June 25, 2009	Best Director	Christopher Nolan	Nominated	
Saturn Awards	June 25, 2009	Best Writing	Jonathan Nolan and Christopher Nolan	Won	
Saturn Awards	June 25, 2009	Best Actor	Christian Bale	Nominated	
Saturn Awards	June 25, 2009	Best Actress	Maggie Gyllenhaal	Nominated	
Saturn Awards	June 25, 2009	Best Supporting Actor	Aaron Eckhart	Nominated	
Saturn Awards	June 25, 2009	Best Supporting Actor	Heath Ledger	Won	
Saturn Awards	June 25, 2009	Best Music	James Newton Howard and Hans Zimmer	Won	
Saturn Awards	June 25, 2009	Best Costume	Lindy Hemming	Nominated	
Saturn Awards	June 25, 2009	Best Make-Up	John Caglione, Jr. and Conor O’Sullian	Nominated	
Saturn Awards	June 25, 2009	Best Special Effects	Nick Davis, Chis Corbould, Tim Webber, Paul Franklin	Won	
Scream Awards	October 18, 2008	The Ultimate Scream	The Dark Knight	Won	
Scream Awards	October 18, 2008	Best Director	Christopher Nolan	Won	
Scream Awards	October 18, 2008	Best Screenplay	Christopher Nolan and Jonathan Nolan	Won	
Scream Awards	October 18, 2008	Best Sequel	The Dark Knight	Won	
Scream Awards	October 18, 2008	Best F/X	The Dark Knight	Won	
Scream Awards	October 18, 2008	Best Comic Book Movie	The Dark Knight	Won	
Scream Awards	October 18, 2008	Best Fantasy Actor	Heath Ledger	Won	
Scream Awards	October 18, 2008	Best Superhero	Christian Bale	Won	
Scream Awards	October 18, 2008	Best Villain	Heath Ledger	Won	
Scream Awards	October 18, 2008	Best Supporting Actor	Gary Oldman	Won	
Scream Awards	October 18, 2008	The Holy Sh!t Scene of the Year	Big Rig Flips over	Won	
Scream Awards	October 18, 2008	Best Line	Heath Ledger – "I believe that whatever doesn't kill you simply makes you... stranger!"	Won	
Scream Awards	October 18, 2008	Best Fantasy Movie	The Dark Knight	Nominated	
Scream Awards	October 18, 2008	Best Fantasy Actor	Christian Bale	Nominated	
Scream Awards	October 18, 2008	Best Fantasy Actress	Maggie Gyllenhaal	Nominated	
Scream Awards	October 18, 2008	Best Villain	Aaron Eckhart	Nominated	
Scream Awards	October 18, 2008	Best Supporting Actor	Michael Caine	Nominated	
Scream Awards	October 18, 2008	Best Line	Heath Ledger – "Why So Serious?"	Nominated	
Scream Awards	October 18, 2008	Best Line	Heath Ledger – "I'm gonna make this pencil disappear!"	Nominated	
Scream Awards	October 18, 2008	The Holy Sh!t Scene of the Year	The Batmobile/Batpod Chase	Nominated	
Screen Actors Guild Awards	January 25, 2009	Outstanding Supporting Actor	Heath Ledger	Won	
Screen Actors Guild Awards	January 25, 2009	Outstanding Stunt Ensemble	The Dark Knight	Won	
Southeastern Film Critics Association Awards	December 15, 2008	Best Supporting Actor	Heath Ledger	Won	
Southeastern Film Critics Association Awards	December 15, 2008	Top Ten Film of the Year (#4)	The Dark Knight	Won	
St. Louis Film Critics Association Awards	December 15, 2008	Best Supporting Actor	Heath Ledger	Won	
St. Louis Film Critics Association Awards	December 15, 2008	Best Special Effects	Nick Davis, Chris Corbould, Tim Webber, Paul Franklin	Won	
St. Louis Film Critics Association Awards	December 15, 2008	Best Music	James Newton Howard and Hans Zimmer	Nominated	
St. Louis Film Critics Association Awards	December 15, 2008	Best Director	Christopher Nolan	Nominated	
St. Louis Film Critics Association Awards	December 15, 2008	Best Picture	The Dark Knight	Nominated	
St. Louis Film Critics Association Awards	December 15, 2008	Best Cinematography	Wally Pfister	Nominated	
Taurus World Stunt Awards	May 12, 2009	Best Stunt Coordinator and/or 2nd Unit Director	Paul Jennings, Rick LeFevour, Tom Struthers	Won	
Taurus World Stunt Awards	May 12, 2009	Best Fight	Rob Cooper, Richard Hansen, Mark Mottram, Andy Pilgrim, Dominic Preece, Marvin Stewart-Campbell, Buster Reeves, Steen Young	Won	
Taurus World Stunt Awards	May 12, 2009	Best High Work	Mark Harper, Luke Kearney, Tom Lowell, Mark Mottram, Brian A. Peters	Won	
Taurus World Stunt Awards	May 12, 2009	Best Specialty Stunt	Jim Wilkey	Won	
Taurus World Stunt Awards	May 12, 2009	Best Work With a Vehicle	Rick Avery, Richard Burden, Gillie, McKenzie, George Cottle, Tobiasz Daszkiewicz, James Fierro, Terry Jackson, Tom Lowell, Rick Mille, Jean-Pierre Goy, Jim Wilkey	Won	
TEC Awards	October 10, 2009	Film Sound Production	The Dark Knight	Won	
Teen Choice Awards	August 4, 2008	Choice Movie: Summer – Action	The Dark Knight	Nominated	
Teen Choice Awards	August 4, 2008	Choice Movie: Rumble	Christian Bale vs. Heath Ledger	Won	
Teen Choice Awards	August 4, 2008	Choice Movie: Summer Actor	Heath Ledger	Won	
Teen Choice Awards	August 4, 2008	Choice Movie: Summer Actor	Christian Bale	Nominated	
Teen Choice Awards	August 4, 2008	Choice Movie: Summer Actress	Maggie Gyllenhaal	Nominated	
Toronto Film Critics Association Awards	December 17, 2008	Best Supporting Actor	Heath Ledger	Won	
Utah Film Critics Association Awards	–	Best Supporting Actor	Heath Ledger	Won	
Utah Film Critics Association Awards	–	Best Director	Christopher Nolan	Runner-up	
Utah Film Critics Association Awards	–	Best Picture	The Dark Knight	Won	
Vancouver Film Critics Circle Awards	January 13, 2009	Best Supporting Actor	Heath Ledger	Won	
Visual Effects Society Awards	February 10, 2009	Outstanding Models and Miniatures in a Feature Motion Picture (Garbage Truck Crash Models and Miniature)	Ian Hunter, Forest Fischer, Branden Seifert, Adam Gelbart	Won	
Visual Effects Society Awards	February 10, 2009	Outstanding Created Environment in a Feature Motion Picture (IMAX Gotham City Scapes)	Peter Bebb, David Vickery, Philippe Leprince, Andrew Lockley	Won	
Visual Effects Society Awards	February 10, 2009	Outstanding Special Effects in a Motion Picture	Chris Corbould, Peter Notley, Ian Lowe	Won	
Washington D.C. Area Film Critics Association Awards	December 8, 2008	Best Supporting Actor	Heath Ledger	Won	
World Soundtrack Academy Awards	October 17, 2009	Soundtrack Composer of the Year	Hans Zimmer (also for (Frost/Nixon and Angels & Demons))	Nominated	
Writers Guild of America Awards	February 7, 2009	Best Adapted Screenplay	Screenplay by Jonathan Nolan and Christopher Nolan; Story by Christopher Nolan and David S. Goyer	Nominated	

== See also ==
- 2008 in film
