= List of awards and nominations received by Marisa Tomei =

Marisa Tomei awards and nominations
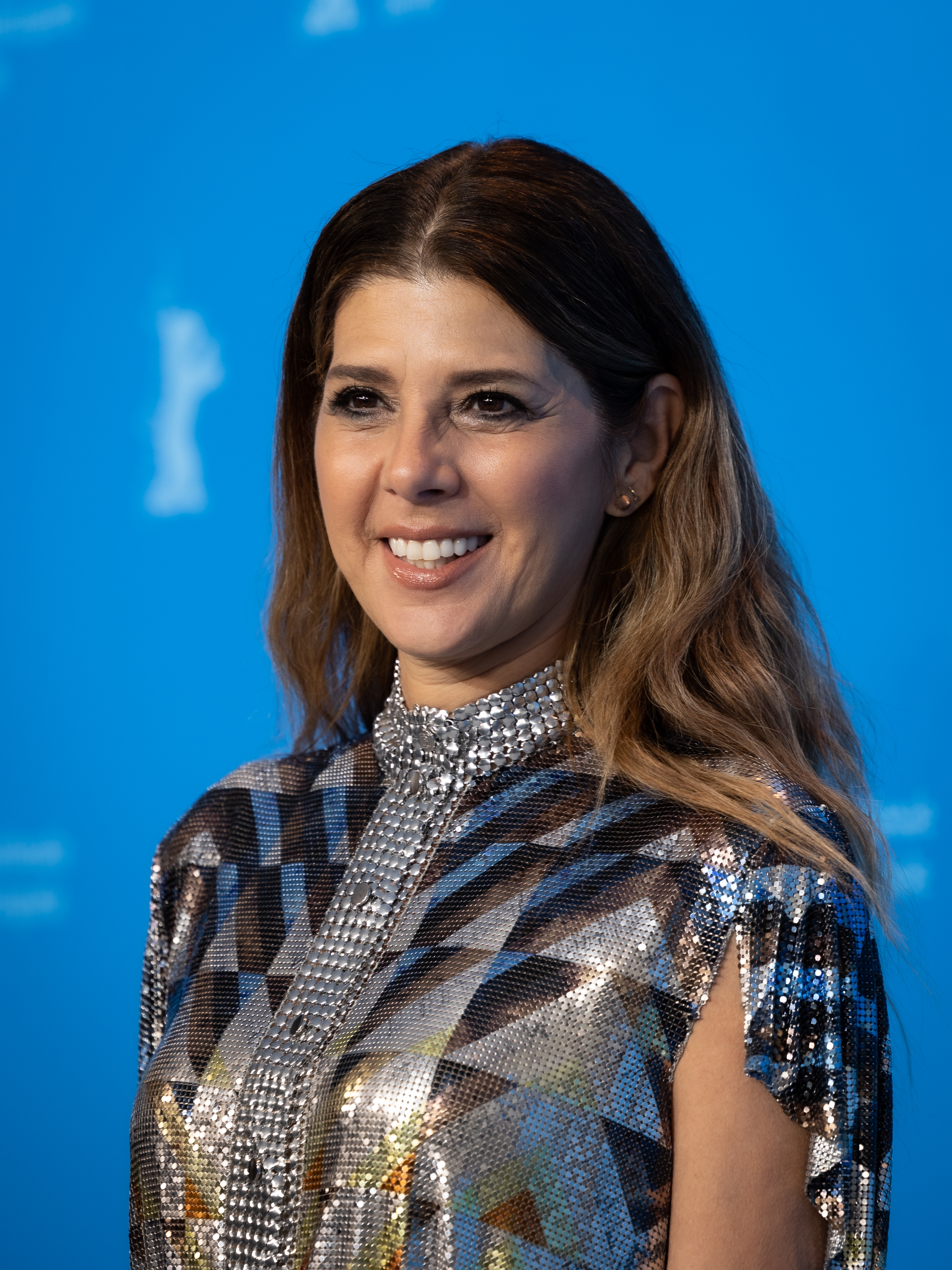
- Tomei at the 73rd Berlin International Film Festival in 2023
Awards and nominations
Award	Wins	Nominations
Academy Awards	1	3
SAG Awards	0	3
BAFTA Awards	0	1
Critics' Choice Awards	0	6
Emmy Awards	0	2
Golden Globes	0	2

Totals (Note: Certain award groups do not simply award one winner. They acknowledge several different recipients, have runners-up, and have third place. Since this is a specific recognition and is different from losing an award, runner-up mentions are considered wins in this award tally. For simplification and to avoid errors, each award in this list has been presumed to have had a prior nomination.)
- Wins: 22
- Nominations: 71

Marisa Tomei is an American actress known for her roles on stage and screen.

Tomei had her breakthrough role playing Mona Lisa Vito in the comedy film My Cousin Vinny (1992), for which she won the Academy Award for Best Supporting Actress. For the drama film Unhook the Stars (1996), she received her first Actor Award nomination for Outstanding Performance by a Female Actor in a Supporting Role. She continued playing supporting roles in comedies such has Slums of Beverly Hills (1998) and What Women Want (2000), receiving nominations at the Satellite Awards and the Teen Choice Awards among others.

Tomei played a single mother who gets involved in relationship with a younger man in Todd Field's drama In the Bedroom (2001), earning her second Academy Award nomination and nods for an Actor Award, a Critics' Choice Award and a Golden Globe Award. In 2008, she portrayed Cassidy/Pam, a struggling stripper, in the Darren Aronofsky-directed drama The Wrestler. Numerous critics heralded this performance as a standout in her career, and she was subsequently nominated for her third Academy Award for Best Supporting Actress, her first BAFTA Award for Best Actress in a Supporting Role and her second Golden Globe Award for Best Supporting Actress. From 2016 to 2021, Tomei portrayed Aunt May in the Marvel Cinematic Universe, receiving a nomination for the Saturn Award for Best Supporting Actress for Spider-Man: No Way Home (2021).

On television, Tomei took a guest role in the Fox drama series Empire (2015), for which she was nominated for a Critics' Choice Television Award for Best Guest Performer in a Drama Series. She has also been nominated for a Daytime Emmy Award in 1997 and a News & Documentary Emmy Award in 2024.

On stage, Tomei made her off-Broadway debut in 1986 as Cetta in the play Daughters at the Westside Theatre, winning a Theatre World Award. For her starring role in the Broadway play Top Girls (2008), she earned a Drama Desk Award for Outstanding Featured Actress in a Play nomination, while for the Will Eno's play The Realistic Joneses (2014), she won the Drama Desk Award for Outstanding Ensemble Performance. For the 2019 Broadway revival of The Rose Tattoo and the off-Broadway play Babe (2024), she received nominations for a Drama League Award and a Lucille Lortel Award, respectively.

== Major associations ==
=== Academy Awards ===
Year	Category	Nominated work	Result	Ref.
1993	Best Supporting Actress	My Cousin Vinny	Won	
2002	Best Supporting Actress	In the Bedroom	Nominated	
2009	Best Supporting Actress	The Wrestler	Nominated	

=== Actor Awards ===
Year	Category	Nominated work	Result	Ref.
1997	Outstanding Performance by a Female Actor in a Supporting Role	Unhook the Stars	Nominated	
2002	Outstanding Performance by a Cast in a Motion Picture	In the Bedroom	Nominated	
2016	Outstanding Performance by a Cast in a Motion Picture	The Big Short	Nominated	

=== BAFTA Awards ===
Year	Category	Nominated work	Result	Ref.
British Academy Film Awards
2009	Best Actress in a Supporting Role	The Wrestler	Nominated	

=== Critics' Choice Awards ===
Year	Category	Nominated work	Result	Ref.
Film
2002	Best Supporting Actress	In the Bedroom	Nominated	
2008	Best Acting Ensemble	Before the Devil Knows You're Dead	Nominated	
2009	Best Supporting Actress	The Wrestler	Nominated	
2011	Best Acting Ensemble	The Ides of March	Nominated	
2016	Best Acting Ensemble	The Big Short	Nominated	
Television
2016	Best Guest Performer in a Drama Series	Empire	Nominated	

=== Emmy Awards ===
Year	Category	Nominated work	Result	Ref.
Daytime Emmy Awards
1997	Outstanding Service Show Host	Marisa Tomei's Salute to Shirley Temple	Nominated	
News and Documentary Emmy Awards
2024	Best Documentary (Note: shared with the producers of the film)	Lakota Nation vs. United States	Nominated	

=== Golden Globes ===
Year	Category	Nominated work	Result	Ref.
2002	Best Supporting Actress – Motion Picture	In the Bedroom	Nominated	
2009	Best Supporting Actress – Motion Picture	The Wrestler	Nominated	

== Miscellaneous awards ==
Organizations	Year	Category	Work	Result	Ref.
American Comedy Awards	1993	Funniest Leading Actress in a Motion Picture	My Cousin Vinny	Nominated	
American Comedy Awards	1999	Funniest Supporting Actress in a Motion Picture	Slums of Beverly Hills	Nominated	
Blockbuster Entertainment Awards	2001	Favorite Supporting Actress – Comedy/Romance	What Women Want	Nominated	
Boston Society of Film Critics Awards	2015	Best Cast	The Big Short	Runner-up	
Chicago Film Critics Association Awards	1993	Most Promising Actress	Chaplin and My Cousin Vinny	Won	
Chicago Film Critics Association Awards	2002	Best Supporting Actress	In the Bedroom	Nominated	
Chlotrudis Awards	2002	Best Supporting Actress	In the Bedroom	Nominated	
Dallas–Fort Worth Film Critics Association Awards	2002	Best Supporting Actress	In the Bedroom	Won	
Dallas–Fort Worth Film Critics Association Awards	2008	Best Supporting Actress	The Wrestler	Nominated	
Detroit Film Critics Society Awards	2008	Best Supporting Actress	The Wrestler	Won	
Detroit Film Critics Society Awards	2015	Best Ensemble	The Big Short	Nominated	
Drama Desk Awards	2008	Outstanding Featured Actress in a Play	Top Girls	Nominated	
Drama Desk Awards	2014	Outstanding Ensemble Performance (Note: shared with Toni Collette, Michael C. Hall and Tracy Letts)	The Realistic Joneses	Won	
Drama League Awards	2020	Distinguished Performance	The Rose Tattoo	Nominated	
EDA Awards	2007	Best Depiction of Nudity or Sexuality (Note: shared with Philip Seymour Hoffman)	Before the Devil Knows You're Dead	Nominated	
EDA Awards	2008	Best Depiction of Nudity or Sexuality (Note: shared with Mickey Rourke)	The Wrestler	Nominated	
EDA Awards	2015	Best Ensemble Cast	The Big Short	Nominated	
Film Independent Spirit Awards	2008	Best Supporting Female	Before the Devil Knows You're Dead	Nominated	
Florida Film Critics Circle Awards	2008	Best Supporting Actress	The Wrestler	Won	
Florida Film Critics Circle Awards	2015	Best Cast	The Big Short	Nominated	
Georgia Film Critics Association Awards	2015	Best Ensemble	The Big Short	Nominated	
Golden Raspberry Awards	1992	Worst Supporting Actress	Oscar	Nominated	
Gotham Awards	2007	Best Ensemble Cast (Note: tied with the cast of Talk to Me)	Before the Devil Knows You're Dead	Won	
Gracie Awards	2007	Outstanding Supporting Actress in a Drama Series	Rescue Me	Won	
Hollywood Critics Association Midseason Awards	2020	Best Supporting Actress	The King of Staten Island	Nominated	
Hollywood Film Awards	2008	Supporting Actress of the Year	The Wrestler	Won	
Houston Film Critics Society Awards	2008	Best Supporting Actress	The Wrestler	Nominated	
International Cinephile Society Awards	2009	Best Supporting Actress	The Wrestler	Nominated	
Las Vegas Film Critics Society Awards	2002	Best Supporting Actress	In the Bedroom	Nominated	
Las Vegas Film Critics Society Awards	2008	Best Supporting Actress	The Wrestler	Won	
Lucille Lortel Awards	2025	Outstanding Lead Performer in a Play	Babe	Nominated	
MTV Movie & TV Awards	1993	Best Breakthrough Performance	My Cousin Vinny	Won	
MTV Movie & TV Awards	1993	Best Kiss (Note: shared with Christian Slater)	Untamed Heart	Won	
National Board of Review Awards	2015	Best Cast	The Big Short	Won	
National Society of Film Critics Awards	2002	Best Supporting Actress	In the Bedroom	Nominated	
Online Film Critics Society Awards	2002	Best Supporting Actress	In the Bedroom	Nominated	
Online Film Critics Society Awards	2009	Best Supporting Actress	The Wrestler	Won	
Palm Springs International Film Festival Awards	2016	Ensemble Cast Award	The Big Short	Won	
Phoenix Film Critics Society Awards	2002	Best Supporting Actress	In the Bedroom	Nominated	
Phoenix Film Critics Society Awards	2008	Best Supporting Actress	The Wrestler	Won	
St. Louis Film Critics Association Awards	2008	Best Supporting Actress	The Wrestler	Nominated	
San Diego Film Critics Society Awards	2008	Best Supporting Actress	The Wrestler	Won	
San Diego Film Critics Society Awards	2015	Best Performance by an Ensemble	The Big Short	Nominated	
San Francisco Bay Area Film Critics Circle Awards	2008	Best Supporting Actress	The Wrestler	Won	
Satellite Awards	2001	Best Supporting Actress in a Motion Picture – Comedy or Musical	What Women Want	Nominated	
Satellite Awards	2002	Best Supporting Actress in a Motion Picture – Drama	In the Bedroom	Nominated	
Satellite Awards	2007	Best Cast – Motion Picture	Before the Devil Knows You're Dead	Won	
Satellite Awards	2010	Best Actress in a Motion Picture – Comedy or Musical	Cyrus	Nominated	
Saturn Awards	2022	Best Supporting Actress	Spider-Man: No Way Home	Nominated	
Southeastern Film Critics Association Awards	2001	Best Supporting Actress	In the Bedroom	Won (Note: tied with Jennifer Connelly for A Beautiful Mind and Maggie Smith for Gosford Park)	
Teen Choice Awards	1999	Funniest Scene (Note: shared with Natasha Lyonne)	Slums of Beverly Hills	Nominated	
Theatre World Awards	1986	Outstanding Broadway or Off-Broadway Debut	Daughters	Won	
Vancouver Film Critics Circle Awards	2009	Best Supporting Actress	The Wrestler	Nominated	
Washington D.C. Area Film Critics Association Awards	2015	Best Ensemble	The Big Short	Nominated	
