= List of accolades received by WALL-E =

WALL-E awards and nominations
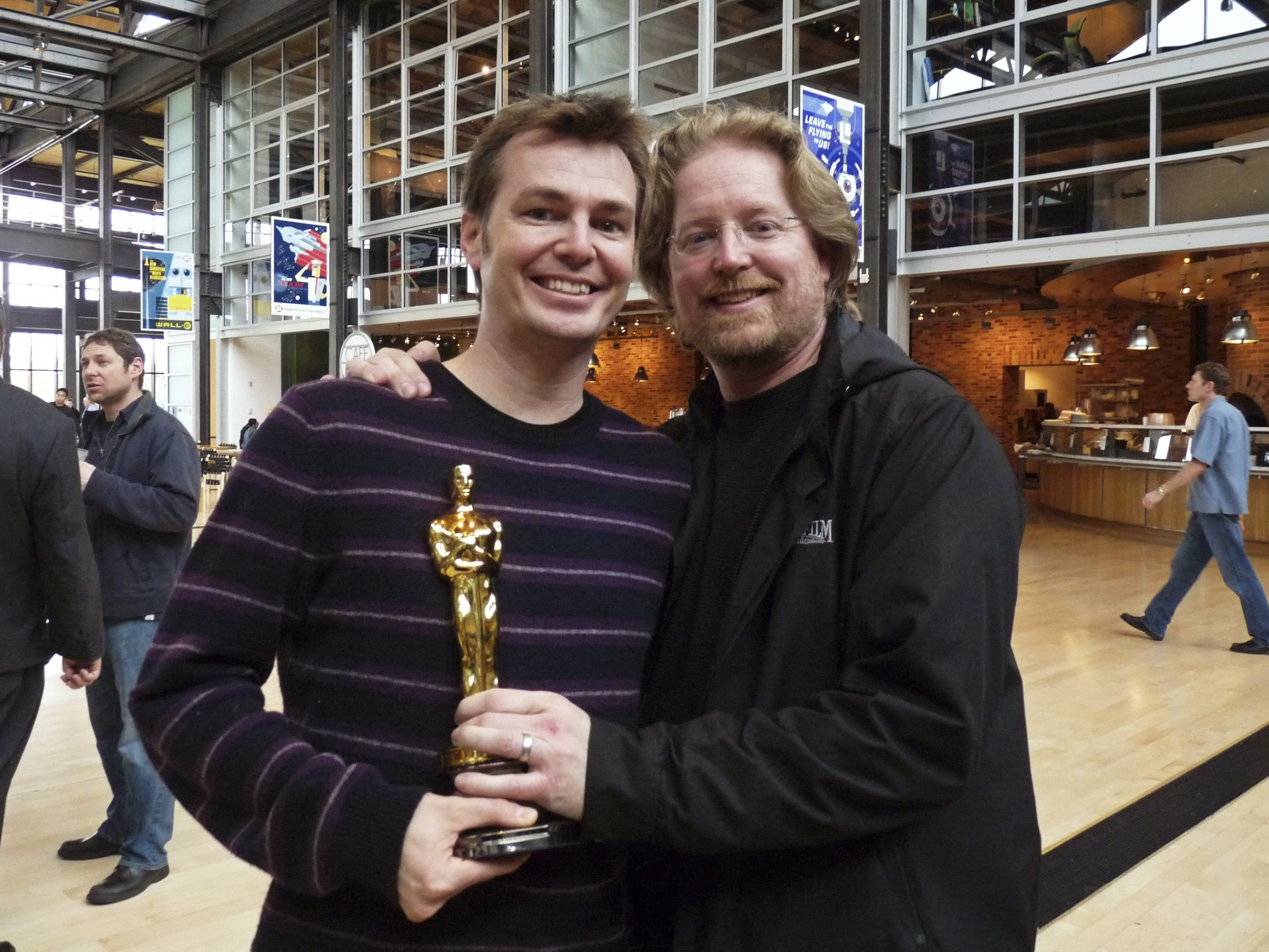
- Andrew Stanton and Victor Navone holding the Academy Award for Best Animated Feature
Awards and nominations
Award	Wins	Nominations
Academy Awards	1	6
American Cinema Editors	1	1
Animation Kobe	1	1
Annie Awards	0	7
Art Directors Guild Awards	0	1
Boston Society of Film Critics	2	2
British Academy of Film and Television Arts	2	4
Broadcast Film Critics	1	3
Cinema Audio Society Awards	0	1
Chicago Film Critics Association	4	5
Dallas-Fort Worth Film Critics Association Award	1	1
Florida Film Critics Circle Award	1	1
Golden Globe Awards	1	2
Grammy Awards	2	3
Hollywood Film Festival	1	1
Hugo Award	1	1
Kids' Choice Awards	0	1
Los Angeles Film Critics	1	1
Motion Picture Sound Editors	1	1
National Board of Review	1	1
National Movie Awards	2	2
Nebula Award	1	1
New York Film Critics	1	1
Online Film Critics Society	3	6
People's Choice Awards	1	1
Producers Guild of America	1	1
San Diego Film Critics Society	1	1
Satellite Awards	1	4
Saturn Award	1	2
Scream Awards	1	3
Teen Choice Awards	0	1
Toronto Film Critics Association	1	3
Visual Effects Society	3	3
World Soundtrack Awards	1	2

Totals (Note: Certain award groups do not simply award one winner. They acknowledge several different recipients, have runners-up, and have third place. Since this is a specific recognition and is different from losing an award, runner-up mentions are considered wins in this award tally. For simplification and to avoid errors, each award in this list has been presumed to have had a prior nomination.)
- Wins: 43
- Nominations: 78

WALL-E (promoted with an interpunct as WALL•E) is an American animation film released in 2008 and directed by Andrew Stanton and produced by Pixar Animation Studios. Walt Disney Pictures released it in the United States and Canada on June 27, 2008, grossing $23.1 million on its opening day, and $63 million during its opening weekend in 3,992 theaters, ranking number 1 at the box office. It eventually grossed $223 million domestically and $533 million worldwide. WALL-E received critical acclaim, with an approval rating of 95% on the review aggregator Rotten Tomatoes.

The film was nominated for several awards, including seven Annie Awards, six Academy Awards, and two Golden Globe Awards. WALL-E did not win any of the Annie Awards, all of them awarded to categories competitor Kung Fu Panda. It won the Academy Award for Best Animated Feature and was nominated for Best Original Song, Best Original Score, Sound Mixing, Sound Editing and Best Original Screenplay at the 81st Academy Awards. Disney pushed for an Academy Award for Best Picture nomination, but it was not nominated, sparking controversy over whether the Academy of Motion Pictures Arts and Sciences deliberately restricted WALL-E to the Best Animated Feature category. Film critic Peter Travers remarked, "If there was ever a time where an animated feature deserved to be nominated for best picture it's Wall-E."

The feature has won Best Picture from the Boston Society of Film Critics, the Chicago Film Critics Association, the Online Film Critics Society, and the Los Angeles Film Critics Association, where it became the first animated feature to win that award. It also became the first animated film to win Best Editing for a Comedy or Musical from the American Cinema Editors. The character WALL-E was listed at #63 on Empire's 2008 online poll of the 100 greatest movie characters. Time listed WALL-E number 1 in its top 10 movies of 2008, praising the directors' achievement in connecting with a large audience even though the characters have nearly no dialogue. In early 2010, Time ranked WALL-E number 1 in "Best Movies of the Decade." In 2016, the film was voted 29th out of 100 films regarded as the best of the 21st century by 117 film critics from around the world.

== Accolades ==
Accolades received by WALL-E
Award	Date of ceremony	Category	Recipients	Result
Academy Awards	February 22, 2009	Best Original Screenplay	Andrew Stanton (screenplay/story), Jim Reardon (screenplay), Pete Docter (story)	Nominated
Academy Awards	February 22, 2009	Best Animated Feature	Andrew Stanton	Won
Academy Awards	February 22, 2009	Best Original Score	Thomas Newman	Nominated
Academy Awards	February 22, 2009	Best Original Song	Peter Gabriel (music and lyrics), Thomas Newman (music) ("Down to Earth")	Nominated
Academy Awards	February 22, 2009	Best Sound Editing	Ben Burtt, Matthew Wood	Nominated
Academy Awards	February 22, 2009	Best Sound Mixing	Tom Myers, Michael Semanick, Ben Burtt	Nominated
American Cinema Editors	February 15, 2009	Best Edited Feature Film – Comedy or Musical	Stephen Schaffer	Won
Alliance of Women Film Journalists Awards	December 15, 2008	Best Original Screenplay	Andrew Stanton (story/screenplay), Jim Reardon (screenplay), Pete Docter (story)	Won
The 14th Animation Kobe	October 18, 2009	Theatrical Film Award	Andrew Stanton	Won
Annie Awards	January 30, 2009	Animated Effects	Enrique Vila	Nominated
Annie Awards	January 30, 2009	Best Animated Feature	Jim Morris	Nominated
Annie Awards	January 30, 2009	Character Animation in a Feature Production	Victor Navone	Nominated
Annie Awards	January 30, 2009	Directing in an Animated Feature Production	Andrew Stanton	Nominated
Annie Awards	January 30, 2009	Production Design in an Animated Feature Production	Ralph Eggleston	Nominated
Annie Awards	January 30, 2009	Storyboarding in an Animated Feature Production	Ronnie del Carmen	Nominated
Annie Awards	January 30, 2009	Voice Acting in an Animated Feature Production	Ben Burtt (as WALL-E)	Nominated
Art Directors Guild Awards	February 14, 2009	Excellence in Production Design for a Fantasy Film	Ralph Eggleston	Nominated
Boston Society of Film Critics	February 8, 2009	Best Film		Won (Note: Tied with Slumdog Millionaire)
Boston Society of Film Critics	February 8, 2009	Best Animated Film		Won
British Academy of Film and Television Arts	February 8, 2009	Best Animated Film	Andrew Stanton	Won
British Academy of Film and Television Arts	February 8, 2009	Best Film Music	Thomas Newman	Nominated
British Academy of Film and Television Arts	February 8, 2009	Best Sound	Ben Burtt, Tom Myers, Michael Semanick, Matthew Wood	Nominated
British Academy Children's Awards	2008	Best Feature Film	Jim Morris, Andrew Stanton	Won
Broadcast Film Critics Association	January 8, 2009	Best Animated Feature	Andrew Stanton	Won
Broadcast Film Critics Association	January 8, 2009	Best Picture	Jim Morris	Nominated
Broadcast Film Critics Association	January 8, 2009	Best Song	Thomas Newman, Peter Gabriel (for "Down to Earth")	Nominated
Chicago Film Critics Association	December 18, 2008	Best Picture		Won
Chicago Film Critics Association	December 18, 2008	Best Animated Feature		Won
Chicago Film Critics Association	December 18, 2008	Best Director	Andrew Stanton	Nominated
Chicago Film Critics Association	December 18, 2008	Best Original Screenplay	Andrew Stanton, Jim Reardon	Won
Chicago Film Critics Association	December 18, 2008	Best Original Score	Thomas Newman	Won
Cinema Audio Society Awards	February 14, 2009	Outstanding Achievement in Sound Mixing for Motion Pictures	Ben Burtt, Tom Myers, Michael Semanick	Nominated
Dallas-Fort Worth Film Critics Association Award	December 17, 2008	Best Animated Film		Won
Florida Film Critics Circle Award	December 18, 2008	Best Animated Feature		Won
Golden Globe Awards	January 11, 2009	Best Original Song	Peter Gabriel, Thomas Newman (for "Down to Earth")	Nominated
Golden Globe Awards	January 11, 2009	Best Animated Film	Andrew Stanton	Won
Grammy Awards	February 8, 2009	Best Score Soundtrack Album for Motion Picture, Television or Other Visual Media	Thomas Newman	Nominated
Grammy Awards	February 8, 2009	Best Song Written for Motion Picture, Television or Other Visual Media	Thomas Newman, Peter Gabriel (for "Down to Earth")	Won
Grammy Awards	February 8, 2009	Best Instrumental Arrangement	Thomas Newman, Peter Gabriel (for "Define Dancing")	Won
Hollywood Film Festival	October 27, 2008	Animation of the Year	Andrew Stanton	Won
Hugo Awards	August 8, 2009	Best Dramatic Presentation, Long Form	Andrew Stanton & Pete Docter (story), Andrew Stanton & Jim Reardon (screenplay), Andrew Stanton (director)	Won
International Film Music Critics Association	February 20, 2009	Film Score of the Year	Thomas Newman	Nominated
International Film Music Critics Association	February 20, 2009	Film Composer of the Year	Thomas Newman	Nominated
International Film Music Critics Association	February 20, 2009	Best Original Score for an Animated Feature	Thomas Newman	Won
International Film Music Critics Association	February 20, 2009	Film Composition of the Year	Thomas Newman and Peter Gabriel (for Define Dancing)	Nominated
Kids' Choice Awards	March 28, 2009	Favorite Animated Movie	Andrew Stanton	Nominated
Los Angeles Film Critics	December 9, 2008	Best Film		Won
Motion Picture Sound Editors	February 21, 2009	Best Sound Editing: Sound Effects, Foley, Music, Dialogue and ADR Animation in a Feature Film		Won
National Board of Review	December 4, 2008	Top Ten Films		Won
National Board of Review	December 4, 2008	Best Animated Feature		Won
National Movie Awards	2008	Best Family Film		Won
National Movie Awards	2008	Special Honorary Award	Pixar	Won
Nebula Awards	April 25, 2009	Best Script	Andrew Stanton, Jim Reardon	Won
New York Film Critics	December 10, 2008	Best Animated Film		Won
Online Film Critics Society	January 19, 2009	Best Picture		Won
Online Film Critics Society	January 19, 2009	Best Animated Feature		Won
Online Film Critics Society	January 19, 2009	Best Director	Andrew Stanton	Nominated
Online Film Critics Society	January 19, 2009	Best Original Screenplay	Andrew Stanton & Jim Reardon	Won
Online Film Critics Society	January 19, 2009	Best Original Score	Thomas Newman	Nominated
Online Film Critics Society	January 19, 2009	Best Editing	Stephen Schaffer	Nominated
People's Choice Awards	January 7, 2009	Favorite Family Movie		Won
Producers Guild of America	January 24, 2009	Animated Theatrical Motion Pictures	Jim Morris	Won
San Diego Film Critics Society	December 15, 2008	Best Animated Feature		Won
Satellite Awards	December 14, 2008	Best Animated or Mixed Media Feature		Won
Satellite Awards	December 14, 2008	Best Original Score	Thomas Newman	Nominated
Satellite Awards	December 14, 2008	Best Original Song	Peter Gabriel, Thomas Newman (for "Down to Earth")	Nominated
Satellite Awards	December 14, 2008	Best Sound	Ben Burtt, Matthew Wood	Nominated
Saturn Awards	June 25, 2009	Best Animated Film		Won
Saturn Awards	June 25, 2009	Best Director	Andrew Stanton	Nominated
Scream Awards	October 21, 2008	Best Science Fiction Movie		Nominated
Scream Awards	October 21, 2008	Breakout Performance	WALL-E	Won
Scream Awards	October 21, 2008	Best Scream-Play	Andrew Stanton (story/screenplay), Jim Reardon (screenplay), and Pete Docter (story)	Nominated
Teen Choice Awards	August 3, 2008	Best Summer Comedy Movie		Nominated
Toronto Film Critics Association	December 17, 2008	Best Picture		Nominated
Toronto Film Critics Association	December 17, 2008	Best Animated Film		Won
Toronto Film Critics Association	December 17, 2008	Best Director	Andrew Stanton	Nominated
Visual Effects Society	February 21, 2009	Outstanding Animated Character in an Animated Motion Picture	Ben Burtt, Victor Navone, William Austin Lee, Jay Shuster (WALL-E)	Won
Visual Effects Society	February 21, 2009	Outstanding Animation in an Animated Motion Picture	Andrew Stanton, Jim Morris, Lindsey Collins, Nigel Hardwidge	Won
Visual Effects Society	February 21, 2009	Outstanding Effects Animation in an Animated Feature Motion Picture	Jason Johnston, Keith Daniel Klohn, Enrique Vila, Bill Watral	Won
Women Film Critics Circle	January 8, 2009	Best Family Film		Won
Women Film Critics Circle	January 8, 2009	Best Animated Female	Elissa Knight (EVE)	Won
World Soundtrack Awards	2008	Best Original Score of the Year	Thomas Newman	Nominated
World Soundtrack Awards	2008	Best Original Song Written Directly for Film	Thomas Newman, Peter Gabriel (for "Down to Earth")	Won
