= San Francisco Bay Area Film Critics Circle Award for Best Cinematography =

Annual US film award

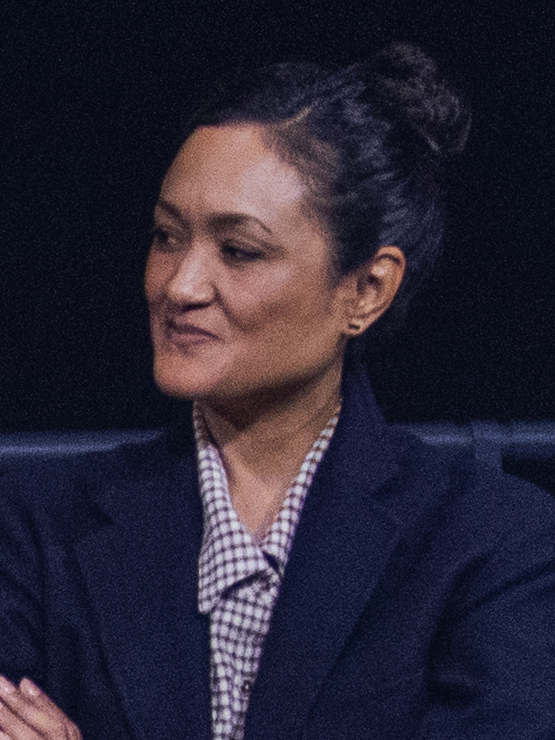
- The 2025 recipient: Autumn Durald Arkapaw
- Awarded for: Best Achievement in Cinematography
- Country: United States
- Presented by: San Francisco Bay Area Film Critics Circle
- First award: Wally Pfister; The Dark Knight (2008)
- Currently held by: Autumn Durald Arkapaw; Sinners (2025)
- Website: sfbafcc.com

The San Francisco Bay Area Film Critics Circle Award for Best Cinematography is an award given by the San Francisco Bay Area Film Critics Circle to honor a cinematographer who has delivered an outstanding achievement while working in the film industry.

== Winners ==
=== 2000s ===
Year	Winner	Film
2008	Wally Pfister	The Dark Knight
2009	Roger Deakins	A Serious Man

=== 2010s ===
Year	Winner	Film
2010	Matthew Libatique	Black Swan
2011	Emmanuel Lubezki	The Tree of Life
2012	Claudio Miranda	Life of Pi
2013	Emmanuel Lubezki	Gravity
2014	Łukasz Żal and Ryszard Lenczewski	Ida
2015	John Seale	Mad Max: Fury Road
2016	James Laxton	Moonlight
2017	Roger Deakins	Blade Runner 2049
2018	Alfonso Cuarón	Roma
2019	Roger Deakins	1917

=== 2020s ===
Year	Winner	Film
2020	Christopher Blauvelt	First Cow
2021	Bruno Delbonnel	The Tragedy of Macbeth
2022	Florian Hoffmeister	Tár
2023	Hoyte van Hoytema	Oppenheimer
2024	Lol Crawley	The Brutalist
2025	Autumn Durald Arkapaw	Sinners
