= Hollywood Supporting Actress Award =

Former annual US film award

The Hollywood Supporting Actress Award is a category of the Hollywood Film Festival held annually, with the exception of 2004, since 2003.

== Winners ==
Year	Winner	Film(s)	Role
2003	Alison Lohman	Big Fish / Matchstick Men	Sandra Templeton / Angela
2005	Susan Sarandon	Elizabethtown	Hollie Baylor
2006	Sandra Bullock	Infamous / The Lake House	Harper Lee / Kate Forster
2007	Jennifer Connelly	Reservation Road	Grace Learner
2008	Marisa Tomei	The Wrestler	Pam / Cassidy
2009	Julianne Moore	A Single Man	Charlotte (Charley)
2010	Helena Bonham Carter	Alice in Wonderland / The King's Speech	Red Queen / Queen Elizabeth
2011	Carey Mulligan	Drive / Shame	Irene / Sissy Sullivan
2012	Amy Adams	The Master / On the Road / Trouble with the Curve	Peggy Dodd / Jane / Mickey Lobel
2013	Julia Roberts	August: Osage County	Barbara Weston-Fordham
2014	Keira Knightley	The Imitation Game	Joan Clarke
2015	Jane Fonda	Youth	Brenda Morel
2016	Nicole Kidman	Lion	Sue Brierley
2017	Allison Janney	I, Tonya	LaVona Golden
2018	Rachel Weisz	The Favourite	Sarah Churchill
2019	Laura Dern	Marriage Story	Nora Fanshaw
