= Paul E. Normous =

American professional wrestler (1975 – 2009)

Personal information
- Born: Paul Fuchs; April 15, 1975 Queens, New York City, New York, United States
- Died: January 16, 2009 (aged 33) Sloatsburg, New York, United States
- Cause of death: Drug overdose

Professional wrestling career
- Ring name(s): Paul E. Normous; Secret Weapon
- Billed height: 6 ft 5 in (196 cm)
- Billed weight: 271 lb (123 kg)
- Trained by: Little Guido
- Debut: February 15, 2002

Paul Fuchs (April 15, 1975 – January 16, 2009) was an American professional wrestler, better known by his ring name, Paul E. Normous. He wrestled primarily in the eastern United States for independent promotions such as the East Coast Wrestling Association.

== Professional wrestling career ==
Fuchs had a career in football at first. He was trained by Little Guido and made his debut on February 15, 2002 for Pro-Pain Pro Wrestling at its inaugural show in Philadelphia teaming with CM Punk and Colt Cabana losing to Christian York, Joey Matthews, and Ric Blade. He made a few appearances during the early days of Ring of Honor.

In 2003 he wrestled for Ohio Valley Wrestling under the property of World Wrestling Entertainment feuding with Matt Cappotelli. He defeated Cappotelli at OVW Six Flags Summer Sizzler Series event on June 27 under the guidance of manager Morris (Mo Green). On July 25, he would team up with Jerome Crony losing to Cappotelli and John Hennigan. He left OVW in 2004 and continued wrestling in the independents. On May 5, 2004 he made an appearance for Total Nonstop Action Wrestling teaming with Johnny Parks losing to Dallas and Kid Kash on TNA Xplosion.

In 2006 he went to East Coast Wrestling Association and feuded with Glen Osborne. He left the company in 2007.

He wrestled his last match on December 6, 2008, for PWS Firestorm II in Yonkers, New York.

== Other ventures ==
Normous appeared in Mickey Rourke's The Wrestler.

== Death ==
On January 16, 2009 Fuchs died of a substance overdose in his parents' home in Sloatsburg, New York.
