= Houston Film Critics Society Awards 2008 =

Annual US film awards ceremony

2nd Houston Film Critics Society Awards
- Date: December 17, 2008
- Location: Museum of Fine Arts; Houston, Texas
- Country: United States
- Presented by: Houston Film Critics Society
- Website: houstonfilmcritics.com/awards

The 2nd Houston Film Critics Society Awards were given out at a ceremony held at the Museum of Fine Arts, Houston on December 17, 2008. The awards are presented annually by the Houston Film Critics Society based in Houston, Texas.

== Winners and nominees ==
Winners are listed first and highlighted with boldface

Best Picture	Best Foreign Language Film
**The Curious Case of Benjamin Button**; The Dark Knight; Milk; Slumdog Millionaire; WALL-E	**Mongol** • Kazakhstan; Che • Spain; Gomorra • Italy; I've Loved You So Long • France; Let the Right One In • Sweden
Best Performance by an Actor in a Leading Role	Best Performance by an Actress in a Leading Role
**Sean Penn** - **Milk** as **Harvey Milk**; Leonardo DiCaprio - Revolutionary Road as Frank Wheeler; Richard Jenkins - The Visitor as Walter Vale; Frank Langella - Frost/Nixon as Richard Nixon; Brad Pitt - The Curious Case of Benjamin Button as Benjamin Button; Mickey Rourke - The Wrestler as Randy "The Ram" Robinson	**Anne Hathaway** - **Rachel Getting Married** as **Kym**; Cate Blanchett - The Curious Case of Benjamin Button as Daisy Fuller; Angelina Jolie - Changeling as Christine Collins; Melissa Leo - Frozen River as Ray Eddy; Meryl Streep - Doubt as Sister Aloysius Beauvier; Kate Winslet - Revolutionary Road as April Wheeler
Best Performance by an Actor in a Supporting Role	Best Performance by an Actress in a Supporting Role
**Heath Ledger** - **The Dark Knight** as **The Joker**; Josh Brolin - Milk as Dan White; Tom Cruise - Tropic Thunder as Les Grossman; Robert Downey Jr. - Tropic Thunder as Kirk Lazarus; Brad Pitt - Burn After Reading as Chad Feldheimer	**Viola Davis** - **Doubt** as **Mrs. Miller**; Amy Adams - Doubt as Sister James; Penélope Cruz - Vicky Cristina Barcelona as María Elena; Taraji P. Henson - The Curious Case of Benjamin Button as Queenie; Marisa Tomei - The Wrestler as Pam / Cassidy
Best Director	Best Cinematography
**Danny Boyle** - **Slumdog Millionaire**; David Fincher - The Curious Case of Benjamin Button; Christopher Nolan - The Dark Knight; Ron Howard - Frost/Nixon; Gus Van Sant - Milk	**The Curious Case of Benjamin Button** - **Claudio Miranda**; The Dark Knight - Wally Pfister; Milk - Harris Savides; Revolutionary Road - Roger Deakins; Slumdog Millionaire - Anthony Dod Mantle
Best Animated Feature Film	Best Documentary Feature
**WALL-E**; Bolt; Dr. Seuss' Horton Hears a Who!; Kung Fu Panda; Waltz with Bashir	**Man on Wire**; Bigger, Stronger, Faster*; Gonzo: The Life and Work of Dr. Hunter S. Thompson; I.O.U.S.A.; Standard Operating Procedure; Young@Heart
Best Original Score	Best Original Song
**Miracle at St. Anna** - **Terence Blanchard**; The Curious Case of Benjamin Button - Alexandre Desplat; The Dark Knight - Hans Zimmer and James Newton Howard; Revolutionary Road - Thomas Newman; Slumdog Millionaire - A. R. Rahman	"**Down to Earth**" - **WALL-E**; "Another Way to Die" by The White Stripes - Quantum of Solace; "I Thought I Lost You" by Miley Cyrus and Jeffrey Steele - Bolt; "Jai Ho" by A. R. Rahman - Slumdog Millionaire; "Rock Me Sexy Jesus" by Ralph Sall - Hamlet 2; "The Wrestler" by Bruce Springsteen - The Wrestler
Best Screenplay	Best Cast
**Slumdog Millionaire** - **Simon Beaufoy**; The Curious Case of Benjamin Button - Eric Roth; The Dark Knight - Christopher Nolan and Jonathan Nolan; Doubt - John Patrick Shanley; Milk - Dustin Lance Black	**Doubt**; The Dark Knight; Milk; Rachel Getting Married; Tropic Thunder; Valkyrie
Outstanding Achievement Awards
Roger Ebert for Outstanding Achievement in Film Critiquing; Marian Luntz & the MFAH for Outstanding Film Programming; Andrea Grover & The Aurora Picture Show for Outstanding Achievement in Cinema
