= 2008 National Society of Film Critics Awards =

Annual US film awards ceremony

43rd NSFC Awards

January 3, 2009

Best Film:
Waltz with Bashir

The 43rd National Society of Film Critics Awards, given on 3 January 2009, honored the best in film for 2008.

== Winners ==
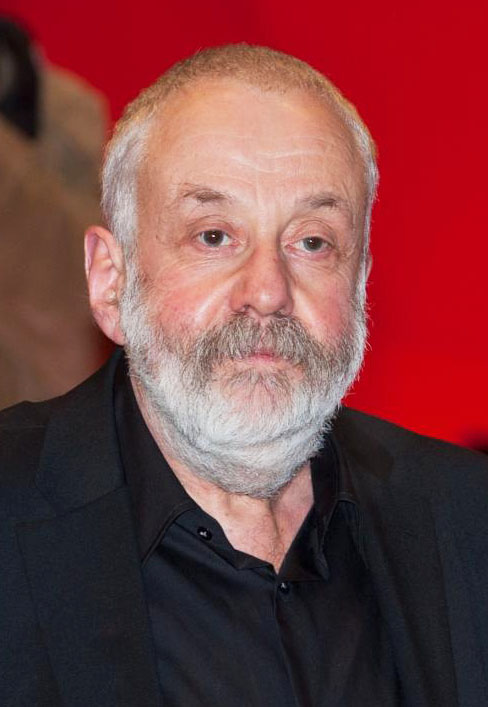
Mike Leigh, Best Director and Best Screenplay winner

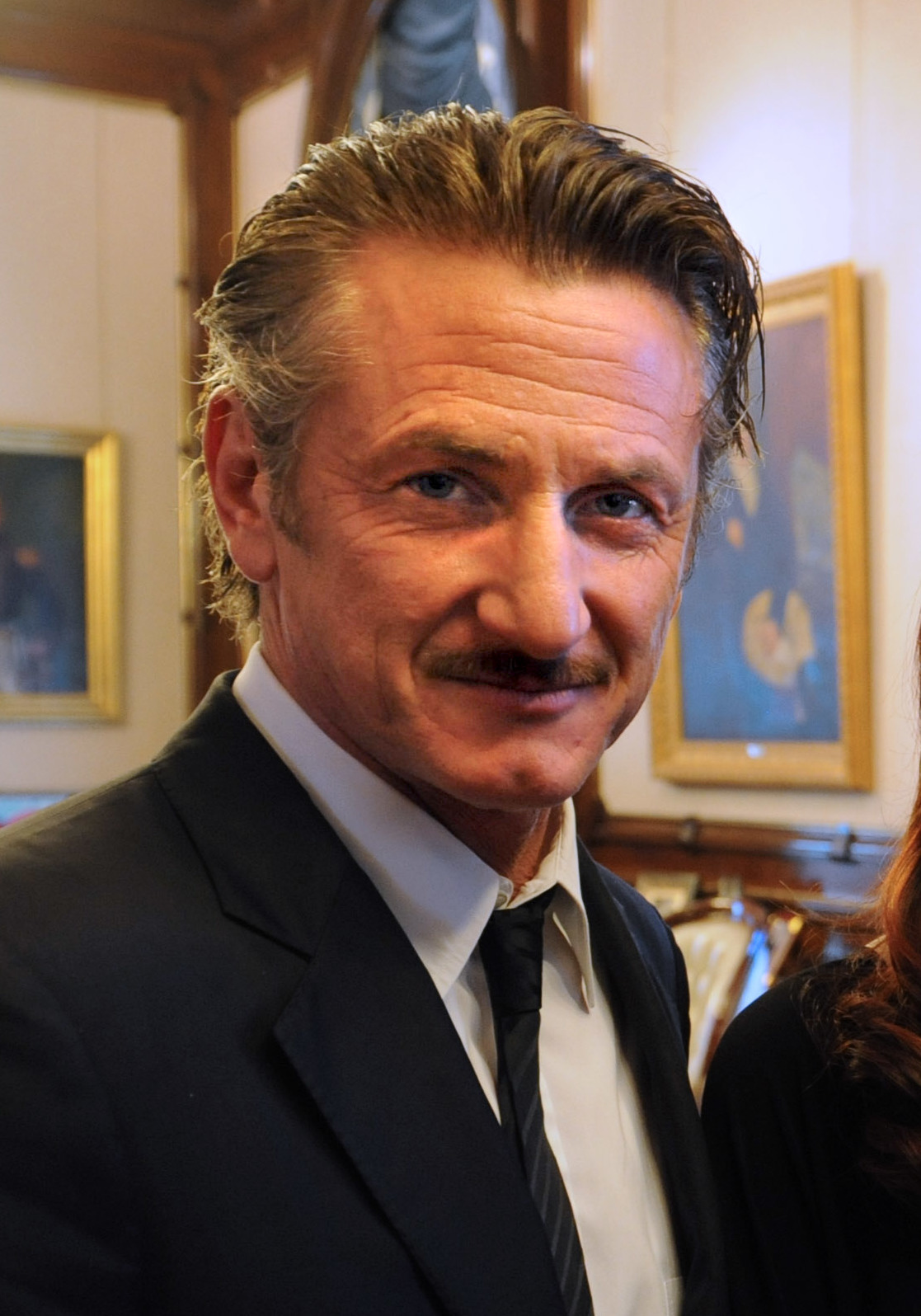
Sean Penn, Best Actor winner

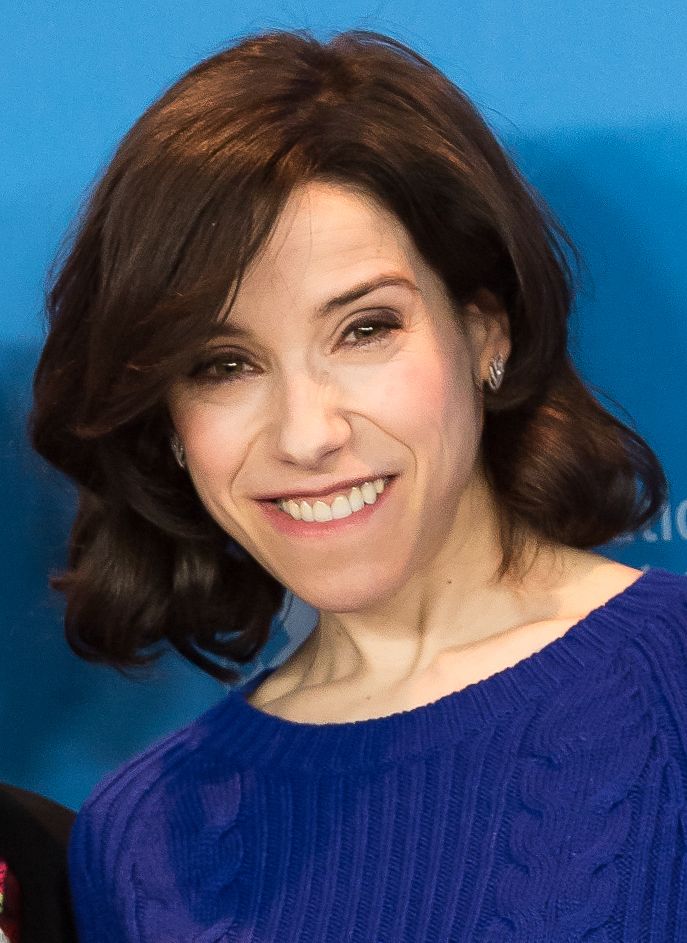
Sally Hawkins, Best Actress winner

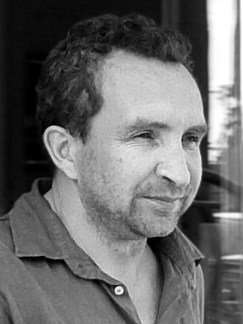
Eddie Marsan, Best Supporting Actor winner

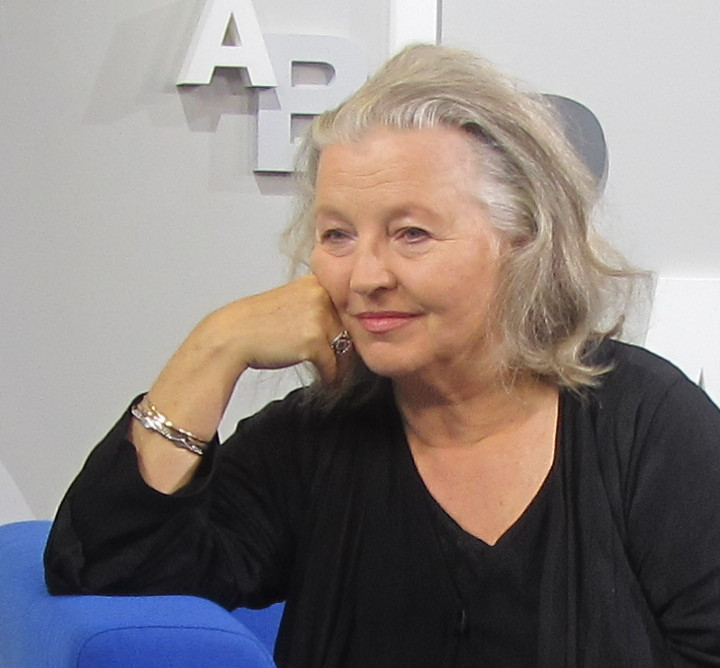
Hanna Schygulla, Best Supporting Actress winner

=== Best Picture ===
1. Waltz with Bashir (Vals Im Bashir)
2. Happy-Go-Lucky
2. WALL-E

=== Best Director ===
1. Mike Leigh – Happy-Go-Lucky
2. Gus Van Sant – Milk and Paranoid Park
3. Danny Boyle – Slumdog Millionaire

=== Best Actor ===
1. Sean Penn – Milk
2. Mickey Rourke – The Wrestler
3. Clint Eastwood – Gran Torino

=== Best Actress ===
1. Sally Hawkins – Happy-Go-Lucky
2. Melissa Leo – Frozen River
3. Michelle Williams – Wendy and Lucy

=== Best Supporting Actor ===
1. Eddie Marsan – Happy-Go-Lucky
2. Heath Ledger – The Dark Knight
3. Josh Brolin – Milk

=== Best Supporting Actress ===
1. Hanna Schygulla – The Edge of Heaven (Auf der anderen Seite)
2. Viola Davis – Doubt
3. Penélope Cruz – Vicky Cristina Barcelona

=== Best Screenplay ===
1. Mike Leigh – Happy-Go-Lucky
2. Arnaud Desplechin and Emmanuel Bourdieu – A Christmas Tale (Un conte de Noël)
3. Charlie Kaufman – Synecdoche, New York

=== Best Cinematography ===
1. Anthony Dod Mantle – Slumdog Millionaire
2. Pin Bing Lee – Flight of the Red Balloon (Le voyage du ballon rouge)
3. Wally Pfister – The Dark Knight
4. Yu Lik-wai – Still Life (Sanxia haoren)

=== Best Non-Fiction Film ===
1. Man on Wire
2. Trouble the Water
3. Encounters at the End of the World

=== Best Experimental Film ===
- Razzle Dazzle

=== Film Heritage Awards ===
1. The Criterion Collection for finally making Samuel Fuller's suppressed White Dog (1982) available to a wide American audience via DVD release.
2. The Exiles, Kent Mackenzie's realistic 1961 independent film about Native Americans in Los Angeles. (Restored by Ross Lipman of the UCLA Film and Television Archive and distributed by Milestone).
3. Flicker Alley for releasing DVD collections of rare early U.S. and foreign silent films.
4. 20th Century Fox Home Entertainment for its DVD set Murnau, Borzage and Fox.
