= National Movie Awards =

Annual British film awards from 2007 to 2011

- Awarded for: Excellence in cinematic achievements
- Location: Royal Festival Hall (2007–2008, 2010); Wembley Arena (2011)
- Country: United Kingdom
- Presented by: Alexander Armstrong (2007); James Nesbitt (2008, 2010); Christine Bleakley (2011)
- First award: 28 September 2007
- Final award: 10 May 2011
- Website: Official website

Television/radio coverage
- Network: ITV
- Produced by: Indigo Television

The National Movie Awards (NMA) was a British film awards ceremony broadcast by ITV in which the winners of the awards were chosen via popular vote. The awards were initiated in 2007 following the success of the National Television Awards, the highest-rating awards ceremony for television. The winners were voted for by the public over the internet, phone and by filling in a form which had been made available at UK cinemas.

The first three ceremonies were held at the Royal Festival Hall in London, with the fourth and final (to date) ceremony taking place at Wembley Arena, London. The awards were originally axed in 2009 but returned in 2010. They were axed again by ITV in March 2012.

== Winners and nominations ==
=== 1st NMA (2007) ===
The first award ceremony was held on 28 September 2007, presented by Alexander Armstrong. Take That performed "Rule the World", a song they recorded for the fantasy film Stardust.

Category	Winner	Nominated
Action/Adventure	Casino Royale	Die Hard 4.0; 300; Transformers
Animation	The Simpsons Movie	Flushed Away; Happy Feet; Shrek the Third
Comedy	Hot Fuzz	Borat; Mr. Bean's Holiday; Night at the Museum
Family	Harry Potter and the Order of the Phoenix	Spider-Man 3 Fantastic Four: Rise of the Silver Surfer; Pirates of the Caribbean: At World's End
Performance (Male)	Daniel Radcliffe (Harry Potter and the Order of the Phoenix)	Orlando Bloom (Pirates of the Caribbean: At World's End); Daniel Craig (Casino Royale); Johnny Depp (Pirates of the Caribbean: At World's End); Rupert Grint (Harry Potter and the Order of the Phoenix)
Performance (Female)	Emma Watson (Harry Potter and the Order of the Phoenix)	Judi Dench (Casino Royale); Eva Green (Casino Royale); Keira Knightley (Pirates of the Caribbean: At World's End); Gemma Arterton (St. Trinian's)
Special Recognition	The James Bond movies	—N/a

=== 2nd NMA (2008) ===
The second award ceremony was held on 8 September 2008, presented by James Nesbitt. It was broadcast the following night on ITV.

Category	Winner	Nominated
Action/Adventure	Indiana Jones and the Kingdom of the Crystal Skull	I Am Legend; The Mummy: Tomb of the Dragon Emperor; Wanted
Comedy	Juno	Sex And The City; St. Trinian’s; The Love Guru
Family	WALL-E	Kung Fu Panda; The Chronicles of Narnia: Prince Caspian; The Golden Compass
Musical	Mamma Mia!	Enchanted; Sweeney Todd: The Demon Barber of Fleet Street
Superhero	The Dark Knight	Iron Man; Hancock; The Incredible Hulk
Performance (Male)	Johnny Depp (Sweeney Todd: The Demon Barber of Fleet Street)	Christian Bale (The Dark Knight); Pierce Brosnan (Mamma Mia!); Will Smith (I Am Legend/Hancock)
Performance (Female)	Meryl Streep (Mamma Mia!)	Amy Adams (Enchanted); Helena Bonham Carter (Sweeney Todd: The Demon Barber of Fleet Street); Elliot Page (Note: Credited as Ellen Page) (Juno)
Special Recognition	Pixar	—N/a

=== 3rd NMA (2010) ===
The third award ceremony was held on 26 May 2010, was presented for the second time by James Nesbitt and was shown live on ITV for the first time ever (the first two ceremonies went out pre-recorded).

Category	Winner	Nominated
Action/Thriller	Sherlock Holmes	Shutter Island; Inglourious Basterds; 2012; Kick-Ass
Family	Harry Potter and the Half-Blood Prince	Up; Alvin and the Chipmunks: The Squeakquel; Nanny McPhee and the Big Bang
Fantasy	The Twilight Saga: New Moon	Alice in Wonderland; Avatar; Clash of the Titans
Vue Most Anticipated Summer Film	The Twilight Saga: Eclipse	Sex and the City 2 Toy Story 3
Breakthrough Film	The Time Traveller's Wife	Coco Before Chanel; Paranormal Activity; Harry Brown; Nativity!
Best Performance	Robert Pattinson (The Twilight Saga: New Moon)	—N/a
Special Recognition	Harry Potter	—N/a
Screen Icon	Tom Cruise	—N/a

=== 4th NMA (2011) ===
The fourth award ceremony was held on 10 May 2011, presented by Christine Bleakley. This was the final ceremony to date. JLS, Eliza Doolittle and Take That performed.

Category	Winner	Nominated
Fantasy	Harry Potter and the Deathly Hallows: Part 1	Gulliver's Travels; The Chronicles of Narnia: The Voyage of the Dawn Treader; Tron: Legacy
Drama	The King's Speech	127 Hours; Black Swan; The Social Network
Must See Film of the Summer	Harry Potter and the Deathly Hallows: Part 2	Pirates of the Caribbean: On Stranger Tides; The Hangover: Part II; X-Men: First Class
Comedy	Paul	Due Date; Just Go with It; Little Fockers
Animation	Tangled	Despicable Me; Gnomeo & Juliet; Megamind
One to Watch: Brits Going Global	Jamie Campbell Bower	Henry Cavill; Luke Evans; Andrew Garfield; Tom Hardy; Felicity Jones; Alex Pettyfer; Andrea Riseborough; Ed Westwick
Performance of the Year	Colin Firth (The King's Speech)	James Franco (127 Hours); Rupert Grint (Harry Potter and the Deathly Hallows: Part I); Daniel Radcliffe (Harry Potter and the Deathly Hallows: Part I); Emma Watson (Harry Potter and the Deathly Hallows: Part I); Jennifer Aniston (Just Go with It); Ben Barnes (The Chronicles of Narnia: The Voyage of the Dawn Treader); Georgie Henley (The Chronicles of Narnia: The Voyage of the Dawn Treader); Nick Frost (Paul); Simon Pegg (Paul); Natalie Portman (Black Swan); Helena Bonham Carter (The King's Speech); Geoffrey Rush (The King's Speech); Jesse Eisenberg (The Social Network); Jeff Bridges (Tron: Legacy / True Grit)
Screen Icon	Johnny Depp	—N/a
Special Recognition	The King's Speech	—N/a

== See also ==
- National Television Awards
