= Online Film Critics Society Awards 2008 =

12th Online Film Critics Society Awards

12th Online Film Critics Society Awards

January 19, 2009

Best Picture:
WALL-E

The 12th Online Film Critics Society Awards, honoring the best in film for 2008, were given on 19 January 2009.

== Winners and nominees ==
=== Best Picture ===
WALL-E

- The Curious Case of Benjamin Button
- The Dark Knight
- Slumdog Millionaire
- The Wrestler

=== Best Director ===
Christopher Nolan – The Dark Knight

- Darren Aronofsky – The Wrestler
- Danny Boyle – Slumdog Millionaire
- David Fincher – The Curious Case of Benjamin Button
- Andrew Stanton – WALL-E

=== Best Actor ===
Mickey Rourke – The Wrestler

- Benicio del Toro – Che
- Richard Jenkins – The Visitor
- Frank Langella – Frost/Nixon
- Sean Penn – Milk

=== Best Actress ===
Michelle Williams – Wendy and Lucy

- Anne Hathaway – Rachel Getting Married
- Sally Hawkins – Happy-Go-Lucky
- Meryl Streep – Doubt
- Kate Winslet – Revolutionary Road

=== Best Supporting Actor ===
Heath Ledger – The Dark Knight

- Robert Downey Jr. – Tropic Thunder
- Philip Seymour Hoffman – Doubt
- Eddie Marsan – Happy-Go-Lucky
- Michael Shannon – Revolutionary Road

=== Best Supporting Actress ===
Marisa Tomei – The Wrestler

- Amy Adams – Doubt
- Penélope Cruz – Vicky Cristina Barcelona
- Viola Davis – Doubt
- Kate Winslet – The Reader

=== Best Original Screenplay ===
WALL-E – Andrew Stanton & Jim Reardon

- In Bruges – Martin McDonagh
- Milk – Dustin Lance Black
- Synecdoche, New York – Charlie Kaufman
- The Wrestler – Robert D. Siegel

=== Best Adapted Screenplay ===
Let the Right One In – John Ajvide Lindqvist

- The Curious Case of Benjamin Button – Eric Roth
- The Dark Knight – Jonathan Nolan & Christopher Nolan
- Frost/Nixon – Peter Morgan
- Slumdog Millionaire – Simon Beaufoy

=== Best Foreign Language Film ===
Let the Right One In

- A Christmas Tale
- The Counterfeiters
- I've Loved You So Long
- Waltz with Bashir

=== Best Documentary ===
Man on Wire

- Dear Zachary: A Letter to a Son About His Father
- Encounters at the End of the World
- I.O.U.S.A.
- My Winnipeg

=== Best Animated Feature ===
WALL-E

- Bolt
- Dr. Seuss' Horton Hears a Who
- Kung Fu Panda
- Waltz with Bashir

=== Best Cinematography ===
The Dark Knight – Wally Pfister

- Australia – Mandy Walker
- Che – Peter Andrews
- The Fall – Colin Watkinson
- Slumdog Millionaire – Anthony Dod Mantle

=== Best Editing ===
Slumdog Millionaire – Chris Dickens

- The Curious Case of Benjamin Button – Kirk Baxter & Angus Wall
- The Dark Knight – Lee Smith
- Milk – Elliot Graham
- WALL-E – Stephen Schaffer

=== Best Original Score ===
The Dark Knight – James Newton Howard & Hans Zimmer

- The Curious Case of Benjamin Button – Alexandre Desplat
- Milk – Danny Elfman
- Slumdog Millionaire – A. R. Rahman
- WALL-E – Thomas Newman

=== Breakthrough Filmmaker ===
Tomas Alfredson – Let the Right One In

- Charlie Kaufman – Synecdoche, New York
- Kurt Kuenne – Dear Zachary: A Letter to a Son About His Father
- Martin McDonagh – In Bruges
- Steve McQueen – Hunger

=== Breakthrough Performer ===
Lina Leandersson – Let the Right One In

- Russell Brand – Forgetting Sarah Marshall
- Kåre Hedebrant – Let the Right One In
- Dev Patel – Slumdog Millionaire
- Brandon Walters – Australia
