= San Diego Film Critics Society Awards 2008 =

Annual US film awards ceremony

The 13th San Diego Film Critics Society Awards were announced on December 15, 2008.

== Winners and nominees ==
=== Best Actor ===
- Mickey Rourke – The Wrestler as Randy "The Ram" Robinson

=== Best Actress ===
- Kate Winslet –The Reader as Hanna Schmitz

=== Best Animated Film ===
- WALL-E

=== Best Cast ===
- Frost/Nixon

=== Best Cinematography ===
- Slumdog Millionaire – Anthony Dod Mantle

=== Best Director ===
- Danny Boyle – Slumdog Millionaire

=== Best Documentary Film ===
- Man on Wire

=== Best Editing ===
- Slumdog Millionaire

=== Best Film ===
- Slumdog Millionaire

=== Best Foreign Language Film ===
- Let the Right One In (Låt den rätte komma in) • Sweden

=== Best Production Design ===
- The Curious Case of Benjamin Button

=== Best Score ===
- Slumdog Millionaire – A. R. Rahman

=== Best Screenplay – Adapted ===
- Slumdog Millionaire – Simon Beaufoy

=== Best Screenplay – Original ===
- The Visitor – Tom McCarthy

=== Best Supporting Actor ===
- Heath Ledger – The Dark Knight as The Joker (posthumous)

=== Best Supporting Actress ===
- Marisa Tomei – The Wrestler as Cassidy/Pam
