= San Francisco Film Critics Circle Awards 2008 =

Annual US film awards ceremony

7th SFFCC Awards

December 15, 2008

Best Picture:
Milk

The 7th San Francisco Film Critics Circle Awards, honoring the best in film for 2008, were given on 15 December 2008.

== Winners ==
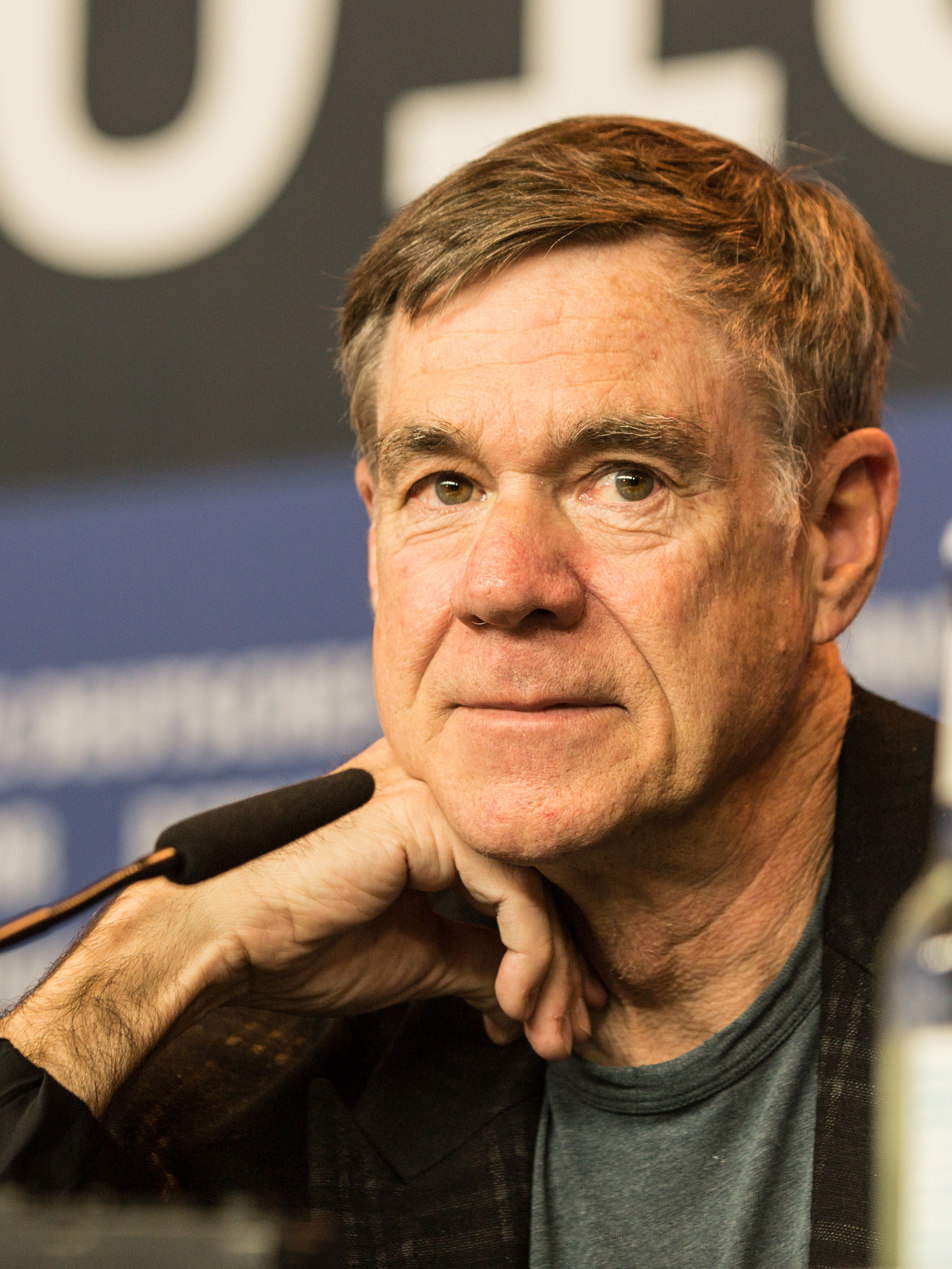
Gus Van Sant, Best Director winner

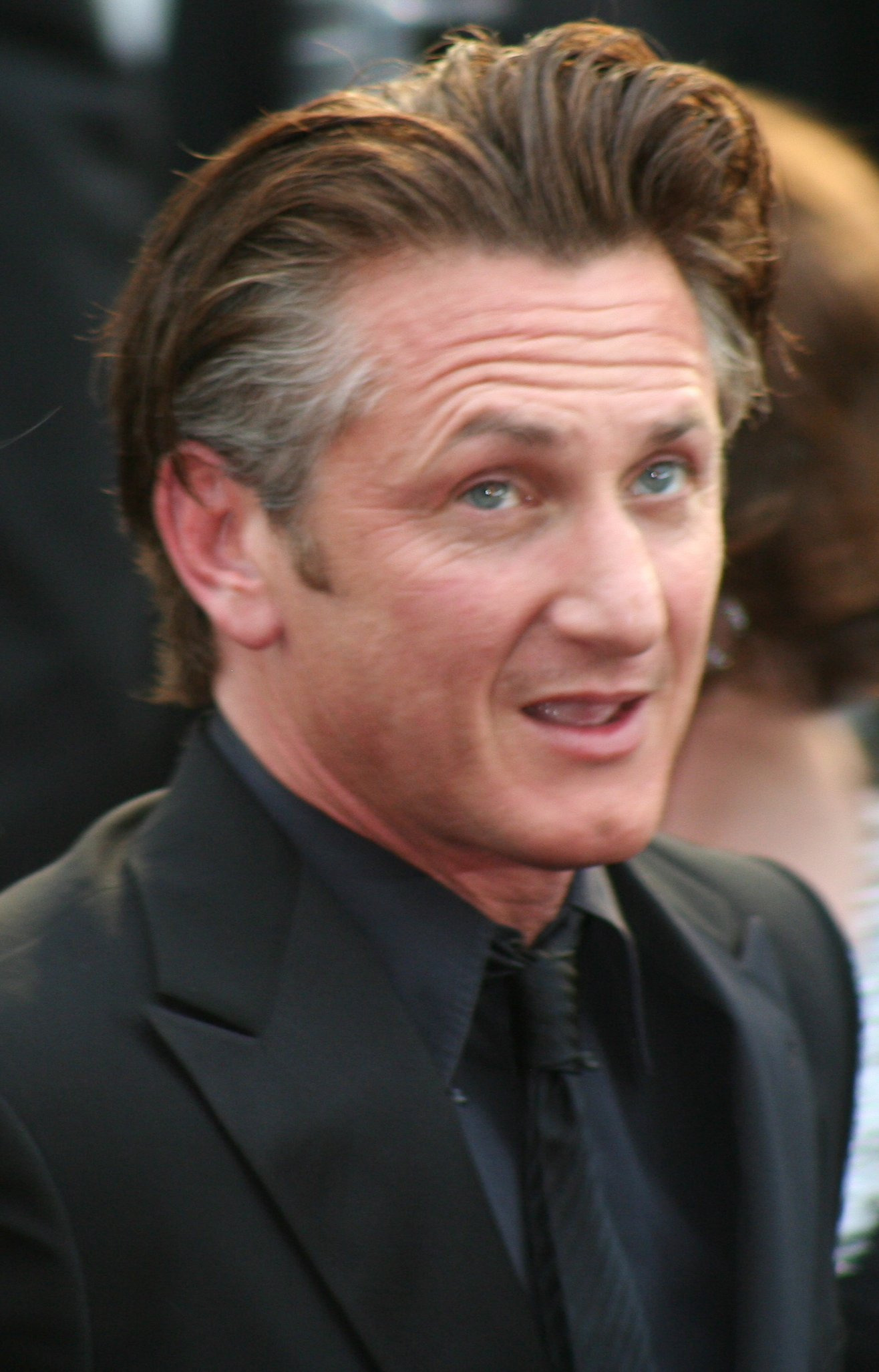
Sean Penn, Best Actor co-winner

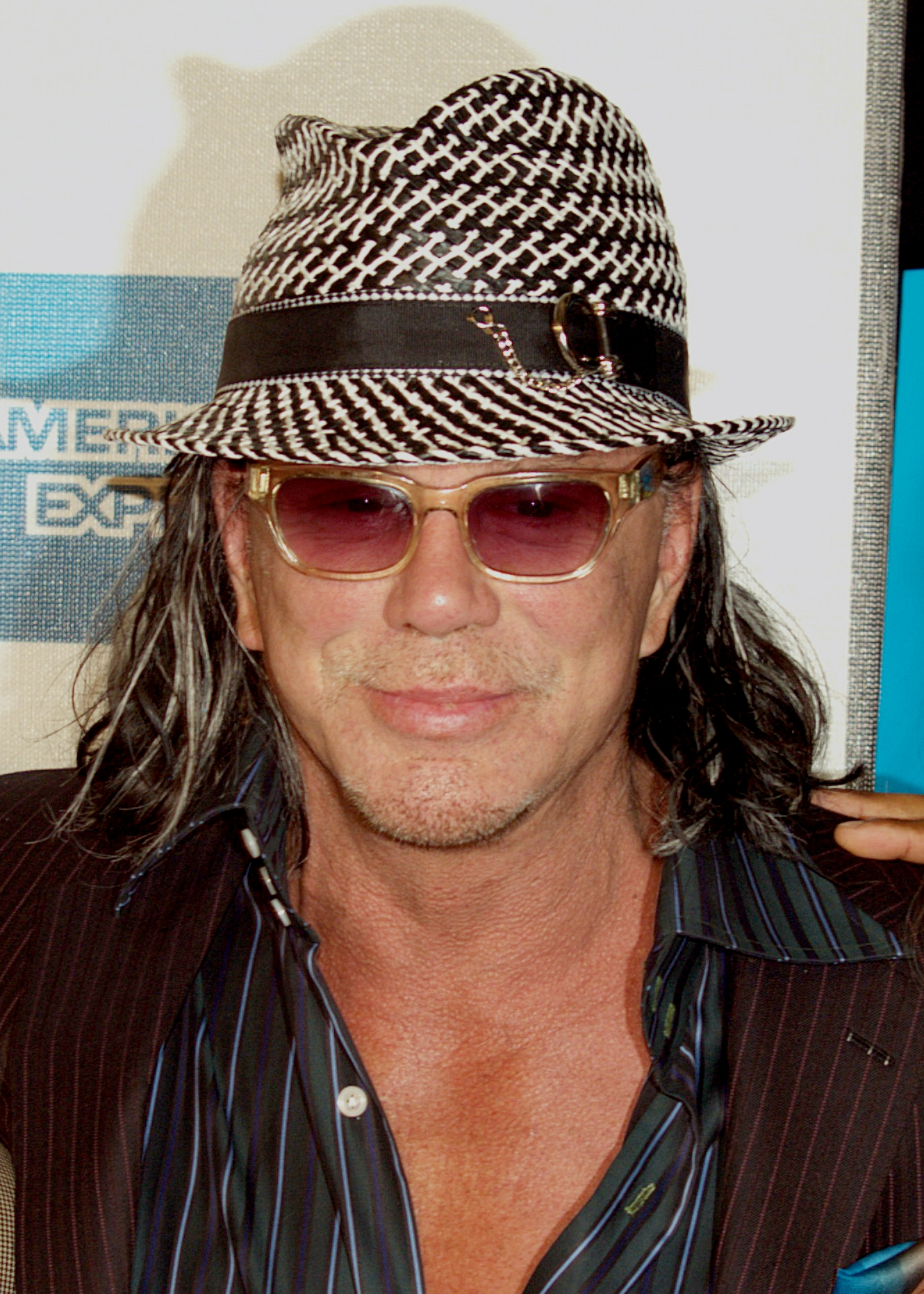
Mickey Rourke, Best Actor co-winner

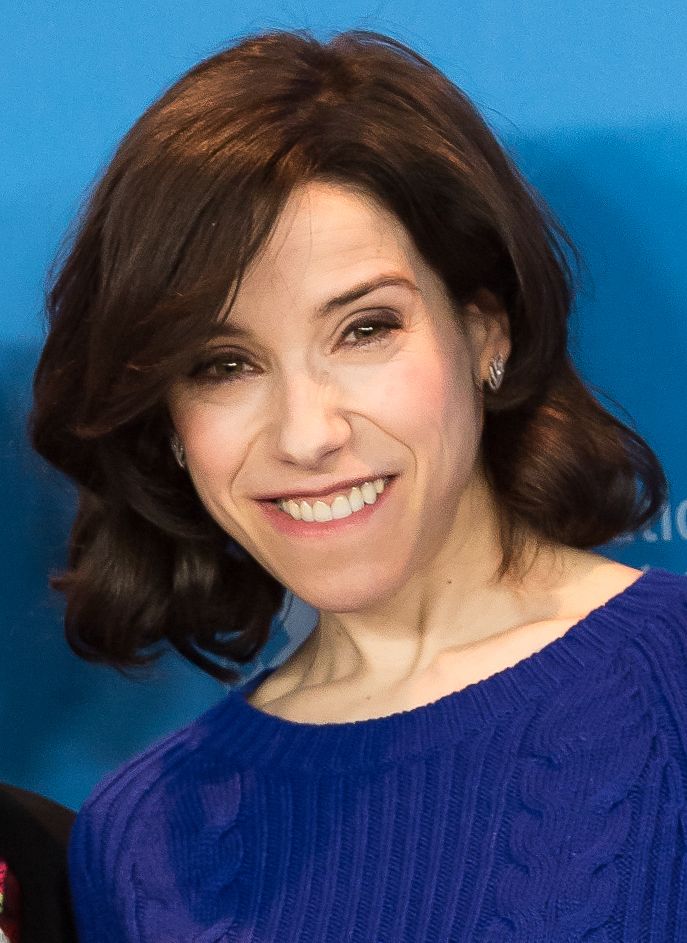
Sally Hawkins, Best Actress winner

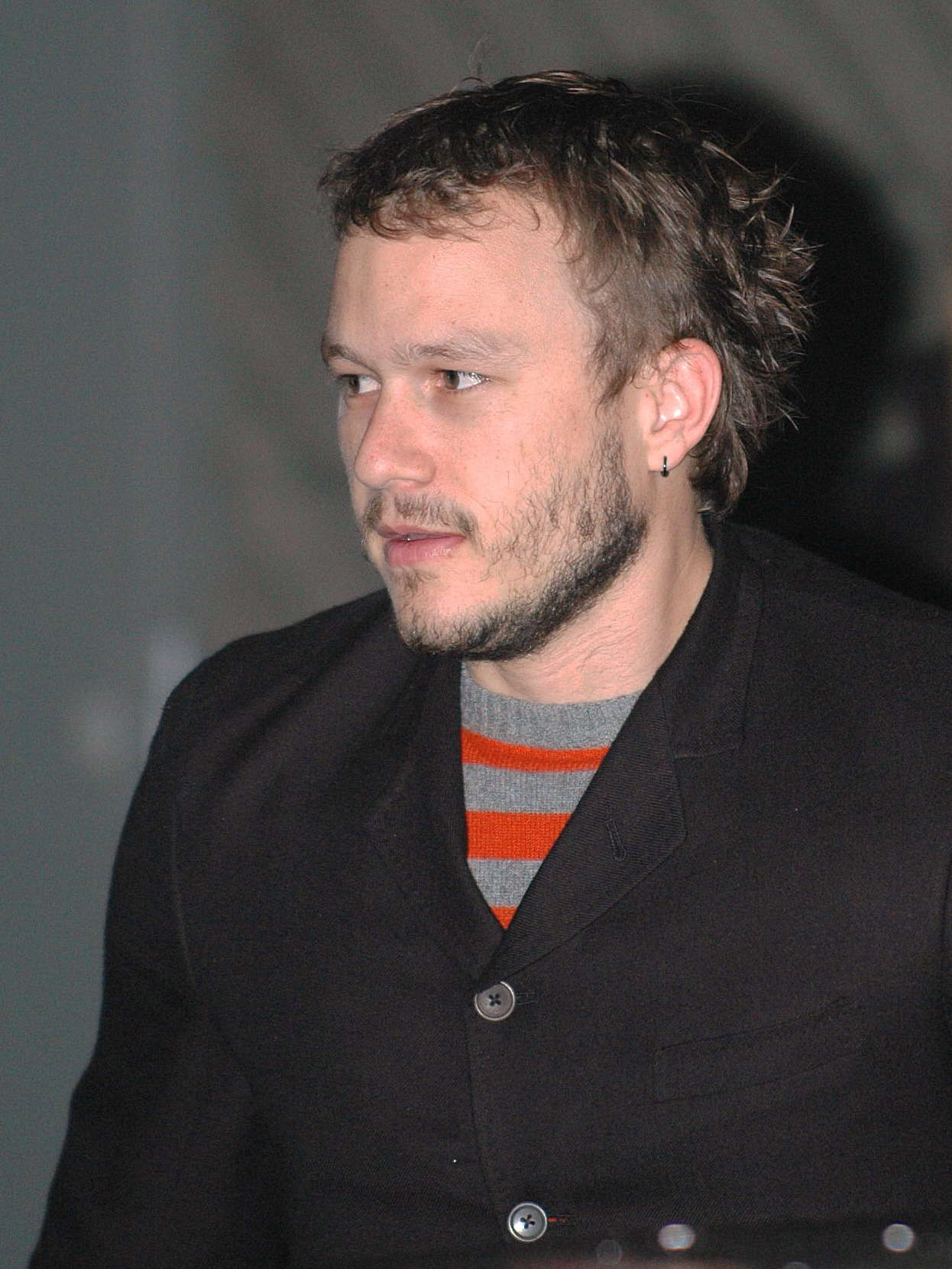
Heath Ledger, Best Supporting Actor winner

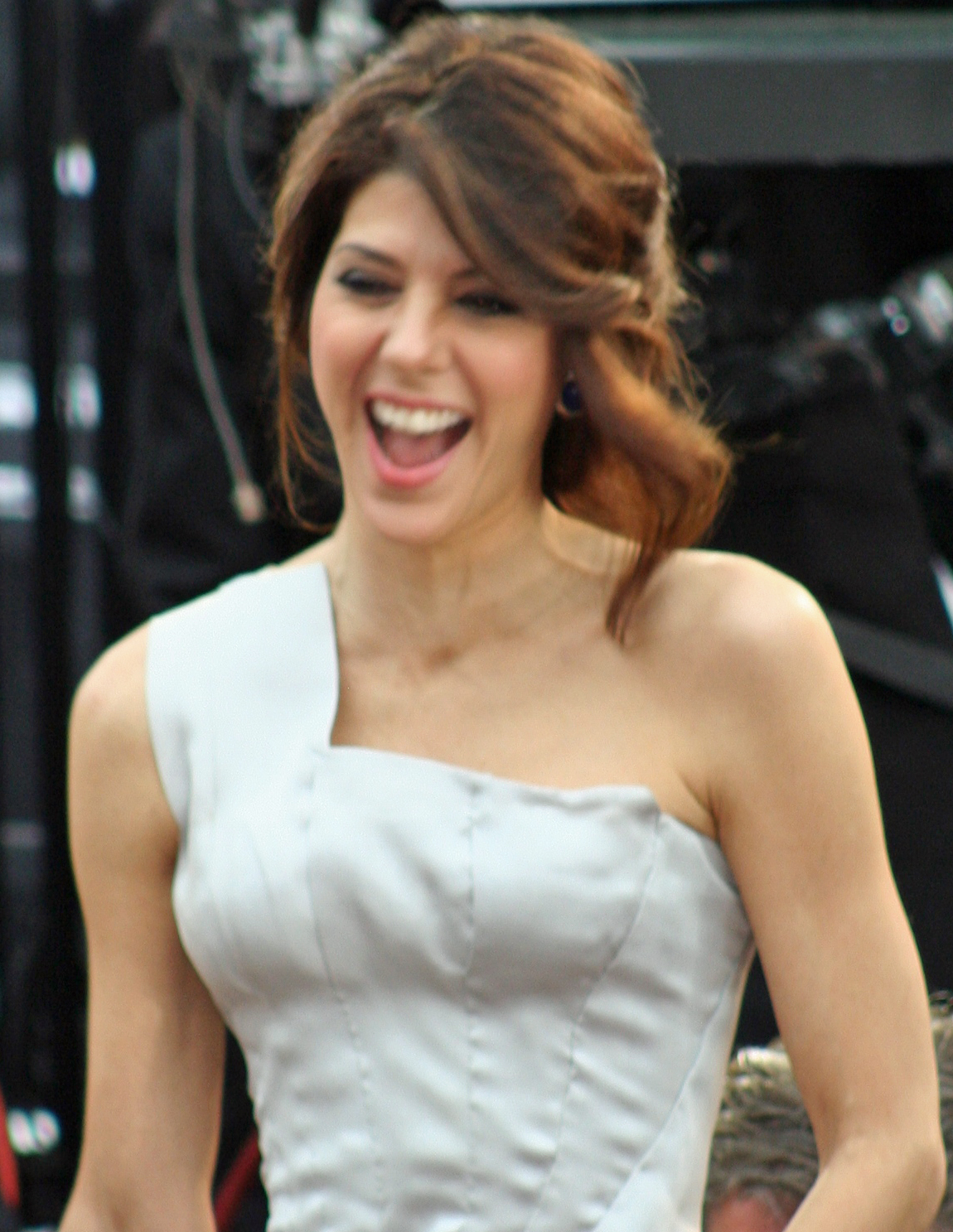
Marisa Tomei, Best Supporting Actress winner

- Best Picture:
  - Milk
- Best Director:
  - Gus Van Sant – Milk
- Best Original Screenplay:
  - Milk – Dustin Lance Black
- Best Adapted Screenplay:
  - Frost/Nixon – Peter Morgan
- Best Actor (tie):
  - Sean Penn – Milk
  - Mickey Rourke – The Wrestler
- Best Actress:
  - Sally Hawkins – Happy-Go-Lucky
- Best Supporting Actor:
  - Heath Ledger – The Dark Knight
- Best Supporting Actress:
  - Marisa Tomei – The Wrestler
- Best Foreign Language Film:
  - Let the Right One In (Låt den rätte komma in) • Sweden
- Best Documentary:
  - My Winnipeg
- Best Cinematography:
  - The Dark Knight – Wally Pfister
- Marlon Riggs Award (for courage & vision in the Bay Area film community):
  - Rob Nilsson – 9@Night
