= The Wrestler (2008 film) =

2008 film by Darren Aronofsky

- Theatrical release poster
- Directed by: Darren Aronofsky
- Written by: Robert Siegel
- Produced by: Darren Aronofsky; Scott Franklin
- Starring: Mickey Rourke; Marisa Tomei; Evan Rachel Wood
- Cinematography: Maryse Alberti
- Edited by: Andrew Weisblum
- Music by: Clint Mansell
- Production companies: Wild Bunch; Protozoa Pictures
- Distributed by: Fox Searchlight Pictures (United States); Wild Bunch (International)
- Release dates: September 5, 2008 (Venice); December 17, 2008 (United States)
- Running time: 109 minutes
- Country: United States
- Language: English
- Budget: $6 million
- Box office: $46.6 million

The Wrestler is a 2008 American sports drama film directed by Darren Aronofsky and written by Robert Siegel. The film stars Mickey Rourke, Marisa Tomei, and Evan Rachel Wood. Rourke plays an aging professional wrestler who, despite his failing health and waning fame, continues to wrestle due to financial hardship and in an attempt to cling to the success of his 1980s heyday. He also tries to mend his relationship with his estranged daughter and to find romance with a woman who works as a stripper.

The Wrestler premiered at the 65th Venice International Film Festival on September 5, 2008 before being released by Fox Searchlight Pictures on December 17, 2008. The film grossed $44.7 million against a $6 million budget and received critical acclaim and won the Golden Lion Award at the 65th Venice International Film Festival. The success of the film revitalized Rourke's career and he went on to win a Golden Globe, a British Academy Film Award, an Independent Spirit Award as well as an Oscar nomination for Best Actor. Tomei also received an Academy Award nomination for Best Supporting Actress.

== Plot ==
In the 1980s, professional wrestler Robin Ramzinski, better known by his ring name Randy "The Ram" Robinson, rises to prominence. In the 2000s, now past his prime, he wrestles on weekends for independent promotions in New Jersey, resides in a trailer park, and works part-time at a supermarket, with his manager Wayne repeatedly disparaging his background. A regular patron at a strip club named Cheeques, he befriends a stripper named Pam, better known by her stage name Cassidy. After winning a local match, he agrees to a proposed 20th-anniversary rematch with his most notable opponent, "The Ayatollah", viewing it as a potential return to stardom.

Randy intensifies his training, which includes anabolic steroid injections. After wrestling in a hardcore match, he suffers a heart attack backstage and undergoes coronary artery bypass surgery. Upon awakening, he is instructed by his doctor to refrain from further taking steroids and continuing his career, as his heart can no longer handle the exertion. Reluctantly, he decides to retire and begins working a full-time shift at the supermarket's deli counter.

Cassidy recommends that Randy attempt to rebuild his relationship with his estranged young-adult daughter Stephanie, whom he had abandoned when she was a child; he visits her residence, but she rebuffs him because he was unavailable to properly raise her. While accompanying him in purchasing a gift for Stephanie, Cassidy discloses that she has a 9-year-old son named Jameson, but she rejects his attempts to romance her because her occupation forbids romantic affairs with customers. Later, he re-encounters Stephanie, gives her the present he purchased and apologizes for forsaking her and her mother years earlier to focus on his own career. The two reconnect over a visit to a beachfront boardwalk, where he often took her when she was young, and agree to meet for dinner at a restaurant on the coming Saturday.

A few days later, Randy encounters Cassidy at Cheeques and compliments her for reconnecting him with Stephanie, but she declines his offer to purchase her a drink, resulting in a heated confrontation between the two. Upset, he attends a wrestling match and commiserates with his fellow wrestlers. While conversing with them at a nearby bar, he becomes massively inebriated, consumes heavy amounts of cocaine, partakes in sexual intercourse with a female follower in the women's restroom, and awakens in her bedroom the following morning. Exhausted, he sleeps the entire day away, awakening that night to discover that he has overlooked his appointment with Stephanie. He ventures to her residence in the middle of the night and apologizes to her for neglecting their date, but having tearfully reached her breaking point with him, she instead disowns him permanently and coldly ejects him from the house.

The next day, at the deli counter, a patron identifies Randy, though he persistently denies it. Agitated, he damages his own hand on the slicer, wipes the blood over himself and immediately quits his job on the spot, insulting Wayne and the nearby customers before departing. Spurred by the fan's recognition of him, he wholly recommits to wrestling and reschedules the rematch. He re-encounters Cassidy, who has just walked out on her job after learning of Randy returning to his career, and reconciles with her. She implores him to cancel the event and retire from wrestling permanently so as to give the outside world a second chance, but he respectfully declines; explaining that he belongs in the ring with his fellow wrestlers and devoted fans who, unlike the rest of society, have always accepted and respected him for who he is throughout his life.

During the match, the Ayatollah notices an increasingly-unsteady Randy developing excruciating chest pains, urging him to initiate the pin and conclude the match to salvage the remnants of his declining health. Randy courageously declines, however, and proceeds to steal one of the Ayatollah's signature moves before mounting the top rope. Surveying the crowd, he realizes that Cassidy has taken leave from the arena. With his heart approaching myocardial rupture, he tearfully smiles upon hearing the sound of his fans cheering his name, and prepares to execute his signature finishing move, a diving headbutt termed the "Ram Jam". He leaps from the top rope and the screen fades to black.

== Cast ==
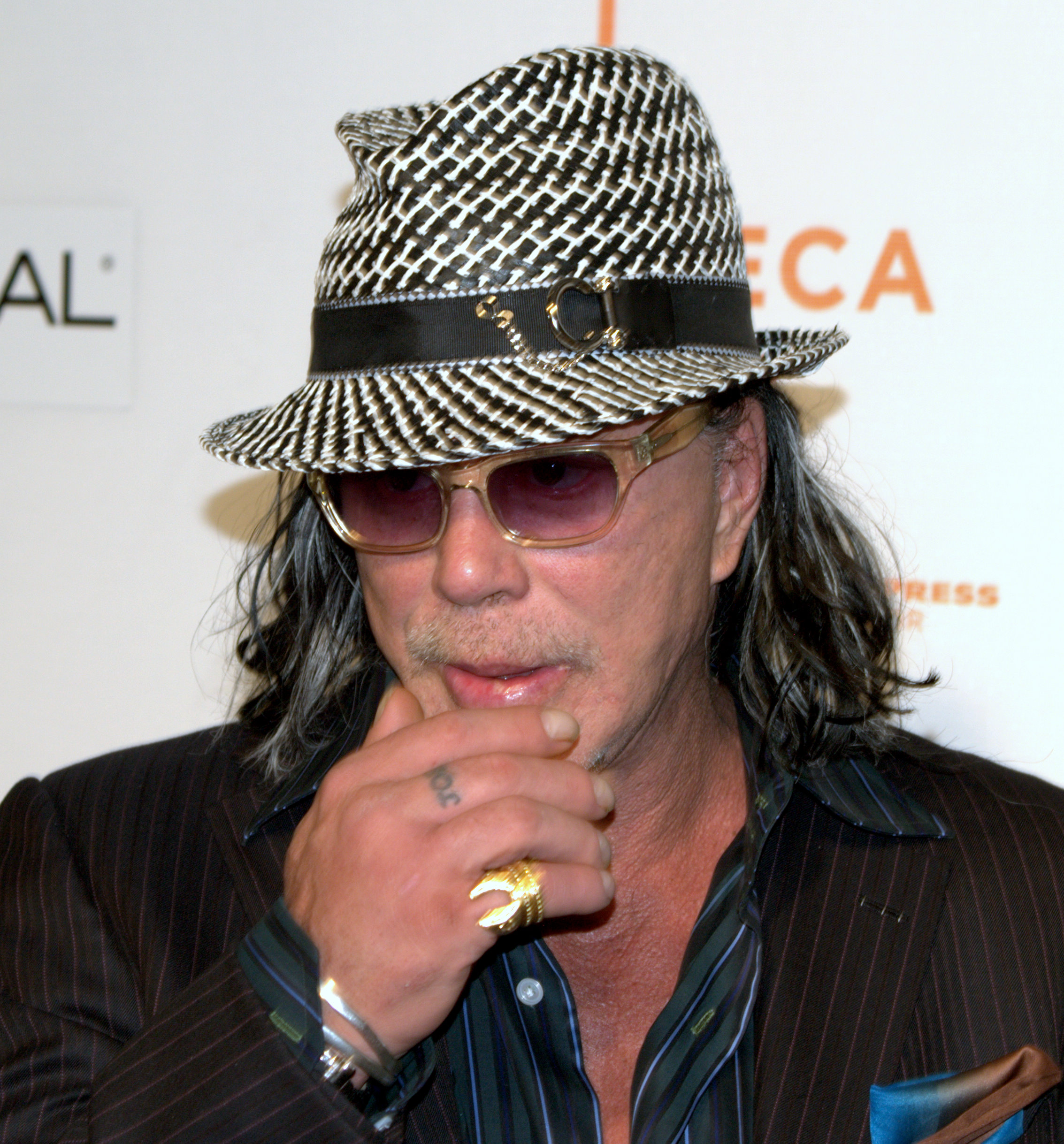
Rourke's performance in the film gave renewed interest to his career.

- Mickey Rourke as Robin Ramzinski / Randy "The Ram" Robinson
- Marisa Tomei as Pam / Cassidy
- Evan Rachel Wood as Stephanie Ramzinski
- Mark Margolis as Lenny
- Todd Barry as Wayne
- Judah Friedlander as Scott Brumberg
- Ernest Miller as Bob / 'The Ayatollah'
- Ajay Naidu as Medic
- Wass Stevens as Nick Volpe
- John D'Leo as Adam

Professional wrestlers who appeared in the film include: Robbie E, Necro Butcher, Nick Berk, The Blue Meanie, Sabian, Nate Hatred, Ron Killings, L.A. Smooth, Jay Lethal, Johnny Valiant, Jim Powers, Austin Aries, Claudio Castagnoli, Larry Sweeney, Paul E. Normous, Romeo Roselli, John Zandig, Chuck Taylor, Nigel McGuinness, D. J. Hyde, Kit Cope, Drew Gulak, Bobby Dempsey, Judas Young, Pappadon, and Jay Santana.

== Production ==
=== Development ===
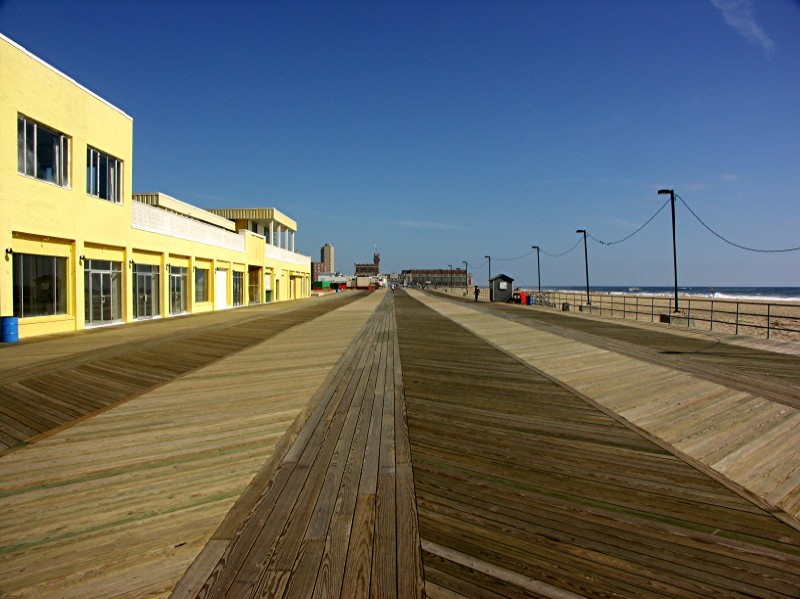
Scenes where Rourke and Wood's characters try to bond were filmed on the Asbury Park boardwalk.

The Wrestler was written by Robert D. Siegel, a former writer for The Onion, and entered development at director Darren Aronofsky's company Protozoa Pictures. Nicolas Cage entered talks to star in October 2007. He left the project a month later, with Mickey Rourke replacing him. According to Aronofsky, Cage pulled out of the movie because Aronofsky wanted Rourke as the lead character. He said in a 2008 interview with /Film, "[Cage] was a complete gentleman, and he understood that my heart was with Mickey and he stepped aside. I have so much respect for Nic Cage as an actor and I think it really could have worked with Nic but [...] Nic was incredibly supportive of Mickey and he is old friends with Mickey and really wanted to help with this opportunity, so he pulled himself out of the race." However, Cage denied Aronofsky's account in a 2009 interview with Access Hollywood and explained, "I wasn't 'dropped' from the movie. I resigned from the movie because I didn't think I had enough time to achieve the look of the wrestler who was on steroids, which I would never do."

Rourke was initially reluctant when first approached for the lead role, later stating, "I didn't really care for the script, but I wanted to work with Darren and I kind of thought that whoever wrote the script hadn't spent as much time as I had around these kind of people and he wouldn't have spoken the way the dude was speaking. And so Darren let me rewrite all my parts and he put the periods in and crossed the T's. So once we made that change, I was okay with it."

Wrestler Hulk Hogan claimed in 2012 on The Howard Stern Show that he was also offered the lead role, and that he turned down the role because he felt he was not the right man to portray the character. Aronofsky disputed these claims and tweeted that "the role of the Wrestler was always [Rourke's]; it was never Hulk Hogan's as he claims on [The Howard Stern Show]".

=== Filming ===
The film's shoot began in January 2008 and lasted approximately 40 days, with filming taking place on 16mm film using some areas of New York City but primarily New Jersey locations such as Asbury Park, Bayonne (in a supermarket where Rourke served and improvised with real customers), Dover, Elizabeth, Garfield, Hasbrouck Heights, Linden, Rahway, and Roselle Park. Scenes were also shot at The Arena in Philadelphia.

Afa Anoa'i, a former professional wrestler, was hired to train Rourke for his role. He brought his two main trainers, Jon Trosky and Tom Farra, to work with Rourke for eight weeks. Both trainers also have parts in the film.

One scene features a fictional Nintendo Entertainment System video game called Wrestle Jam '88, featuring the characters of Robinson and The Ayatollah. Aronofsky requested a fully functioning game for the actors to play. Programmer Randall Furino and the film's title designer Kristyn Hume created a playable demo with a working interface and AI routines that also featured 1980s era-appropriate graphics and music.

To add more realism, the locker room scenes were improvised. Some of the supermarket deli scenes were also improvised.

Marisa Tomei was made to do 36 takes to get her pole dancing right.

The final match of the film was filmed during a two-day Ring of Honor event titled Double Feature which took place at the Baker Building in Dover, New Jersey.

=== Music ===
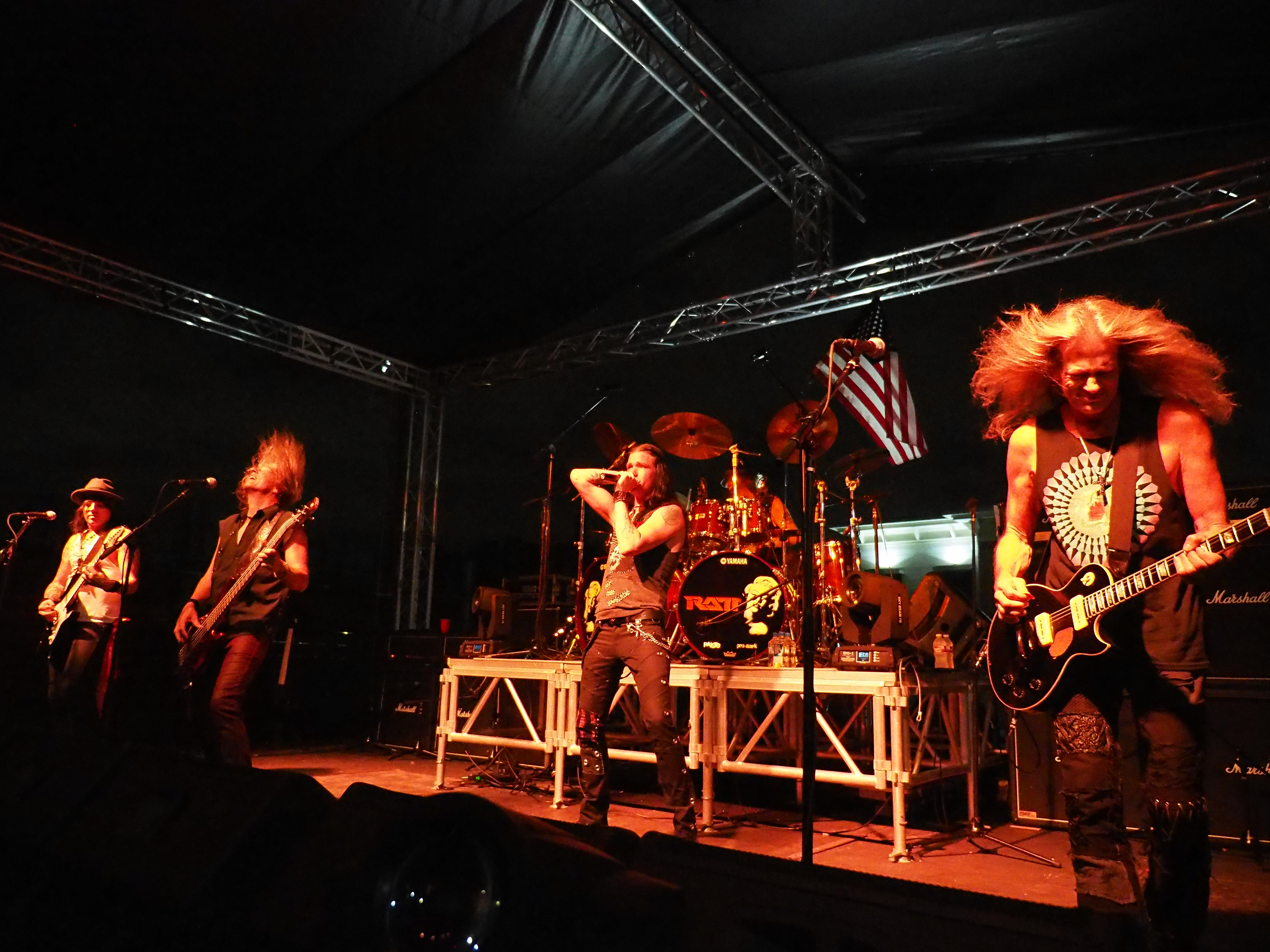
Unlike Aronofsky's previous films—which featured original scores by Clint Mansell—The Wrestler has a soundtrack of pre-recorded pop music, most of it glam metal acts such as Ratt.

Clint Mansell, the composer for Aronofsky's previous films, π, Requiem for a Dream, and The Fountain, reprised his role as composer for The Wrestler. Slash played the guitars on the score. A new Bruce Springsteen song, also titled "The Wrestler", plays over the film's closing credits. Springsteen wrote the song while on tour in Europe after receiving a letter and a copy of the script from Rourke.

The Guns N' Roses song "Sweet Child o' Mine" is played during Randy's entrance at the end of the film. In his Golden Globe Award acceptance speech, Rourke mentioned that Axl Rose donated the song for free due to the film's modest budget, and the film's closing credits thank Rose for this. Rourke had also used the same song as his intro music during his stint as a boxer in the early 1990s. In the film, Randy mocks Kurt Cobain, one of Rose's biggest rivals during the early 1990s.

Also featured in the film are the Ratt songs "Round and Round" and "I'm Insane", the Quiet Riot song "Metal Health" (which is Randy's entrance song except for the last match), the FireHouse song "Don't Walk Away", the Slaughter song "Dangerous", the Scorpions song "Animal Magnetism", the Accept song "Balls to the Wall", the Rhino Bucket song "Soundtrack to a War", and the Cinderella song "Don't Know What You Got (Till It's Gone)". The two Ratt tunes are actually recordings by Rat Attack, a project featuring Ratt lead singer Stephen Pearcy and guitarists George Lynch and Tracii Guns. The Madonna song "Jump" is played in the bar scene. The Birdman and Lil Wayne song "Stuntin' Like My Daddy" can be heard in the strip club. Also in the film is a song called "Let Your Freak Out" by Deesha, which can be heard during the strip club scene where Pam rebuffs Randy at the club after their date at the thrift shop.

In the Toronto International Film Festival interview conducted by James Rocchi, Aronofsky credited the 1957 Charles Mingus song "The Clown" (an instrumental piece with a poem read over the music about a clown who accidentally discovers the bloodlust of the crowds and eventually kills himself in performance) as a major source of inspiration for the movie. Aronofsky also said the brief reprise of U.S. senator and one-time presidential candidate John McCain's "Bomb bomb Iran" to the tune of The Beach Boys' "Barbara Ann" in the movie evolved as improvisation on the set. The Ayatollah wrestling character's persona had developed more than 20 years before but, in part through this musical moment and its connection with the character, came to still feel appropriate to Aronofsky in 2008.

== Release ==
Darren Aronofsky, Mickey Rourke, and Evan Rachel Wood discussing The Wrestler

On September 8, 2008, Fox Searchlight Pictures closed a deal for U.S. distribution rights to the film worth about $4 million in a competitive situation that reportedly also included Lionsgate, Overture Films, Sony Pictures Classics, the Weinstein Company, Focus Features, IFC Films, Summit Entertainment, Miramax Films, New Line Cinema, and Paramount Pictures; it received a limited release on December 17, 2008, and was released nationwide on January 23, 2009. It was released on DVD and Blu-ray Disc on April 21, 2009, in the United States.

Wild Bunch handled the film's international sales. Remstar Media Partners acquired Canadian rights to the movie in September 2008 while Optimum Releasing acquired British distribution rights. The company released the film in the UK on January 16, 2009.

=== Promotion ===
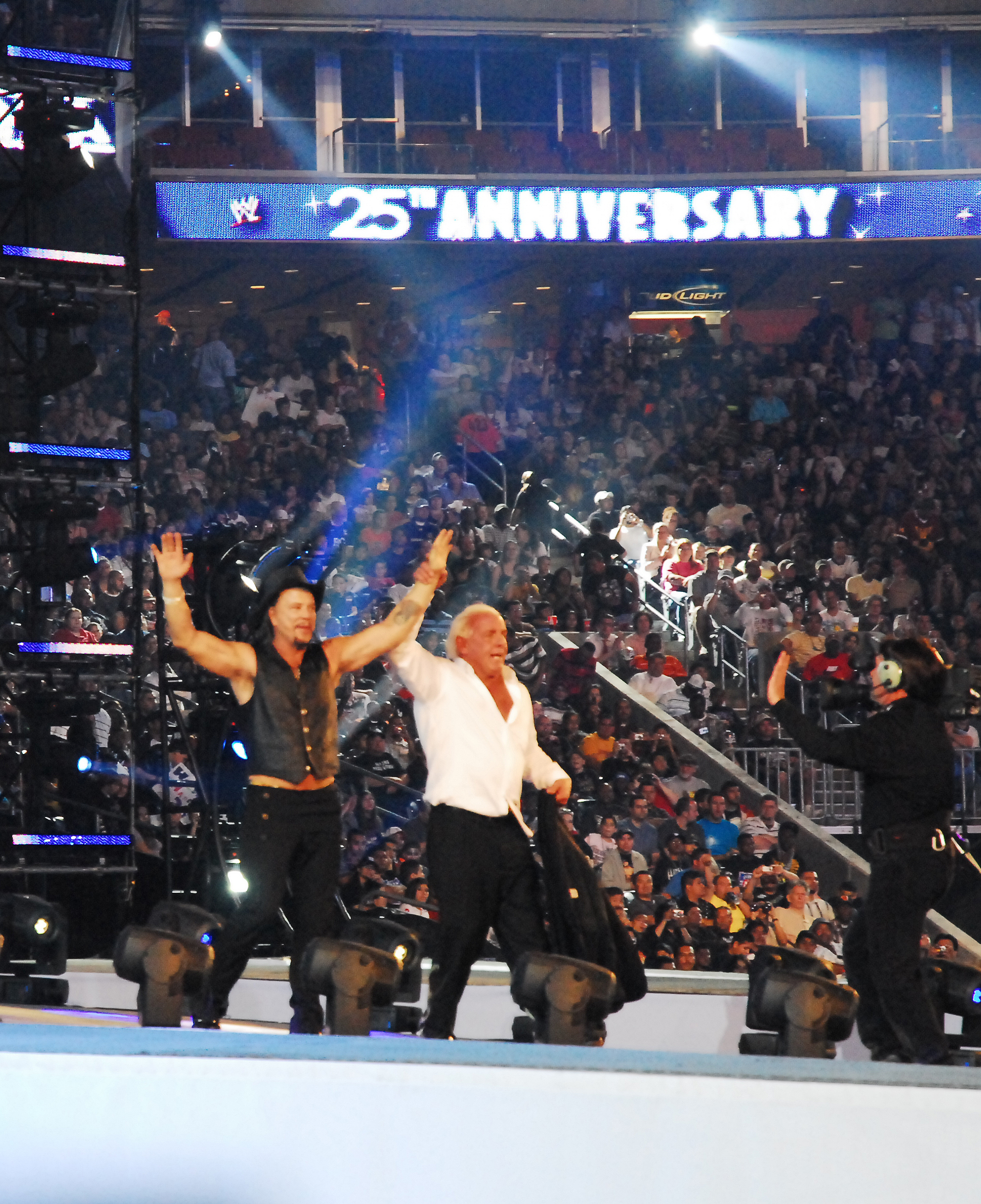
Rourke with Ric Flair during an appearance at WrestleMania 25 to promote The Wrestler.

WWE helped promote the film through an on-screen angle (a fictional storyline used in wrestling). This involved the heel Chris Jericho criticizing legendary retired wrestlers such as Ric Flair, whom he felt were embarrassing themselves, as well as Mickey Rourke for his portrayal in The Wrestler. At the 15th Screen Actors Guild Awards, Rourke announced he would be competing at WrestleMania 25, specifically targeting Jericho. The announcement led to a confrontation between the two on Larry King Live, which showed signs of second thoughts from Rourke. On January 28, it was announced through Rourke's spokesperson that the actor would not compete at WrestleMania, and he was soon after announced instead as a guest.

Rourke was also invited to the 2009 WWE Hall of Fame induction ceremony the night before WrestleMania. The angle culminated the following night where Jericho faced Ricky Steamboat, Roddy Piper, and Jimmy Snuka in a handicap match. After his victory, Jericho dismantled Flair and challenged Rourke, who finally entered the ring and punched him out. Flair then congratulated Rourke.

== Reception ==
=== Film critics ===
The Wrestler received universal acclaim. Rotten Tomatoes reported that 99% of critics gave the film positive reviews based upon a sample of 229 reviews, with an average rating of 8.5/10. The critical consensus states, "Mickey Rourke gives a performance for the ages in The Wrestler, a richly affecting, heart-wrenching yet ultimately rewarding drama." At Metacritic, which assigns a rating out of 100 to reviews from mainstream critics, the film has received an average score of 80, based on 36 reviews, signifying "generally favorable reviews". Alonso Duralde, of MSNBC, said, "Rourke's work transcends mere stunt-casting; his performance is a howl of pain that seems to come from a very real place."

Todd McCarthy, of Variety, said, "Rourke creates a galvanizing, humorous, deeply moving portrait that instantly takes its place among the great, iconic screen performances." Ben Mankiewicz, from At the Movies, said, "To put it simply, this is the best film I've seen this year." Le Monde praised the film for melding European film style with an American plot, and stated that "Mickey Rourke's performance in The Wrestler is a continuous celebration of the burdens and splendors of the profession of performance." One other French film critic, Philippe Azoury, praised its portrayal of "the American heartland" as what he viewed as a bleak wasteland.

Although The Wrestler was not technically in Roger Ebert's "Best Films" list, he includes a note at the bottom of his review: "'The Wrestler' is one of the year's best films. It wasn't on my 'best films' list for complicated and boring reasons."

=== Professional wrestling industry ===
Roddy Piper was one of several professional wrestlers to voice his approval for the film and was later featured on a Blu-ray extra commenting on its authenticity.

Prominent wrestling figures have commented on the film. During an NPR interview, Aronofsky remarked on WWE chairman Vince McMahon's feelings on The Wrestler:

Vince McMahon saw the film and he called both me and Mickey (Rourke) and he was really, really touched by it. It happened a week ago. We were very nervous wondering what he would think, but he really, really felt the film was special. Having his support meant a lot to us, especially Mickey.

WWE Hall of Famer Bret "The Hitman" Hart, who was a multi-time world champion in both WWE and WCW, enjoyed The Wrestler and applauded Rourke's "clairvoyant" performance, but called the film a "dark misinterpretation" of the business. He asserted: "Randy 'The Ram' Robinson was a main-eventer who sold out Madison Square Garden. So was I ... Although the film speaks superbly to the speed bumps all pro wrestlers navigate, I'm happy to report most of us don't swerve off the road quite so severely." WWE play-by-play commentator Jim Ross called it a "really strong, dramatic film that depicts how people who are obsessed with their own lives and their careers can self-destruct".

Former WWE and TNA world champion Mick Foley enjoyed the film, saying: "Within five [minutes], I had completely forgotten I was looking at Mickey Rourke. That guy on the screen simply was Randy 'the Ram' Robinson." WWE Hall of Famer "Rowdy" Roddy Piper was said to have been highly emotional after watching a screening of the film. Aronofsky said of Piper: "He loved it. He broke down and cried in Mickey's arms, so he was psyched that this story was finally told." Insights on the film from Roddy Piper and other former pro wrestlers can be seen in Fox Searchlight Pictures' "Wrestler Round Table", which was included on the Blu-ray release of the film.

Professional wrestler Hulk Hogan alleged that he was offered the part of Randy 'the Ram' Anderson and turned it down. However, film director Darren Aronofsky later openly denied Hogan's allegation, stating he never considered him for the part.

Jim Cornette and Dutch Mantel both openly disliked the movie. Both claimed it gave an inaccurate view on the business.

=== Controversy in Iran ===
In March 2009, Javad Shamaqdari, cultural adviser to the-then Iranian President Mahmoud Ahmadinejad, demanded an apology from a delegation of Academy of Motion Picture Arts and Sciences actors and producers visiting Iran for what he characterized as negative and unfair portrayals of Iran in The Wrestler and other Hollywood films.

=== Top ten lists ===
The film appeared on many critics' top ten lists of the best films of 2008.

- 1st – Matt Cale, Ruthless Reviews
- 1st – Ben Mankiewicz, At the Movies
- 1st – Joshua Rothkopf, Time Out
- 1st – Owen Gleiberman, Entertainment Weekly
- 2nd – Marc Doyle, Metacritic
- 2nd – Peter Hartlaub, San Francisco Chronicle
- 3rd – Anthony Lane, The New Yorker
- 3rd – Marc Savlov, The Austin Chronicle
- 3rd – Peter Vonder Haar, Film Threat
- 4th – Richard Roeper, Chicago Sun-Times
- 4th – Ben Lyons, At the Movies
- 4th – David Denby, The New Yorker
- 5th – James Berardinelli, ReelViews
- 5th – Mick LaSalle, San Francisco Chronicle
- 6th – Ty Burr, The Boston Globe
- 7th – David Ansen, Newsweek
- 7th – Ray Bennett, The Hollywood Reporter
- 7th – V.A. Musetto, New York Post
- 8th – Premiere
- 8th – Nathan Rabin, The A.V. Club
- 9th – Elizabeth Weitzman, New York Daily News
- 9th – Josh Rosenblatt, The Austin Chronicle
- 10th – Dana Stevens, Slate
- 10th – Joe Morgenstern, The Wall Street Journal
- 10th – Joe Neumaier, New York Daily News

=== Accolades ===
Award	Category	Recipient(s)	Result	Ref.
Academy Awards	Best Actor	Mickey Rourke	Nominated	
Academy Awards	Best Supporting Actress	Marisa Tomei	Nominated	
BAFTA Film Awards	Best Leading Actor	Mickey Rourke	Won	
BAFTA Film Awards	Best Supporting Actress	Marisa Tomei	Nominated	
Boston Society of Film Critics	Best Actor	Mickey Rourke	Won	
Broadcast Film Critics Association	Best Song	Bruce Springsteen	Won	
Broadcast Film Critics Association	Best Picture		Nominated	
Broadcast Film Critics Association	Best Actor	Mickey Rourke	Nominated	
Broadcast Film Critics Association	Best Supporting Actress	Marisa Tomei	Nominated	
Chicago Film Critics Association	Best Actor	Mickey Rourke	Won	
Dallas-Fort Worth Film Critics Association	Best Actor	Mickey Rourke	2nd Place	
Dallas-Fort Worth Film Critics Association	Best Supporting Actress	Marisa Tomei	3rd Place	
David di Donatello Awards	Best Foreign Film	Darren Aronofsky	Nominated	
Detroit Film Critics Society	Best Actor	Mickey Rourke	Won	
Detroit Film Critics Society	Best Supporting Actress	Marisa Tomei	Won	
Detroit Film Critics Society	Best Film		Nominated	
Detroit Film Critics Society	Best Director	Darren Aronofsky	Nominated	
ESPY Awards	Best Sports Movie	Darren Aronofsky	Nominated	
Florida Film Critics Circle	Best Actor	Mickey Rourke	Won	
Florida Film Critics Circle	Best Supporting Actress	Marisa Tomei	Won	
Golden Globes	Best Performance by an Actor in a Motion Picture - Drama	Mickey Rourke	Won	
Golden Globes	Best Original Song - Motion Picture	Bruce Springsteen	Won	
Golden Globes	Best Performance by an Actress in a Supporting Role in a Motion Picture	Marisa Tomei	Nominated	
Grammy Awards	Best Song Written for a Motion Picture	Bruce Springsteen	Nominated	
Independent Spirit Awards	Best Feature	Darren Aronofsky; Scott Franklin	Won	
Independent Spirit Awards	Best Male Lead	Mickey Rourke	Won	
Independent Spirit Awards	Best Cinematography	Maryse Alberti	Won	
London Film Critics Circle	Film of the Year		Won	
London Film Critics Circle	Actor of the Year	Mickey Rourke	Won	
London Film Critics Circle	Director of the Year	Darren Aronofsky	Nominated	
Los Angeles Film Critics Association	Best Actor	Mickey Rourke	2nd Place	
MTV Movie Awards	Best Song from a Movie	Bruce Springsteen	Nominated	
National Society of Film Critics	Best Actor	Mickey Rourke	2nd Place	
New York Film Critics Circle	Best Actor	Mickey Rourke	2nd Place	
Online Film Critics Society	Best Actor	Mickey Rourke	Won	
Online Film Critics Society	Best Supporting Actress	Marisa Tomei	Won	
Online Film Critics Society	Best Picture		Nominated	
Online Film Critics Society	Best Director	Darren Aronofsky	Nominated	
Online Film Critics Society	Best Original Screenplay	Robert D. Siegel	Nominated	
San Diego Film Critics Society	Best Actor	Mickey Rourke	Won	
San Diego Film Critics Society	Best Supporting Actress	Marisa Tomei	Won	
San Francisco Film Critics Society	Best Actor	Mickey Rourke	Won	
San Francisco Film Critics Society	Best Supporting Actress	Marisa Tomei	Won	
Satellite Awards	Best Actor in a Motion Picture, Drama	Mickey Rourke	Nominated	
Satellite Awards	Best Original Song	Bruce Springsteen	Nominated	
Screen Actors Guild Awards	Outstanding Performance by a Male Actor in a Leading Role	Mickey Rourke	Nominated	
Toronto Film Critics Association	Best Performance, Male	Mickey Rourke	Won	
Venice Film Festival	Golden Lion	Darren Aronofsky	Won	
Washington D.C. Area Film Critics Association	Best Actor	Mickey Rourke	Won	
Writers Guild of America	Best Original Screenplay	Robert D. Siegel	Nominated	
