= Florida Film Critics Circle Awards 2008 =

Annual US film awards ceremony

13th FFCC Awards

December 18, 2008

Best Film:
Slumdog Millionaire

The 13th Florida Film Critics Circle Awards were given on December 18, 2008.

== Winners ==
- Best Actor:
  - Mickey Rourke - The Wrestler
- Best Actress:
  - Melissa Leo - Frozen River
- Best Animated Film:
  - WALL-E
- Best Cinematography:
  - Wally Pfister - The Dark Knight
- Best Director:
  - Danny Boyle - Slumdog Millionaire
- Best Documentary Film:
  - Man on Wire
- Best Film:
  - Slumdog Millionaire
- Best Foreign Language Film:
  - Let the Right One In (Låt den rätte komma in) • Sweden
- Best Screenplay:
  - Simon Beaufoy - Slumdog Millionaire
- Best Supporting Actor:
  - Heath Ledger - The Dark Knight (posthumous)
- Best Supporting Actress:
  - Marisa Tomei - The Wrestler
- Pauline Kael Breakout Award
  - Martin McDonagh - In Bruges
- Golden Orange for Outstanding Contribution to Film:
  - Dick Morris and the Sarasota Film Society
