= 13th Satellite Awards =

2008 media awards ceremony

- Date: December 14, 2008

Highlights
- Best drama film: Slumdog Millionaire
- Best comedy/musical film: Happy-Go-Lucky
- Best television drama: Dexter
- Best television musical/comedy: Tracey Ullman's State of the Union
- Best director: Danny Boyle for Slumdog Millionaire

The 13th Satellite Awards, honoring the best in film and television of 2008, were given on December 14, 2008.

== Special achievement awards ==
Auteur Award (for his signature scope and style of filmmaking) – Baz Luhrmann

Mary Pickford Award (for outstanding contribution to the entertainment industry) – Louis Gossett Jr.

Nikola Tesla Award (for his innovative make-up, prosthetics, and creature effects in films) – Rick Baker

Outstanding New Talent – Brandon Walters

== Motion picture winners and nominees ==
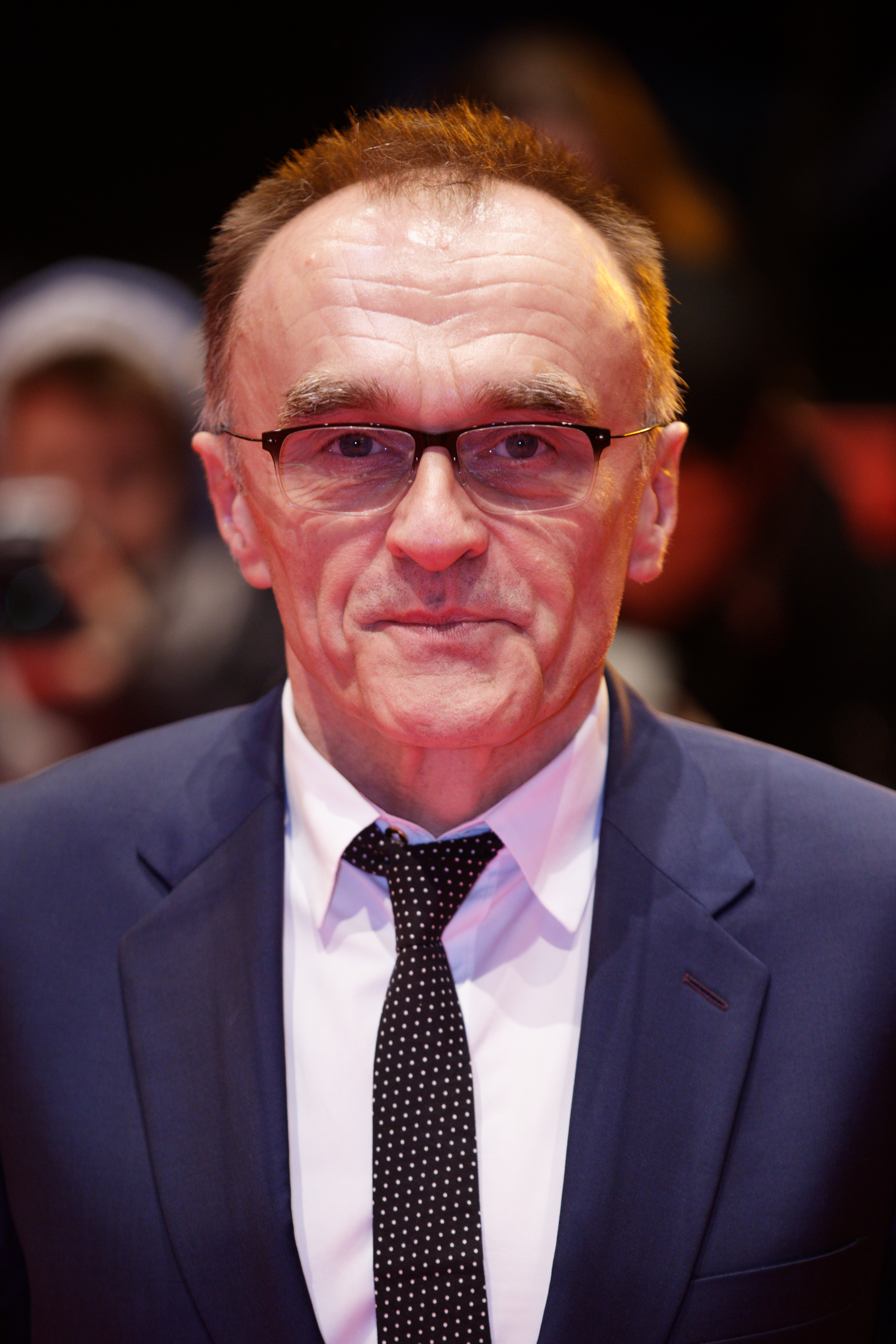
Danny Boyle, Best Director winner

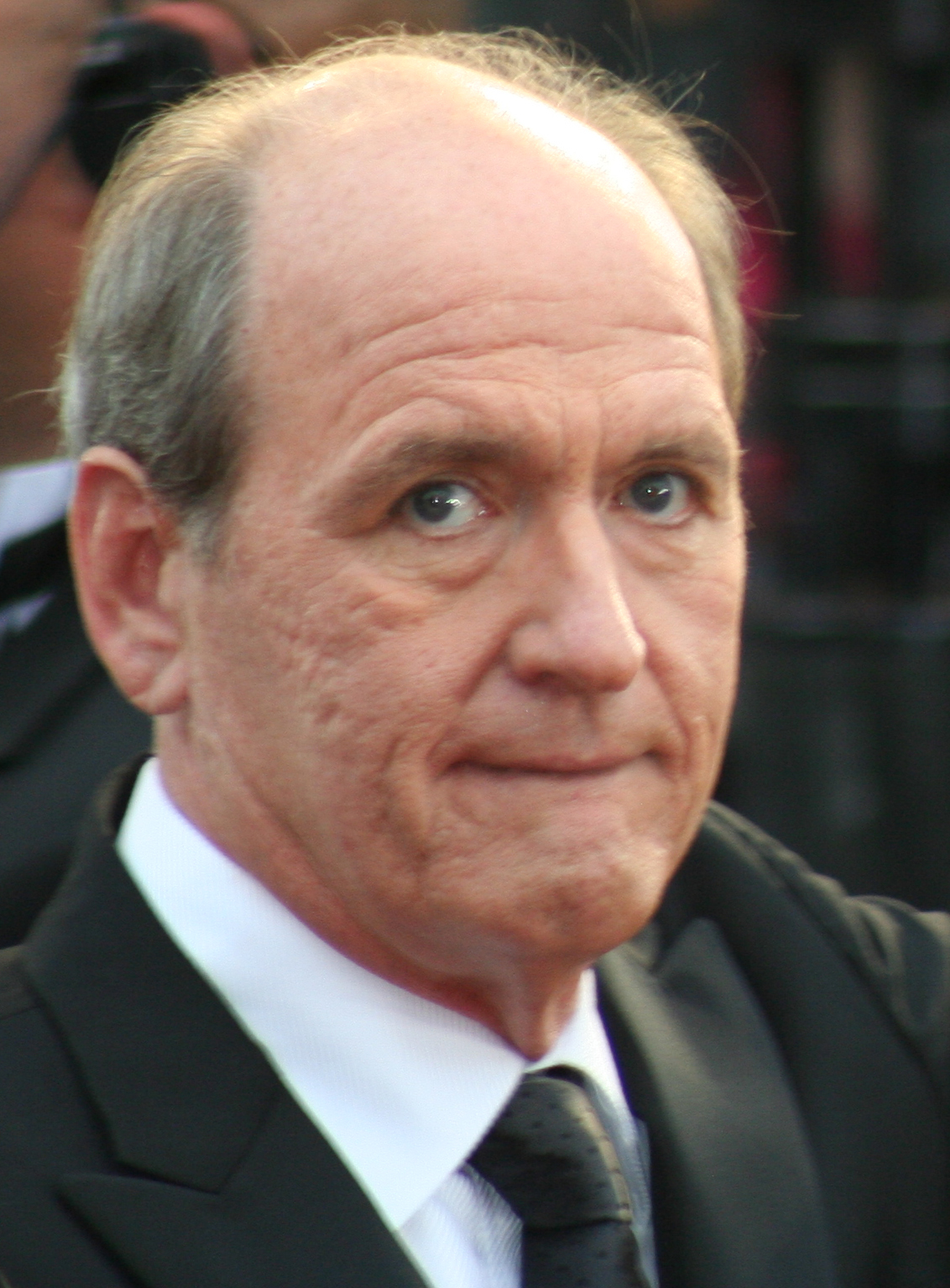
Richard Jenkins, Best Actor in a Motion Picture – Drama winner

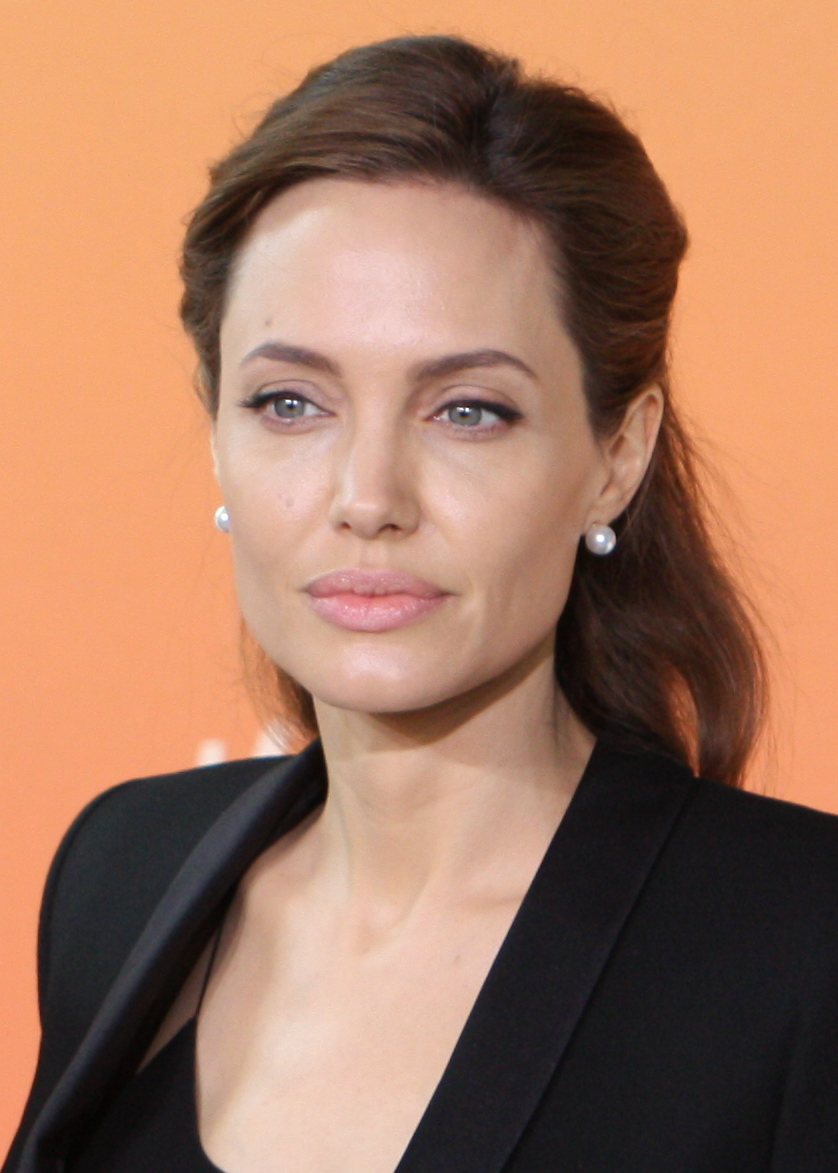
Angelina Jolie, Best Actress in a Motion Picture – Drama winner

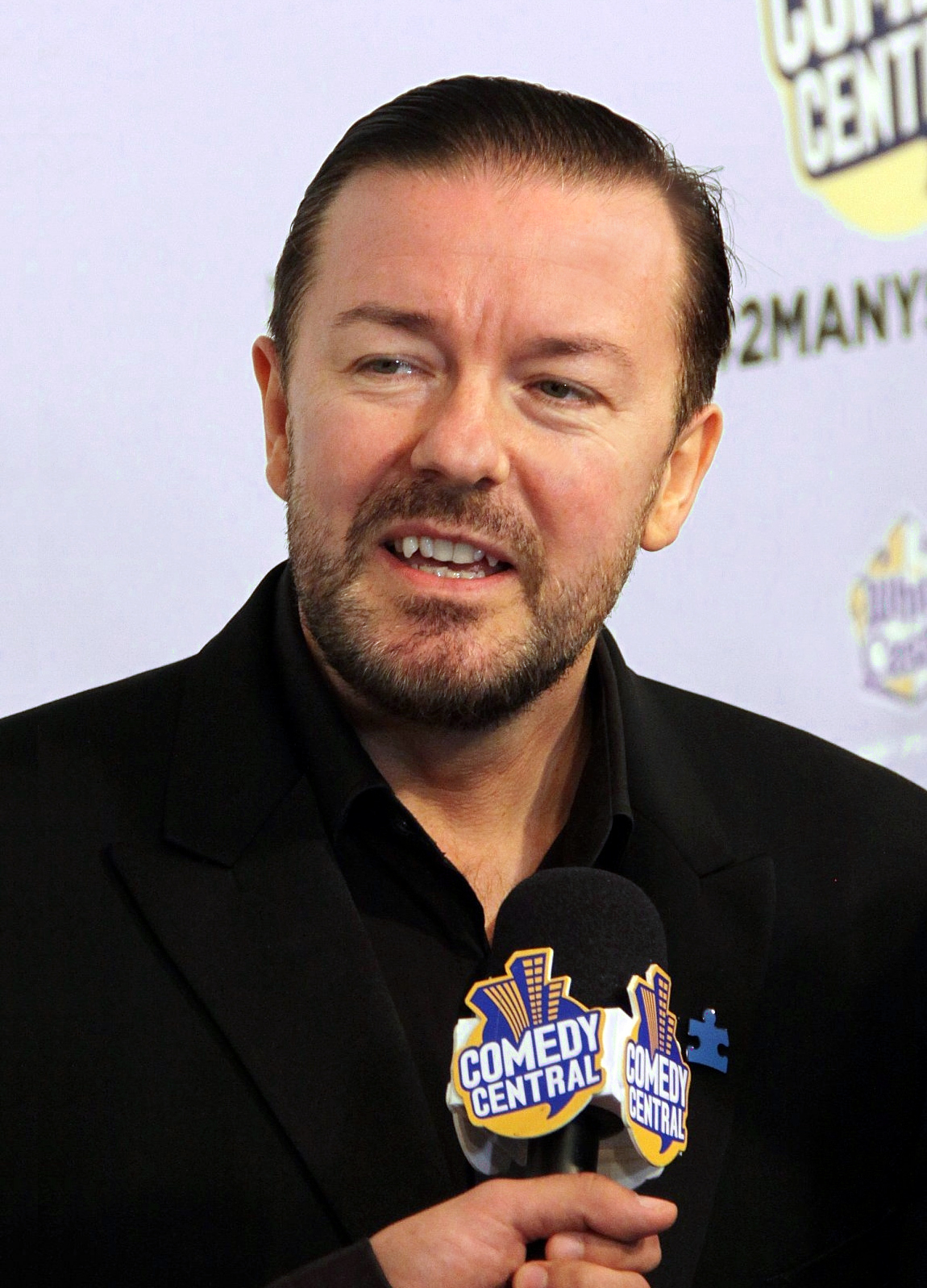
Ricky Gervais, Best Actor in a Motion Picture – Comedy or Musical winner

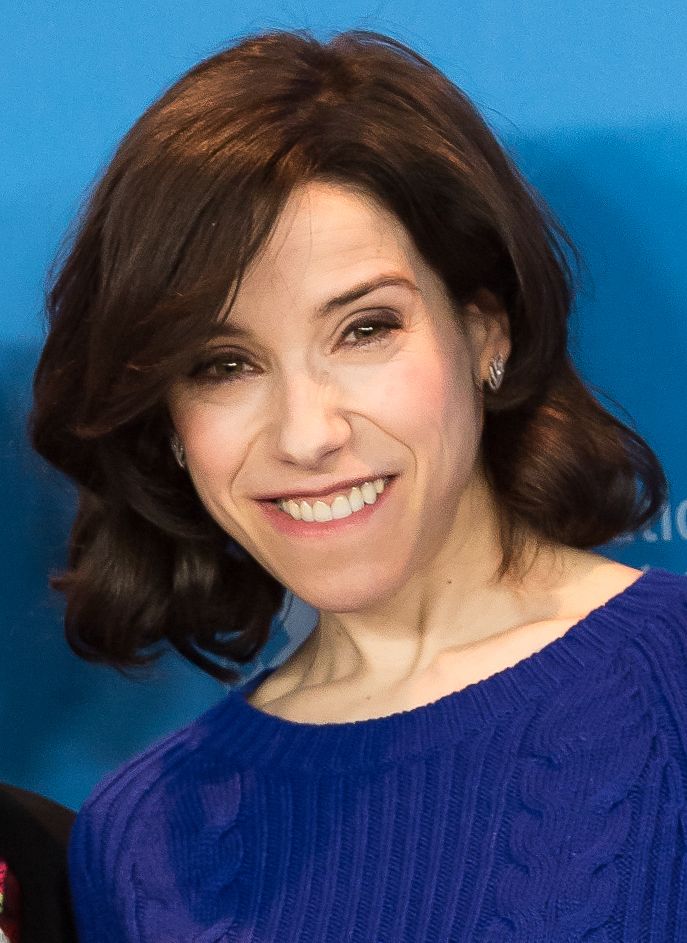
Sally Hawkins, Best Actress in a Motion Picture – Comedy or Musical winner

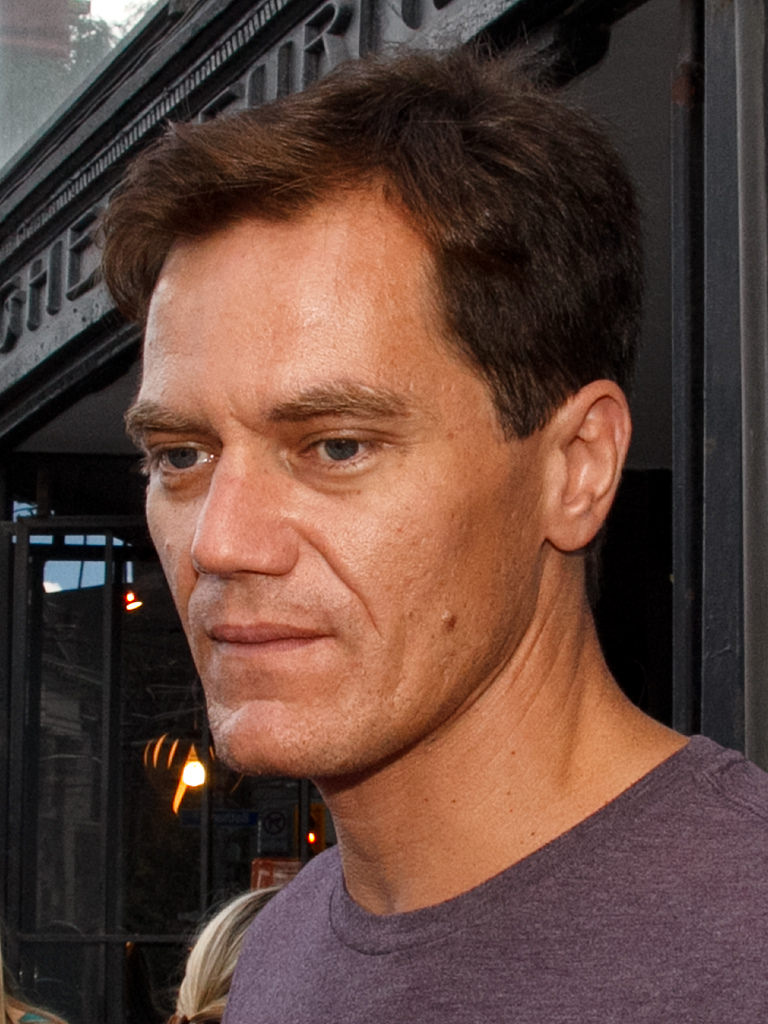
Michael Shannon, Best Supporting Actor in a Motion Picture winner

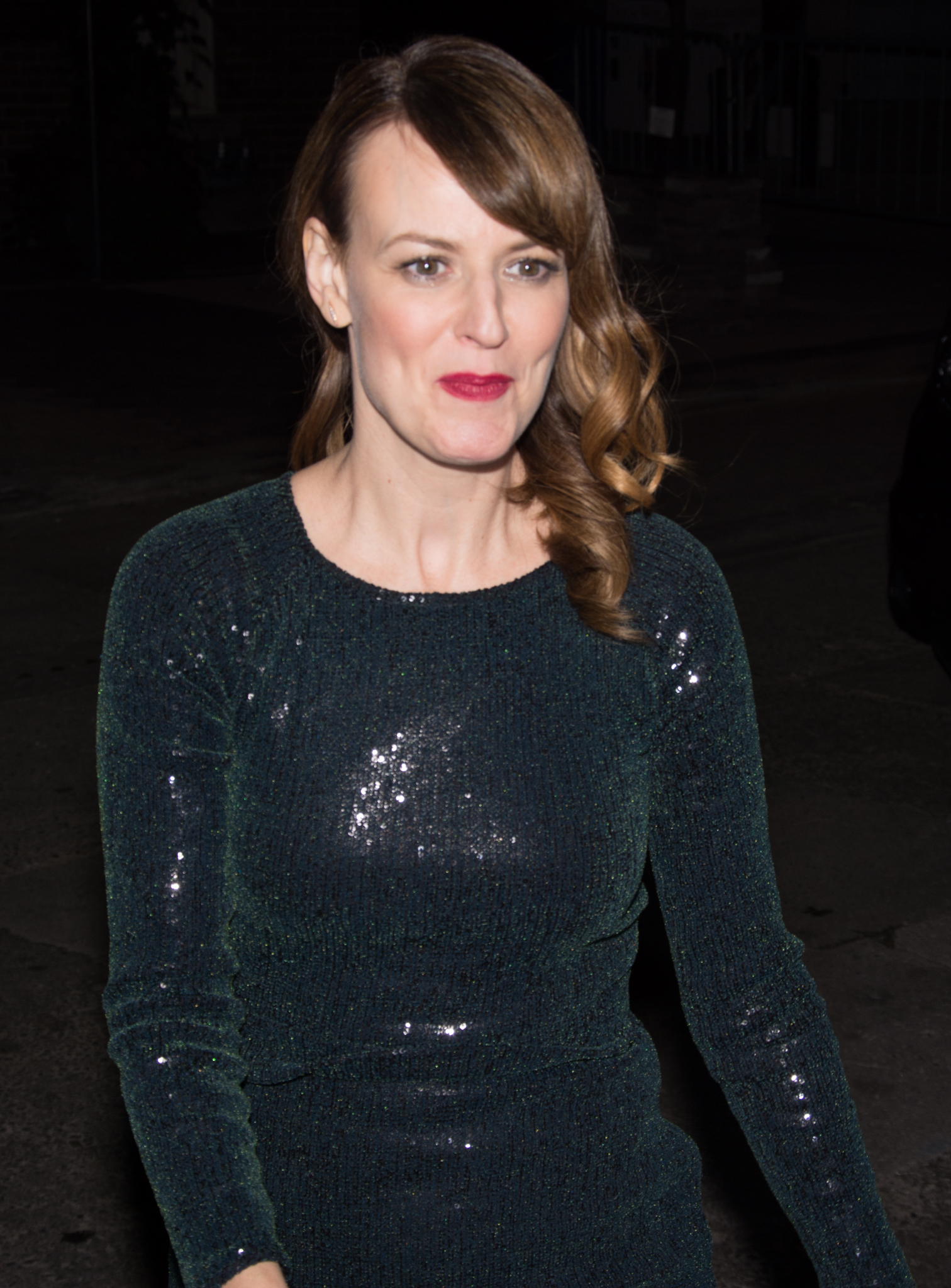
Rosemarie DeWitt, Best Supporting Actress in a Motion Picture winner

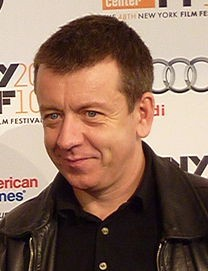
Peter Morgan, Best Adapted Screenplay winner

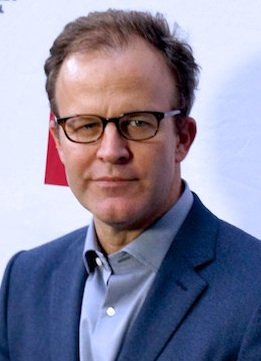
Tom McCarthy, Best Original Screenplay winner

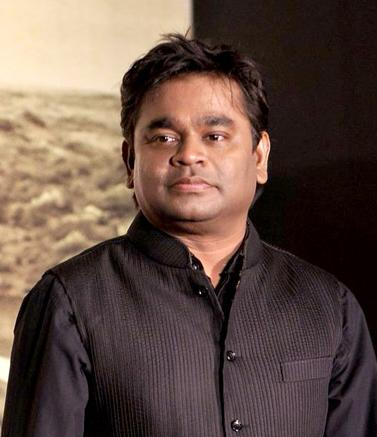
A. R. Rahman, Best Original Score winner

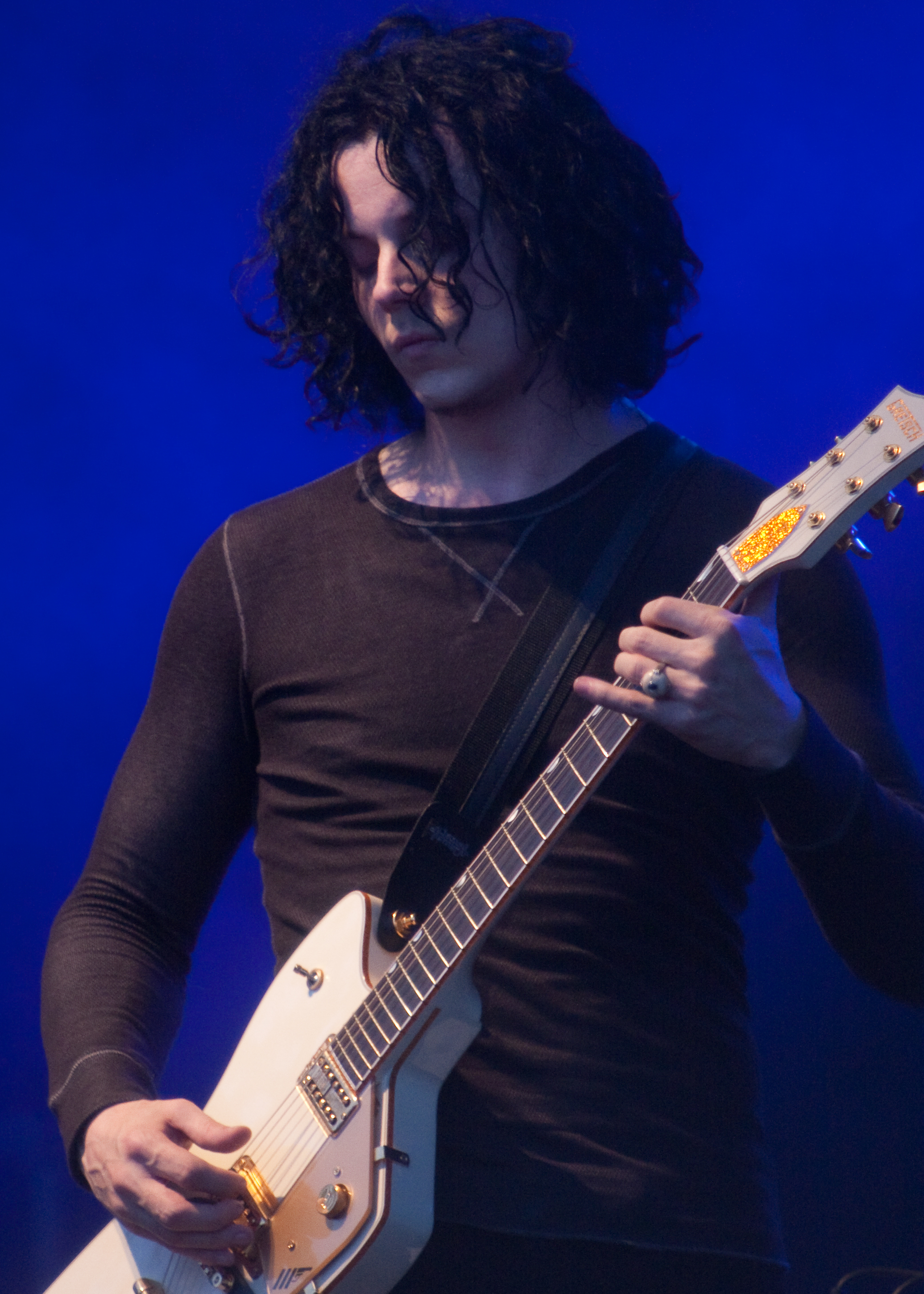
Jack White, Best Original Song winner

=== Best Actor – Drama ===
Richard Jenkins – The Visitor

- Leonardo DiCaprio – Revolutionary Road
- Frank Langella – Frost/Nixon
- Sean Penn – Milk
- Mickey Rourke – The Wrestler
- Mark Ruffalo – What Doesn't Kill You

=== Best Actor – Musical or Comedy ===
Ricky Gervais – Ghost Town

- Josh Brolin – W.
- Michael Cera – Nick & Norah's Infinite Playlist
- Brendan Gleeson – In Bruges
- Sam Rockwell – Choke
- Mark Ruffalo – The Brothers Bloom

=== Best Actress – Drama ===
Angelina Jolie – Changeling

- Anne Hathaway – Rachel Getting Married
- Melissa Leo – Frozen River
- Meryl Streep – Doubt
- Kristin Scott Thomas – I've Loved You So Long (Il y a longtemps que je t'aime)
- Kate Winslet – The Reader

=== Best Actress – Musical or Comedy ===
Sally Hawkins – Happy-Go-Lucky

- Catherine Deneuve – A Christmas Tale (Un conte de Noël)
- Kat Dennings – Nick & Norah's Infinite Playlist
- Lisa Kudrow – Kabluey
- Debra Messing – Nothing like the Holidays
- Meryl Streep – Mamma Mia!

=== Best Animated or Mixed Media Film ===
WALL-E

- Bolt
- Horton Hears a Who!
- The Sky Crawlers
- The Tale of Despereaux
- Waltz with Bashir (Vals im Bashir)

=== Best Art Direction and Production Design ===
Australia

- Brideshead Revisited
- City of Ember
- The Curious Case of Benjamin Button
- The Duchess
- Revolutionary Road

=== Best Cinematography ===
Australia

- Brideshead Revisited
- Changeling
- The Curious Case of Benjamin Button
- The Duchess
- Snow Angels

=== Best Costume Design ===
The Duchess

- Australia
- Brideshead Revisited
- City of Ember
- The Curious Case of Benjamin Button
- Sex and the City

=== Best Director ===
Danny Boyle – Slumdog Millionaire

- Stephen Daldry – The Reader
- Ron Howard – Frost/Nixon
- Tom McCarthy – The Visitor
- Christopher Nolan – The Dark Knight
- Gus Van Sant – Milk

=== Best Documentary Film ===
Anita O'Day: The Life of a Jazz Singer (TIE)
Man on Wire (TIE)

- Encounters at the End of the World
- Pray the Devil Back to Hell
- Religulous
- Waltz with Bashir (Vals im Bashir)

=== Best Editing ===
Iron Man

- Australia
- The Dark Knight
- Frost/Nixon
- Quantum of Solace
- Slumdog Millionaire

=== Best Film – Drama ===
Slumdog Millionaire

- Frost/Nixon
- Frozen River
- Milk
- The Reader
- Revolutionary Road

=== Best Film – Musical or Comedy ===
Happy-Go-Lucky

- Choke
- In Bruges
- Nick & Norah's Infinite Playlist
- Tropic Thunder
- Vicky Cristina Barcelona

=== Best Foreign Language Film ===
Gomorrah (Gomorra) • Italy

- Caramel (Sekkar banat) • France / Lebanon
- The Class (Entre les murs) • France
- Let the Right One In (Låt den rätte komma in) • Sweden
- Padre Nuestro (Sangre de Mi Sangre) • Argentina
- Reprise • Norway

=== Best Original Score ===
Slumdog Millionaire – A. R. Rahman

- Australia – David Hirschfelder
- Horton Hears a Who! – John Powell
- Milk – Danny Elfman
- Quantum of Solace – David Arnold
- WALL-E – Thomas Newman

=== Best Original Song ===
"Another Way to Die" – Quantum of Solace

- "By the Boab Tree" – Australia
- "Down to Earth" – WALL-E
- "If the World" – Body of Lies
- "Jai Ho" – Slumdog Millionaire
- "The Wrestler" – The Wrestler

=== Best Screenplay – Adapted ===
Frost/Nixon – Peter Morgan

- The Curious Case of Benjamin Button – Eric Roth and Robin Swicord
- Doubt – John Patrick Shanley
- Elegy – Philip Roth
- The Reader – David Hare
- Revolutionary Road – Justin Haythe
- Slumdog Millionaire – Simon Beaufoy

=== Best Screenplay – Original ===
The Visitor – Tom McCarthy

- Australia – Baz Luhrmann
- Frozen River – Courtney Hunt
- Milk – Dustin Lance Black
- Seven Pounds – Grant Nieporte

=== Best Sound ===
The Dark Knight

- Australia
- The Day the Earth Stood Still
- Iron Man
- Quantum of Solace
- WALL-E

=== Best Supporting Actor ===
Michael Shannon – Revolutionary Road

- Robert Downey Jr. – Tropic Thunder
- James Franco – Milk
- Philip Seymour Hoffman – Doubt
- Heath Ledger – The Dark Knight (posthumous)
- Rade Šerbedžija – Fugitive Pieces

=== Best Supporting Actress ===
Rosemarie DeWitt – Rachel Getting Married

- Beyoncé – Cadillac Records
- Penélope Cruz – Elegy
- Anjelica Huston – Choke
- Sophie Okonedo – The Secret Life of Bees
- Emma Thompson – Brideshead Revisited

=== Best Visual Effects ===
Australia

- The Dark Knight
- The Day the Earth Stood Still
- Iron Man
- Quantum of Solace

== Television winners and nominees ==
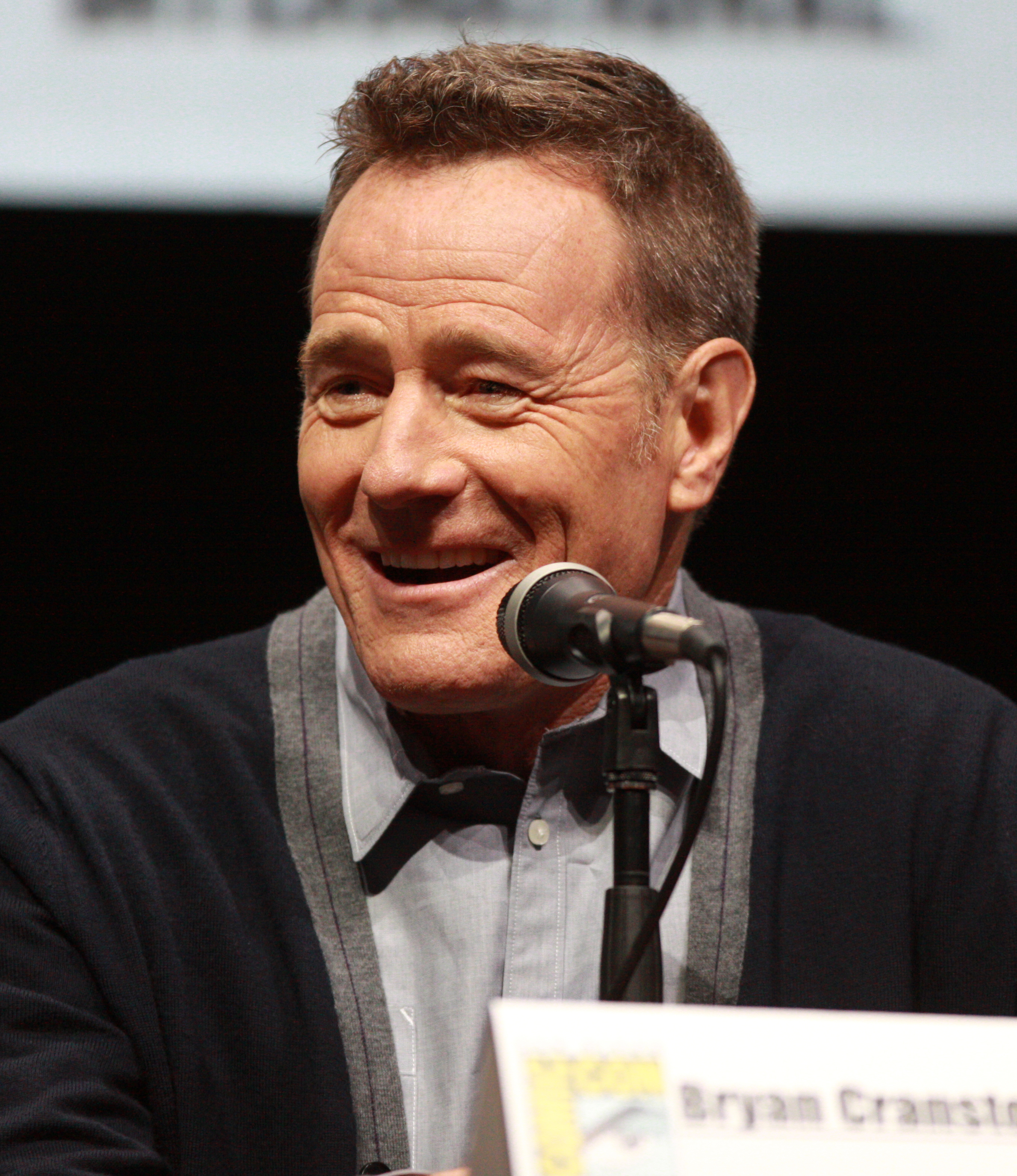
Bryan Cranston, Best Actor in a Drama Series winner

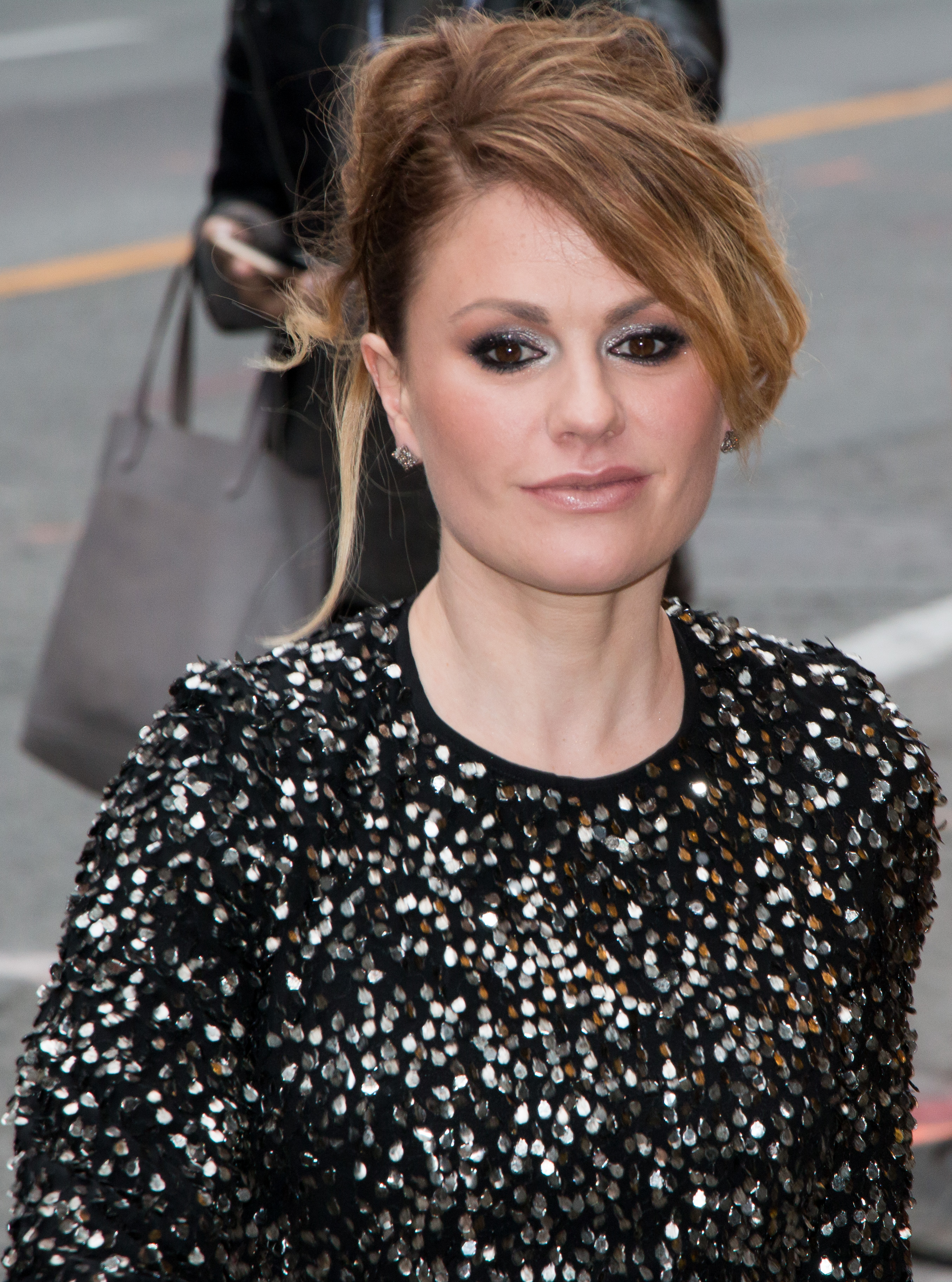
Anna Paquin, Best Actress in a Drama Series winner

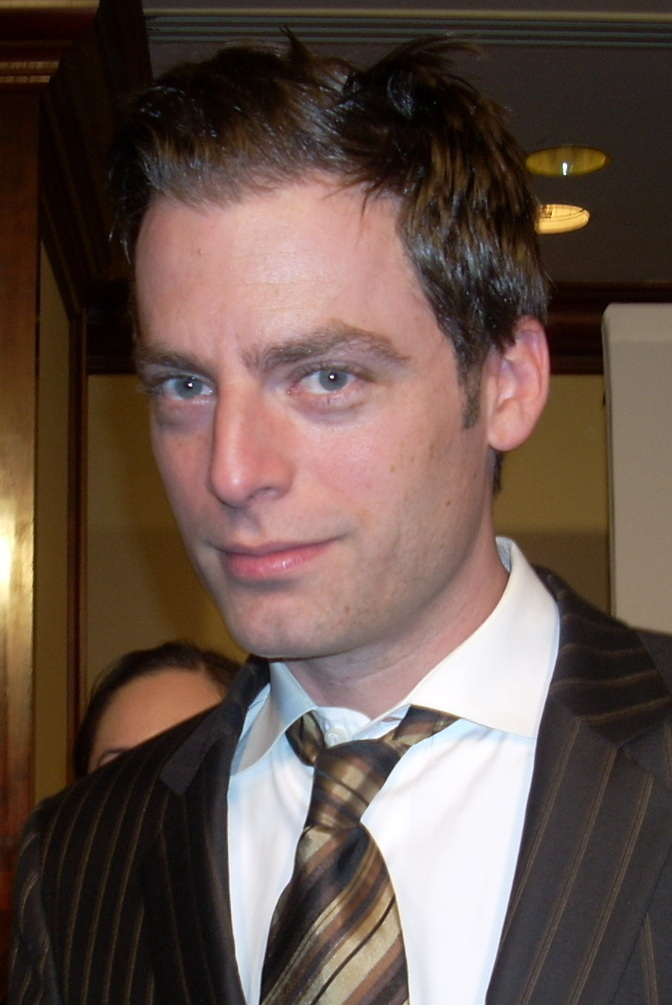
Justin Kirk, Best Actor in a Comedy or Musical Series winner

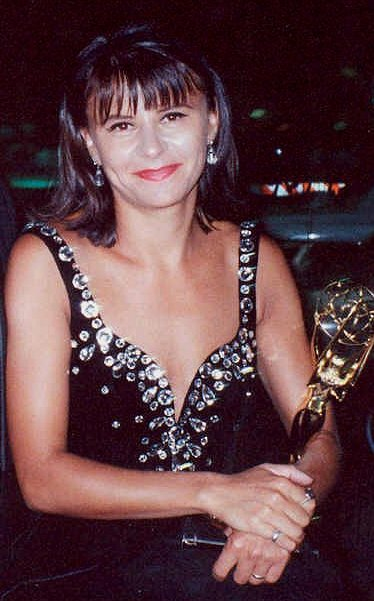
Tracey Ullman, Best Actress in a Comedy or Musical Series winner

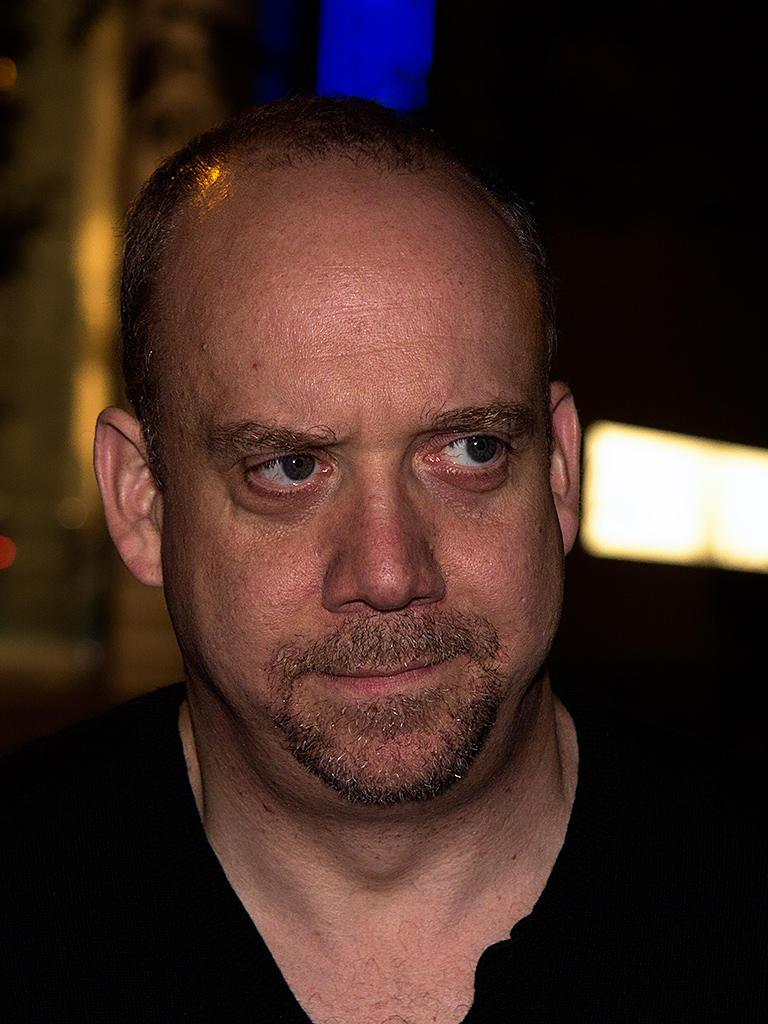
Paul Giamatti, Best Actor in a Miniseries or Television Film winner

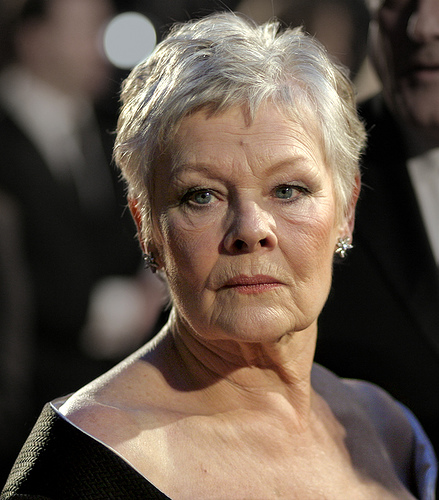
Judi Dench, Best Actress in a Miniseries or Television Film winner

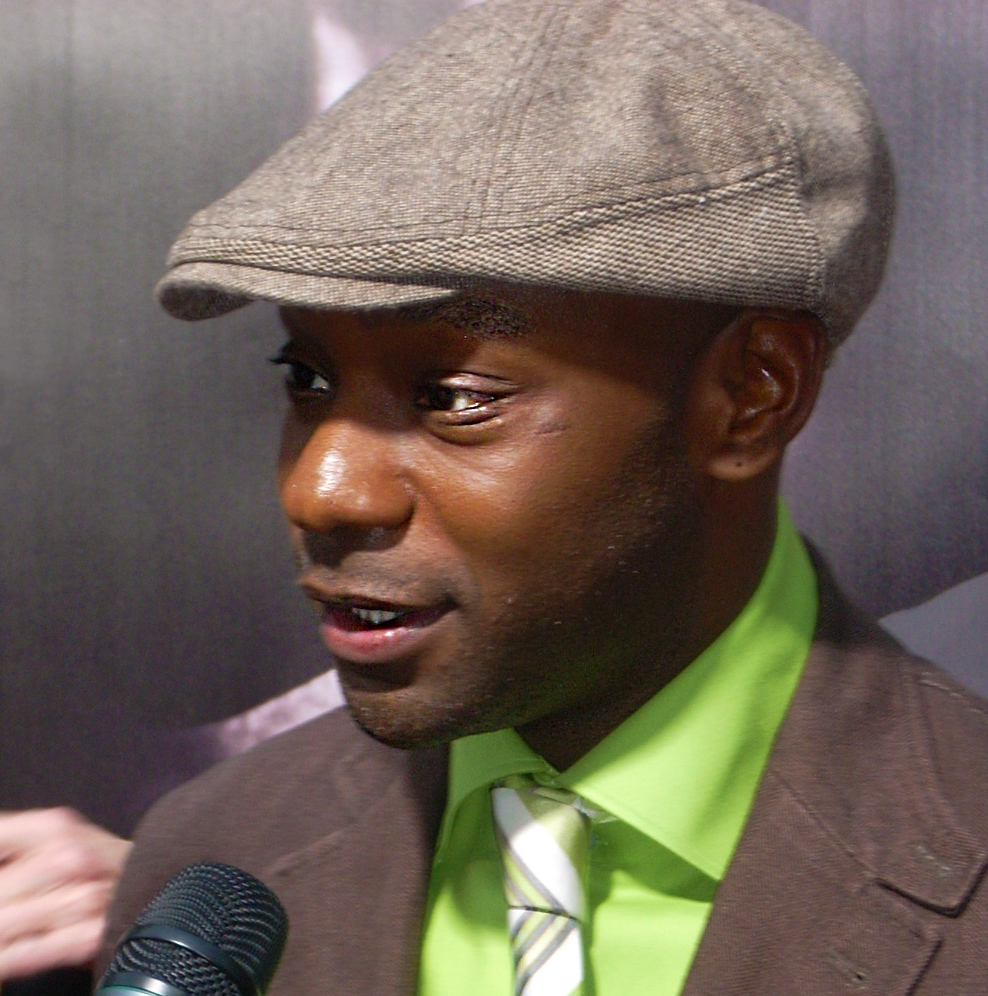
Nelsan Ellis, Best Supporting Actor in a Series, Miniseries, or Television Film winner

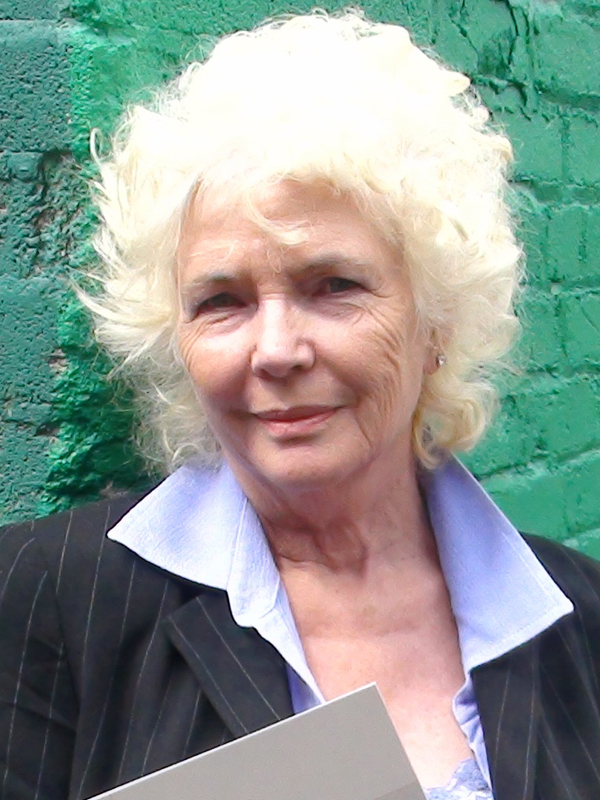
Fionnula Flanagan, Best Supporting Actress in a Series, Miniseries, or Television Film winner

=== Best Actor – Drama Series ===
Bryan Cranston – Breaking Bad

- Gabriel Byrne – In Treatment
- Michael C. Hall – Dexter
- Jon Hamm – Mad Men
- Jason Isaacs – Brotherhood
- David Tennant – Doctor Who

=== Best Actor – Musical or Comedy Series ===
Justin Kirk – Weeds

- Alec Baldwin – 30 Rock
- Danny DeVito – It's Always Sunny in Philadelphia
- David Duchovny – Californication
- Jonny Lee Miller – Eli Stone
- Lee Pace – Pushing Daisies

=== Best Actor – Miniseries or TV Film ===
Paul Giamatti – John Adams

- Benedict Cumberbatch – The Last Enemy
- Ralph Fiennes – Bernard and Doris
- Stellan Skarsgård – God on Trial
- Kevin Spacey – Recount
- Tom Wilkinson – Recount

=== Best Actress – Drama Series ===
Anna Paquin – True Blood

- Glenn Close – Damages
- Kathryn Erbe – Law & Order: Criminal Intent
- Sally Field – Brothers and Sisters
- Holly Hunter – Saving Grace
- Kyra Sedgwick – The Closer

=== Best Actress – Musical or Comedy Series ===
Tracey Ullman – Tracey Ullman's State of the Union

- Christina Applegate – Samantha Who?
- America Ferrera – Ugly Betty
- Tina Fey – 30 Rock
- Julia Louis-Dreyfus – The New Adventures of Old Christine
- Mary-Louise Parker – Weeds

=== Best Actress – Miniseries or TV Film ===
Judi Dench – Cranford

- Jacqueline Bisset – An Old Fashioned Thanksgiving
- Laura Linney – John Adams
- Phylicia Rashad – A Raisin in the Sun
- Susan Sarandon – Bernard and Doris
- Julie Walters – Filth: The Mary Whitehouse Story

=== Best Miniseries ===
Cranford

- John Adams
- The Last Enemy

=== Best Series – Drama ===
Dexter

- Brotherhood
- In Treatment
- Life on Mars
- Mad Men
- Primeval

=== Best Series – Musical or Comedy ===
Tracey Ullman's State of the Union

- 30 Rock
- The Colbert Report
- It's Always Sunny in Philadelphia
- Pushing Daisies
- Skins

=== Best Supporting Actor – Miniseries or TV Film ===
Nelsan Ellis – True Blood

- Željko Ivanek – Damages
- Harvey Keitel – Life on Mars
- John Noble – Fringe
- John Slattery – Mad Men
- Jimmy Smits – Dexter

=== Best Supporting Actress – Miniseries or TV Film ===
Fionnula Flanagan – Brotherhood

- Kristin Chenoweth – Pushing Daisies
- Laura Dern – Recount
- Sarah Polley – John Adams
- Dianne Wiest – In Treatment
- Chandra Wilson – Grey's Anatomy

=== Best TV Film ===
Filth: The Mary Whitehouse Story

- 24: Redemption
- Bernard and Doris
- God on Trial
- The Memory Keeper's Daughter
- Recount

== New Media winners and nominees ==
=== Best Classic DVD ===
The Godfather, The Godfather Part II, and The Godfather Part III (The Godfather Collection – The Coppola Restoration)

- Beetlejuice (20th Anniversary Deluxe Edition)
- Diva
- Dracula (75th Anniversary Edition)
- High Noon (Two-Disc Ultimate Collector's Edition)
- The Mummy
- Psycho
- Road House
- Touch of Evil (50th Anniversary Edition)
- Young Frankenstein

=== Best DVD Extras ===
Iron Man (Two-Disc Collector's Edition)

- 4 Months, 3 Weeks and 2 Days
- Across the Universe
- The Assassination of Jesse James by the Coward Robert Ford
- The Bank Job
- Eight Men Out
- Gone Baby Gone
- High Noon (Two-Disc Ultimate Collector's Edition)
- Into the Wild
- WALL-E (Three-Disc Special Edition)

=== Best DVD Release of a TV Show ===
- 30 Rock (Season 2)
- The Tudors (The Complete First Season)

=== Outstanding Action/Adventure Game ===
Metal Gear Solid 4: Guns of the Patriots

- Dead Space
- LittleBigPlanet
- Super Mario Galaxy
- Super Smash Bros. Brawl

=== Outstanding Music/Rhythm Game ===
Rock Band 2

- Guitar Hero World Tour
- Patapon
- Rock Band
- SingStar

=== Outstanding Overall Blu-Ray ===
Sleeping Beauty (Two-Disc 50th Anniversary Platinum Edition Blu-Ray and DVD)

- The Dark Knight
- The Godfather, The Godfather Part II, and The Godfather Part III (The Godfather Collection – The Coppola Restoration)
- Iron Man
- WALL-E (Three-Disc Special Edition Blu-Ray and DVD)

=== Outstanding Overall DVD ===
No Country for Old Men

- 3:10 to Yuma
- Atonement
- The Diving Bell and the Butterfly
- Juno
- Lars and the Real Girl
- Lust, Caution
- Michael Clayton
- Sweeney Todd: The Demon Barber of Fleet Street (Two-Disc Collection)
- The Visitor

=== Outstanding Puzzle/Strategy Game ===
World of Goo

- Advance Wars: Days of Ruin
- Professor Layton and the Curious Village
- Sid Meyer's Civilization Revolution
- Spore

=== Outstanding Sports/Racing Game ===
NHL 09

- Burnout Paradise
- FIFA 09
- Mario Kart Wii
- MLB 08: The Show
- Wii Fit

=== Outstanding Youth DVD ===
WarGames (25th Anniversary Edition)

- Avatar: The Last Airbender (Book 3 Fire, Vol. 4)
- Cars
- Enchanted
- Nim's Island
- One Hundred and One Dalmatians (Two-Disc Platinum Edition DVD)
- Sleeping Beauty (Two-Disc 50th Anniversary Platinum Edition Blu-Ray and DVD)
- The Spiderwick Chronicles
- WALL-E (Three-Disc Special Edition)
- The Water Horse (Two-Disc Edition)
- Watership Down (Deluxe Edition)

== Awards breakdown ==
=== Film ===
Winners:

3 / 6 Slumdog Millionaire: Best Director / Best Film – Drama / Best Original Score
3 / 9 Australia: Best Art Direction and Production Design / Best Cinematography / Best Visual Effects
2 / 2 Happy-Go-Lucky: Best Actress – Musical or Comedy / Best Film – Musical or Comedy
2 / 3 The Visitor: Best Actor – Drama / Best Screenplay – Original
1 / 1 Anita O'Day: The Life of a Jazz Singer: Best Documentary Film
1 / 1 Ghost Town: Best Actor – Musical or Comedy
1 / 1 Gomorrah (Gomorra): Best Foreign Language Film
1 / 1 Man on Wire: Best Documentary Film
1 / 2 Changeling: Best Actress – Drama
1 / 2 Rachel Getting Married: Best Supporting Actress
1 / 3 The Duchess: Best Costume Design
1 / 3 Iron Man: Best Editing
1 / 4 WALL-E: Best Animated or Mixed Media Film
1 / 5 The Dark Knight: Best Sound
1 / 5 Frost/Nixon: Best Screenplay – Adapted
1 / 5 Quantum of Solace: Best Original Song
1 / 5 Revolutionary Road: Best Supporting Actor

Losers:

0 / 6 Milk
0 / 4 Brideshead Revisited, The Curious Case of Benjamin Button, The Reader
0 / 3 Choke, Nick & Norah's Infinite Playlist
0 / 2 City of Ember, The Day the Earth Stood Still, Doubt, Elegy, Horton Hears a Who!, In Bruges, Frozen River, Waltz with Bashir (Vals im Bashir), The Wrestler

=== Television ===
Winners:

2 / 2 Cranford: Best Actress – Miniseries or TV Film / Best Miniseries
2 / 2 Tracey Ullman's State of the Union: Best Actress – Musical or Comedy Series / Best Series – Musical or Comedy
2 / 2 True Blood: Best Actress – Drama Series / Best Supporting Actor – Miniseries or TV Film
1 / 1 Breaking Bad: Best Actor – Drama Series
1 / 2 Filth: The Mary Whitehouse Story: Best TV Film
1 / 2 Weeds: Best Actor – Musical or Comedy Series
1 / 3 Brotherhood: Best Supporting Actress – Miniseries or TV Film
1 / 3 Dexter: Best Series – Drama
1 / 4 John Adams: Best Actor – Miniseries or TV Film

Losers:

0 / 4 Recount
0 / 3 30 Rock, Bernard and Doris, In Treatment, Mad Men, Pushing Daisies
0 / 2 Damages, God on Trial, It's Always Sunny in Philadelphia, The Last Enemy, Life on Mars
