= Chicago Film Critics Association Awards 2008 =

Annual US film awards ceremony

20th CFCA Awards

December 18, 2008

Best Film:
WALL-E

The 21st Chicago Film Critics Association Awards, given by the CFCA on December 18, 2008, honored the best in film for 2008. Disney/Pixar's WALL-E was the most successful film in the ceremony, winning four awards, including Best Film, out of five nominations. Slumdog Millionaire won three awards, and Let the Right One In won two awards.

== Winners and nominees ==
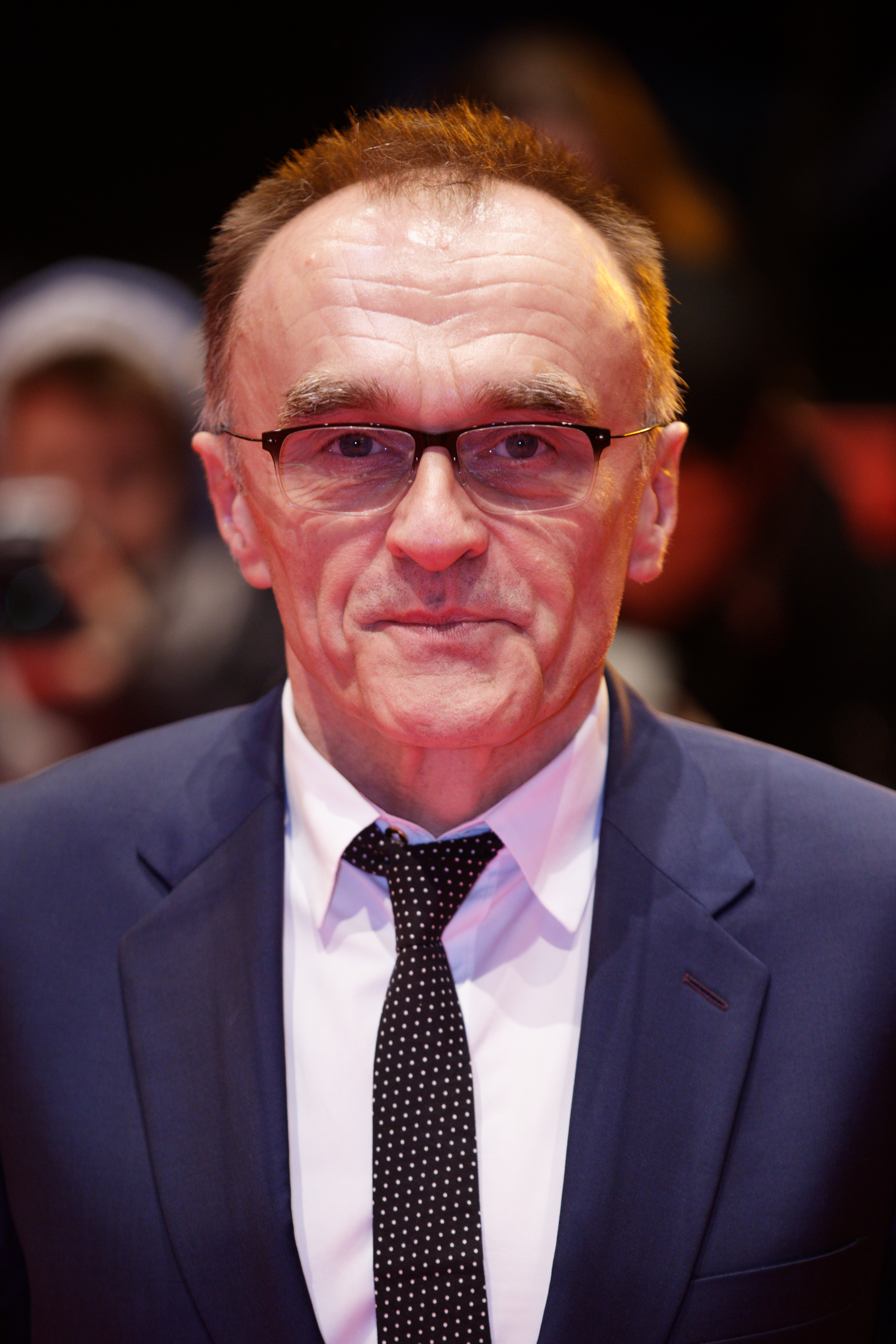
Danny Boyle, Best Director winner

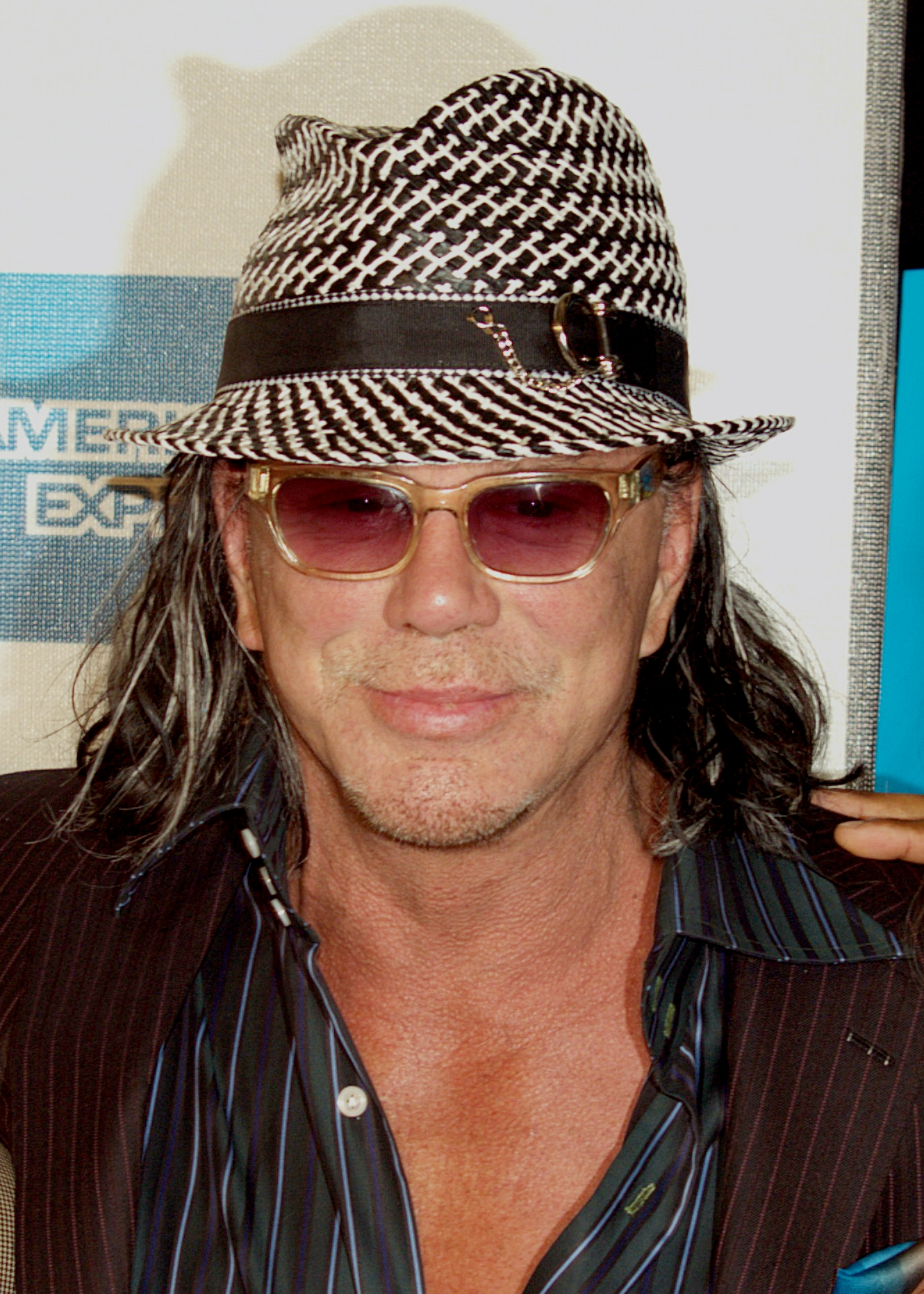
Mickey Rourke, Best Actor winner

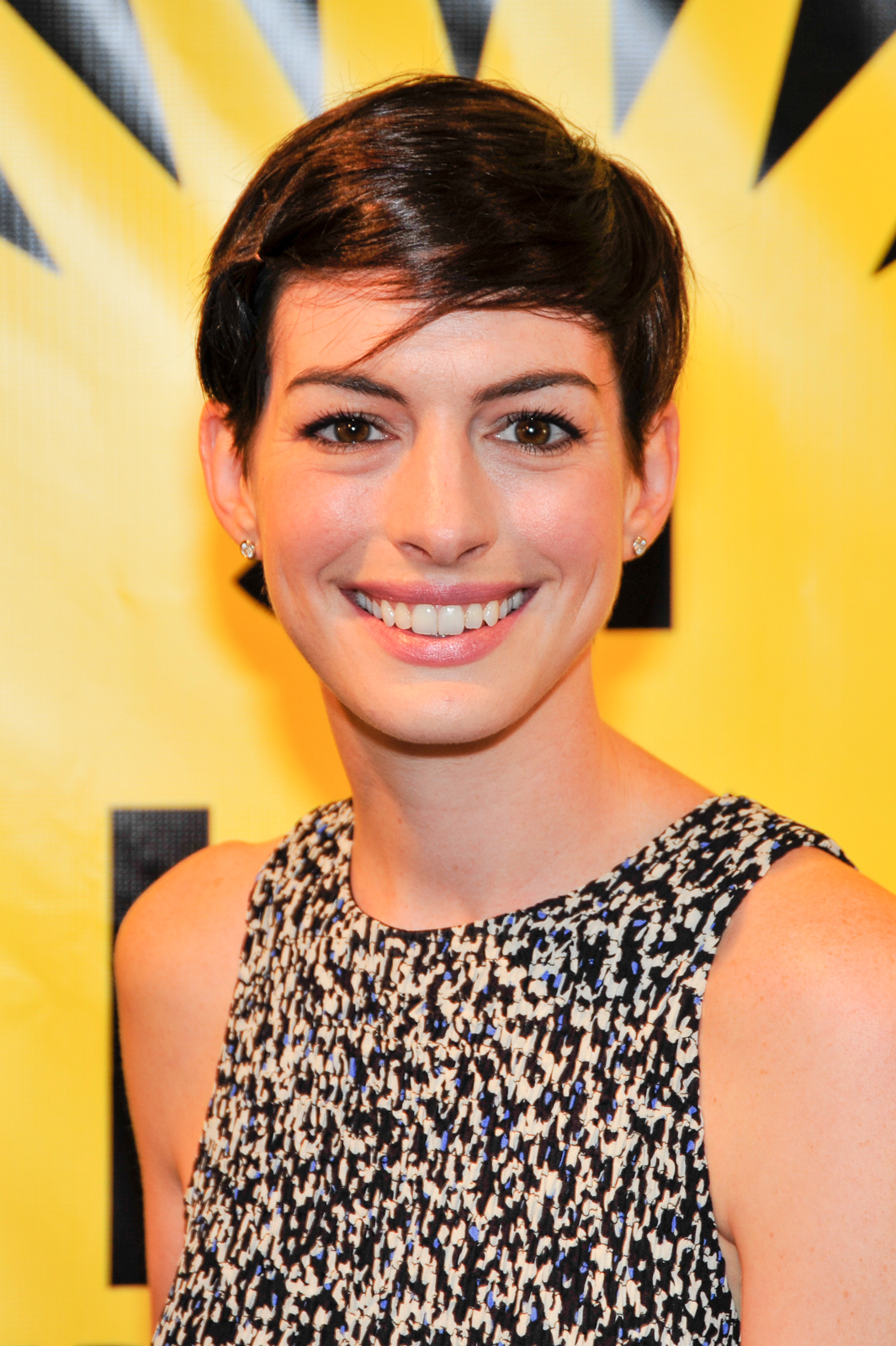
Anne Hathaway, Best Actress winner

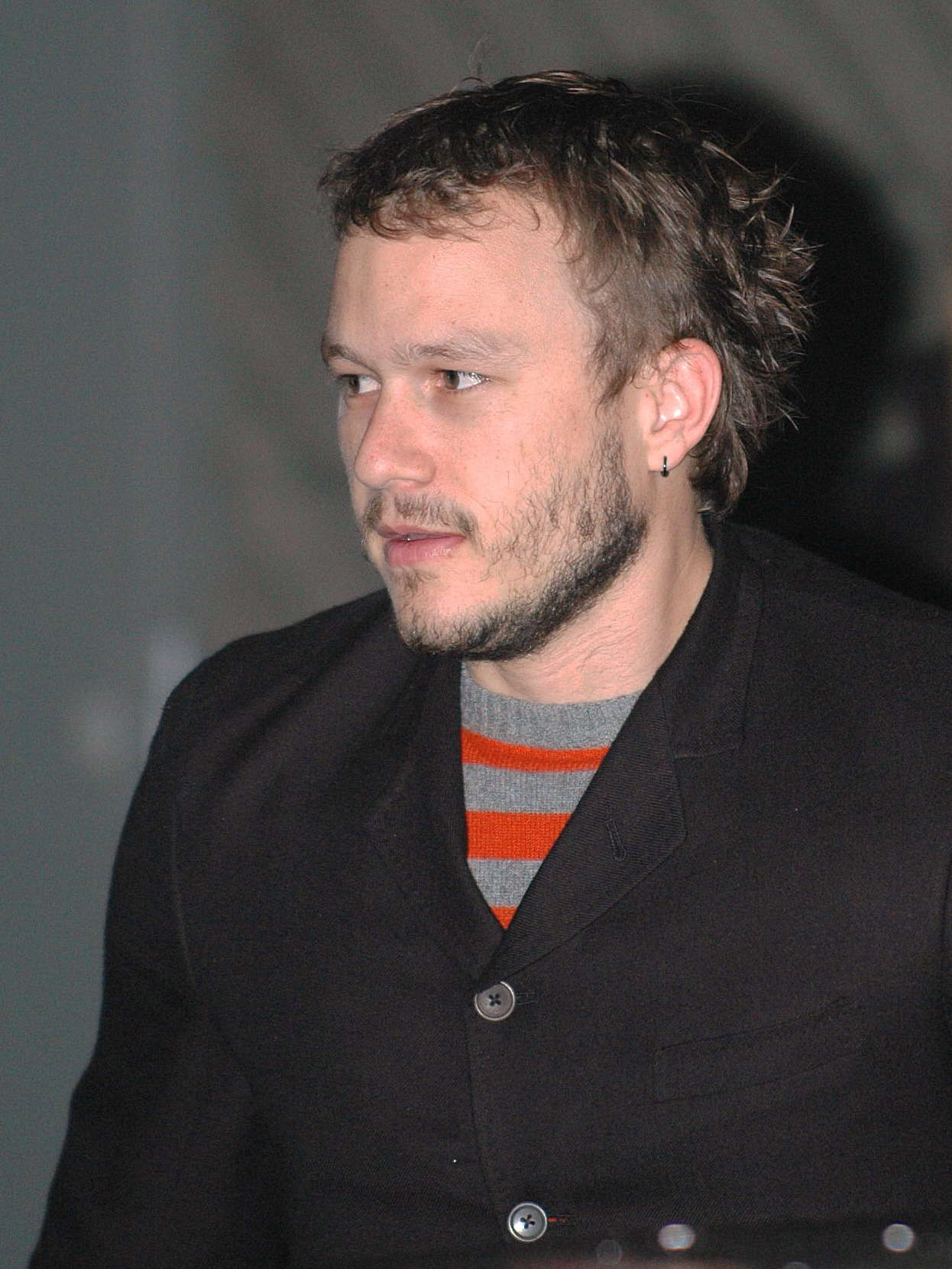
Heath Ledger, Best Supporting Actor winner

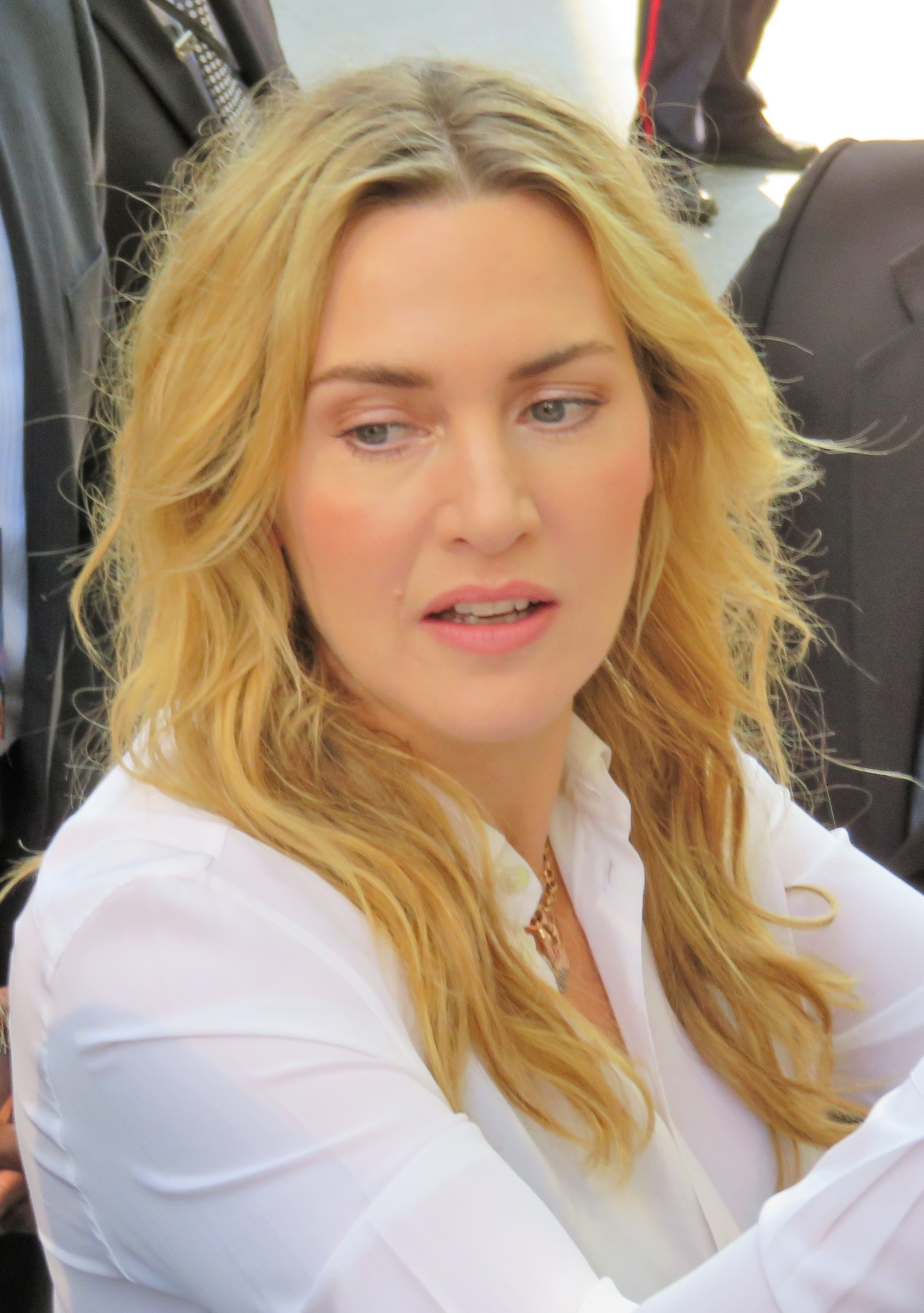
Kate Winslet, Best Supporting Actress winner

=== Best Actor ===
Mickey Rourke – The Wrestler

- Clint Eastwood – Gran Torino
- Richard Jenkins – The Visitor
- Frank Langella – Frost/Nixon
- Sean Penn – Milk

=== Best Actress ===
Anne Hathaway – Rachel Getting Married

- Sally Hawkins – Happy-Go-Lucky
- Angelina Jolie – Changeling
- Melissa Leo – Frozen River
- Meryl Streep – Doubt

=== Best Animated Film ===
WALL-E

- Bolt
- Kung Fu Panda
- The Tale of Despereaux
- Waltz with Bashir

=== Best Cinematography ===
Slumdog Millionaire – Anthony Dod Mantle

- Australia – Mandy Walker
- The Curious Case of Benjamin Button – Claudio Miranda
- The Dark Knight – Wally Pfister
- The Fall – Colin Watkinson

=== Best Director ===
Danny Boyle – Slumdog Millionaire

- David Fincher – The Curious Case of Benjamin Button
- Christopher Nolan – The Dark Knight
- Andrew Stanton – WALL-E
- Gus Van Sant – Milk

=== Best Documentary Film ===
Man on Wire

- American Teen
- Dear Zachary: A Letter to a Son About His Father
- I.O.U.S.A.
- Standard Operating Procedure

=== Best Film ===
WALL-E

- The Curious Case of Benjamin Button
- The Dark Knight
- Milk
- Slumdog Millionaire

=== Best Foreign Language Film ===
Let the Right One In (Låt den rätte komma in), Sweden

- The Band's Visit (Bikur Ha-Tizmoret), Israel
- Che, France, Spain, & USA
- A Christmas Tale (Un conte de Noël), France
- I've Loved You So Long (Il y a longtemps que je t'aime), France

=== Best Original Score ===
WALL-E – Thomas Newman

- The Curious Case of Benjamin Button – Alexandre Desplat
- The Dark Knight – Hans Zimmer and James Newton Howard
- Milk – Danny Elfman
- Slumdog Millionaire – A. R. Rahman

=== Best Screenplay – Adapted ===
Slumdog Millionaire – Simon Beaufoy

- The Curious Case of Benjamin Button – Eric Roth
- The Dark Knight – Jonathan Nolan and Christopher Nolan
- Doubt – John Patrick Shanley
- Frost/Nixon – Peter Morgan

=== Best Screenplay – Original ===
WALL-E – Andrew Stanton and Jim Reardon

- In Bruges – Martin McDonagh
- Milk – Dustin Lance Black
- Rachel Getting Married – Jenny Lumet
- Synecdoche, New York – Charlie Kaufman

=== Best Supporting Actor ===
Heath Ledger – The Dark Knight (posthumously)

- Robert Downey Jr. – Tropic Thunder
- Philip Seymour Hoffman – Doubt
- Bill Irwin – Rachel Getting Married
- Michael Shannon – Revolutionary Road

=== Best Supporting Actress ===
Kate Winslet – The Reader

- Amy Adams – Doubt
- Penélope Cruz – Vicky Cristina Barcelona
- Viola Davis – Doubt
- Rosemarie DeWitt – Rachel Getting Married

=== Most Promising Filmmaker ===
Tomas Alfredson – Let the Right One In (Låt den rätte komma in)

- Lance Hammer – Ballast
- Courtney Hunt – Frozen River
- Martin McDonagh – In Bruges
- Steve McQueen – Hunger

=== Most Promising Performer ===
Dev Patel – Slumdog Millionaire

- Russell Brand – Forgetting Sarah Marshall
- David Kross – The Reader
- Lina Leandersson – Let the Right One In (Låt den rätte komma in)
- Brandon Walters – Australia
