= 24th Independent Spirit Awards =

US film awards ceremony in 2009

- Date: February 21, 2009
- Site: U.S.
- Hosted by: Steve Coogan

Highlights
- Best Film: The Wrestler
- Most awards: The Wrestler (3)
- Most nominations: Ballast (6); Rachel Getting Married (6)

The 24th Independent Spirit Awards, honoring the best in independent filmmaking for 2008, were announced on February 21, 2009. It was hosted by Steve Coogan.

== Winners and nominees ==
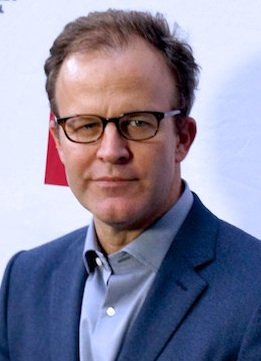
Tom McCarthy, Best Director winner

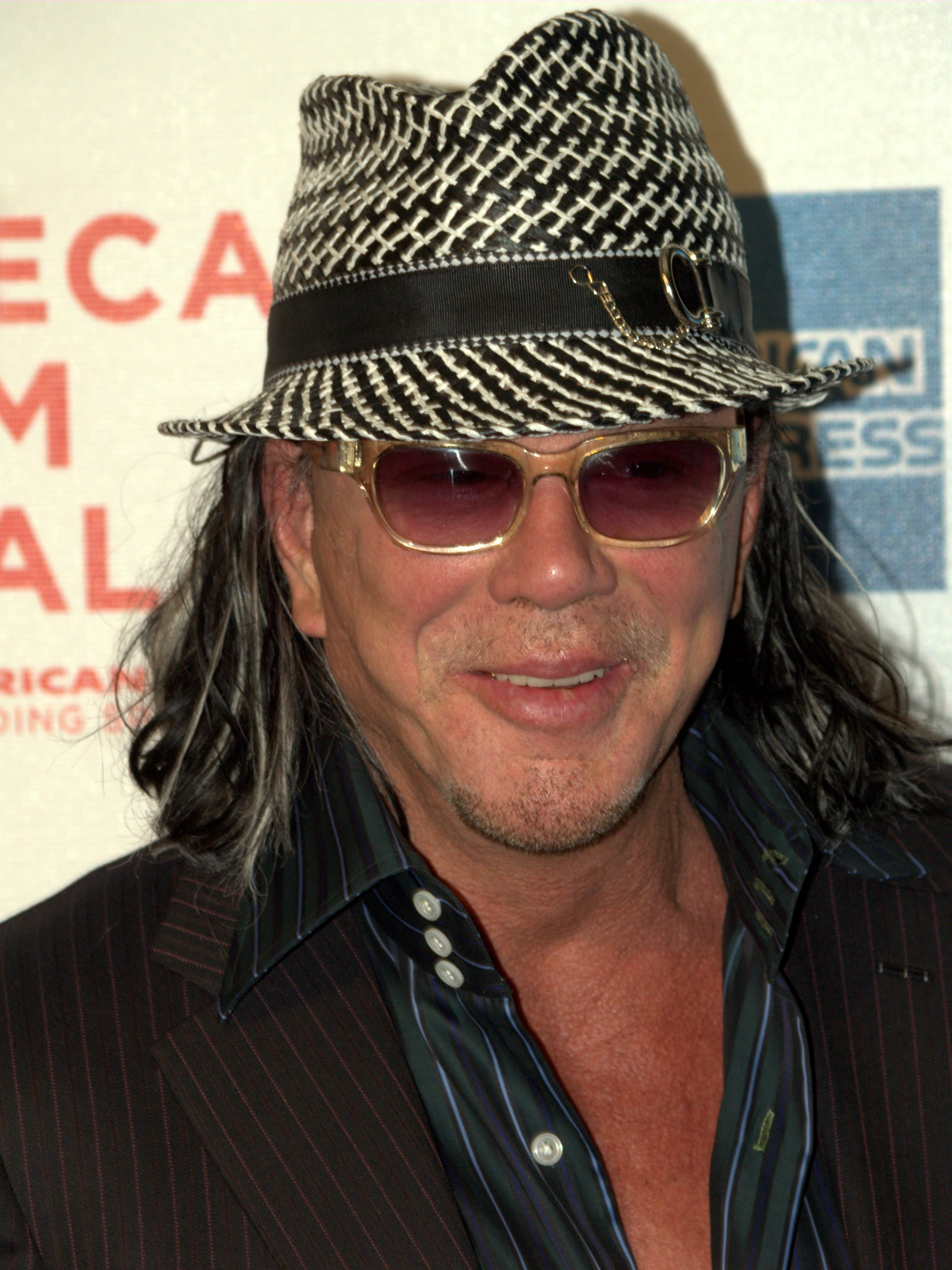
Mickey Rourke, Best Male Lead winner

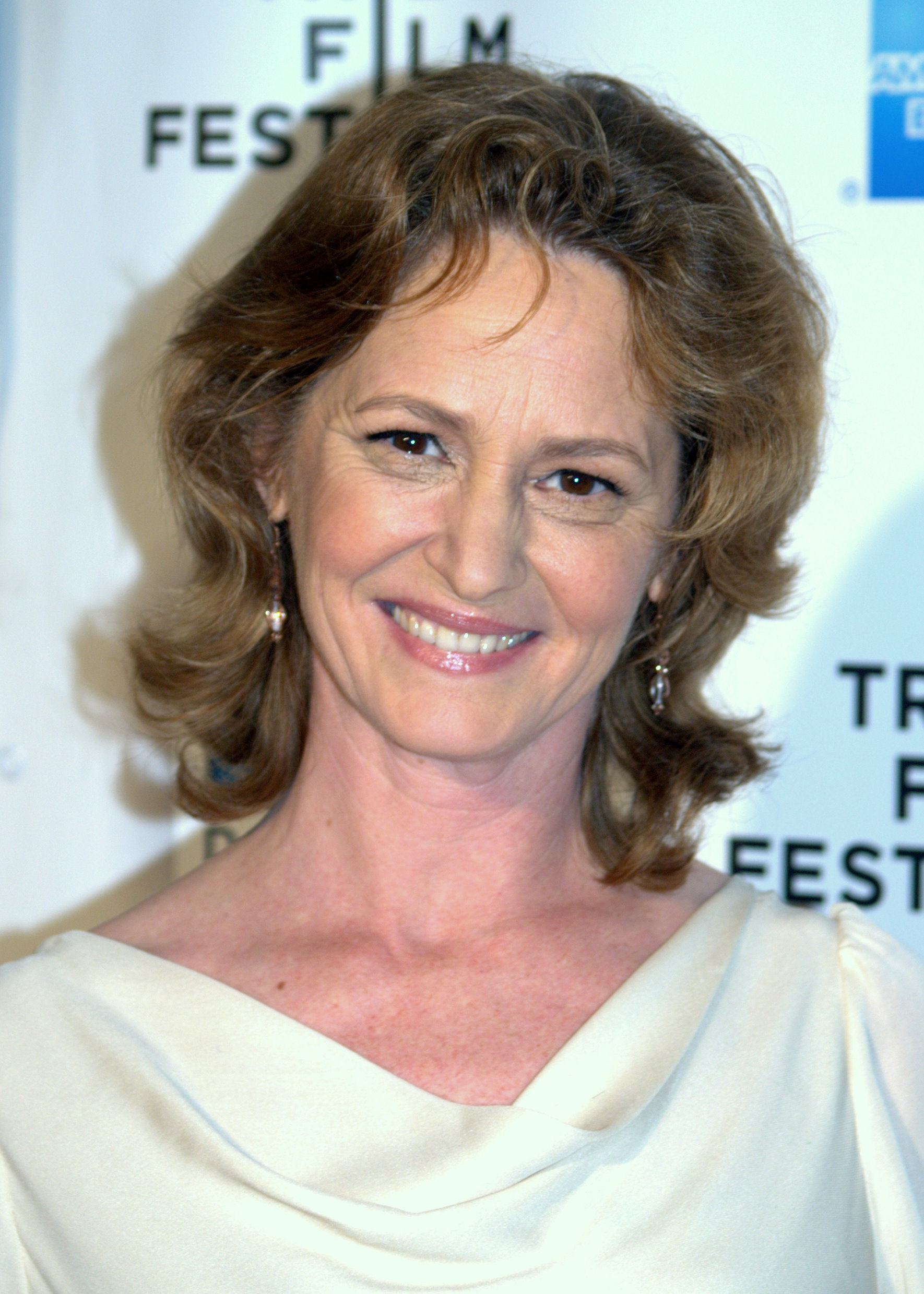
Melissa Leo, Best Female Lead winner

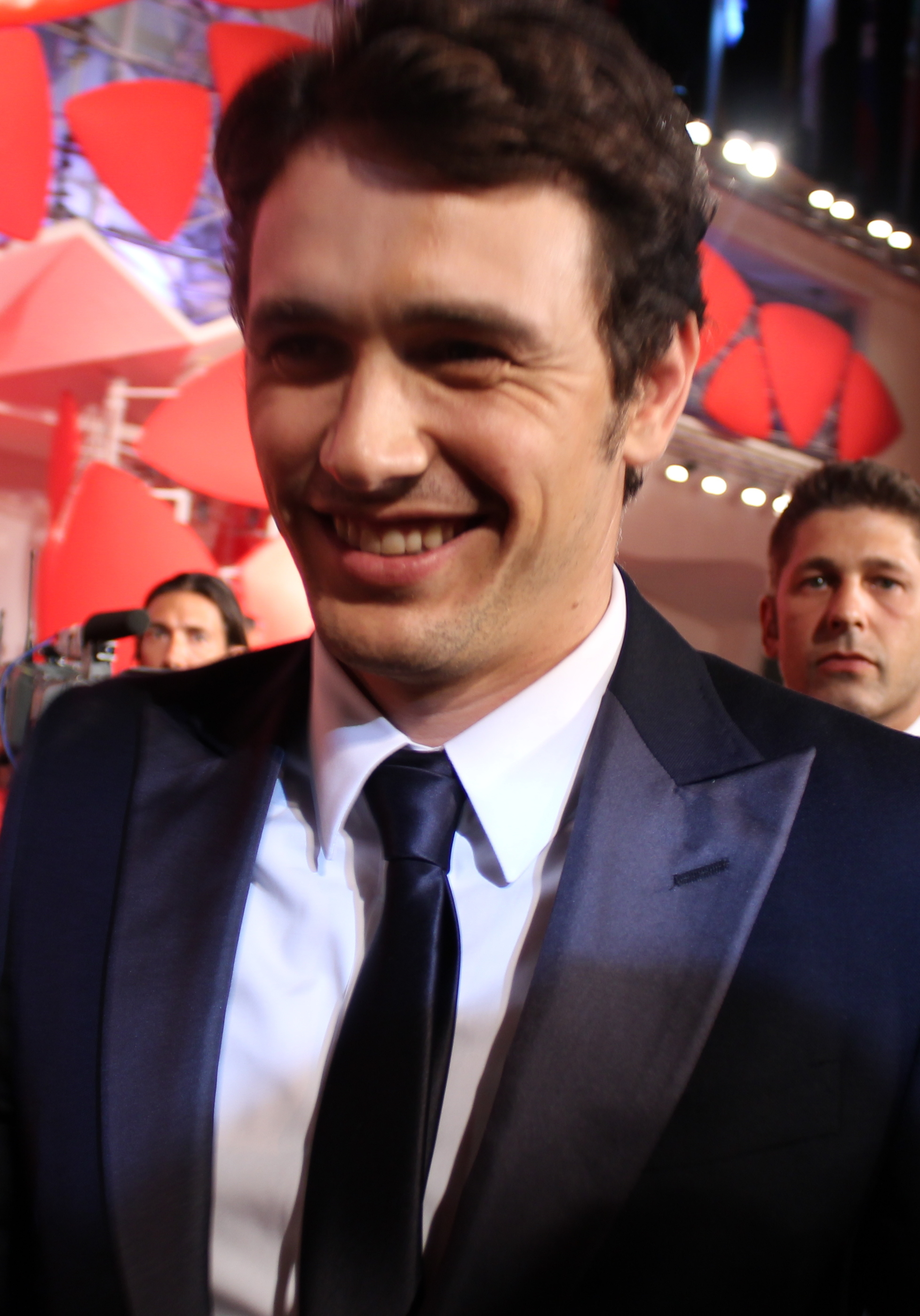
James Franco, Best Supporting Male winner

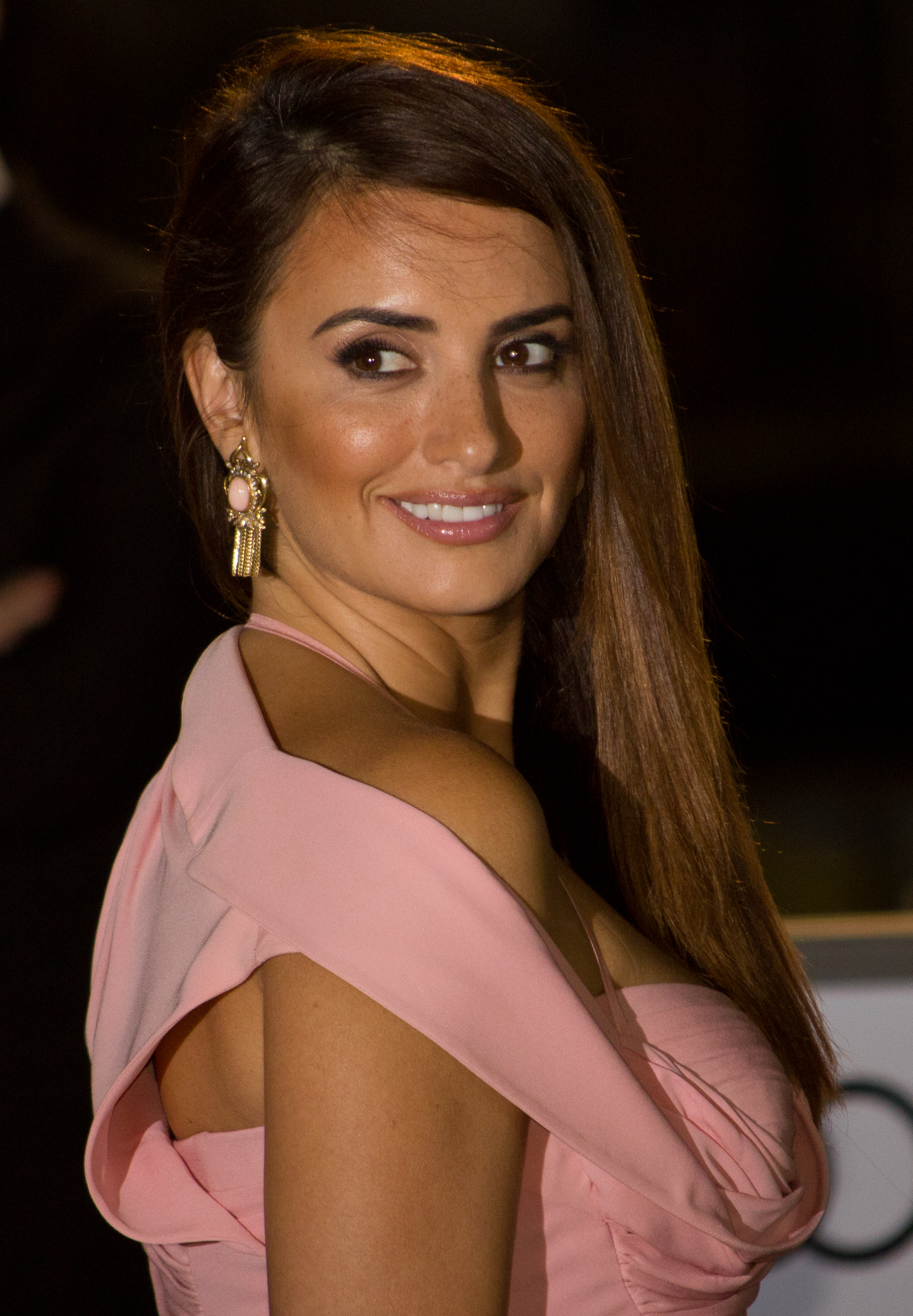
Penélope Cruz, Best Supporting Female winner

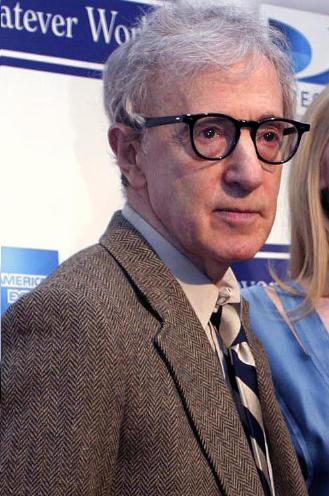
Woody Allen, Best Screenplay winner

Best Feature	Best Director
The Wrestler: Ballast; Frozen River; Rachel Getting Married; Wendy and Lucy	Tom McCarthy – The Visitor: Ramin Bahrani – Chop Shop; Jonathan Demme – Rachel Getting Married; Lance Hammer – Ballast; Courtney Hunt – Frozen River
Best Male Lead	Best Female Lead
Mickey Rourke – The Wrestler: Javier Bardem – Vicky Cristina Barcelona; Richard Jenkins – The Visitor; Sean Penn – Milk; Jeremy Renner – The Hurt Locker	Melissa Leo – Frozen River: Summer Bishil – Towelhead; Anne Hathaway – Rachel Getting Married; Tarra Riggs – Ballast; Michelle Williams – Wendy and Lucy
Best Supporting Male	Best Supporting Female
James Franco – Milk: Anthony Mackie – The Hurt Locker; Charlie McDermott – Frozen River; Jim Myron Ross – Ballast; Haaz Sleiman – The Visitor	Penélope Cruz – Vicky Cristina Barcelona: Rosemarie DeWitt – Rachel Getting Married; Rosie Perez – The Take; Misty Upham – Frozen River; Debra Winger – Rachel Getting Married
Best Screenplay	Best First Screenplay
Vicky Cristina Barcelona – Woody Allen: Sangre de Mi Sangre – Christopher Zalla; Savage Grace – Howard A. Rodman; Sugar – Anna Boden and Ryan Fleck; Synecdoche, New York – Charlie Kaufman	Milk – Dustin Lance Black: Ballast – Lance Hammer; Frozen River – Courtney Hunt; Rachel Getting Married – Jenny Lumet; The Wackness – Jonathan Levine
Best First Feature	Best Documentary
Synecdoche, New York: Afterschool; Medicine for Melancholy; Sangre de Mi Sangre; Sleep Dealer	Man on Wire: The Betrayal; Encounters at the End of the World; The Order of Myths; Up the Yangtze
Best Cinematography	Best Foreign Film
The Wrestler – Maryse Alberti: Ballast – Lol Crawley; Chop Shop – Michael Simmonds; Medicine for Melancholy – James Laxton; Milk – Harris Savides	The Class • France: Gomorrah • Italy; Hunger • Ireland/UK; The Secret of the Grain • France; Silent Light • Mexico/France/Netherlands/Germany

=== Films with multiple nominations and awards ===
Films that received multiple nominations
Nominations	Film
6	Ballast
6	Frozen River
6	Rachel Getting Married
4	Milk
3	The Visitor
3	The Wrestler
2	Chop Shop
2	The Hurt Locker
2	Wendy and Lucy
2	Sangre de Mi Sangre
2	Synecdoche, New York
2	Vicky Cristina Barcelona

Films that won multiple awards
Awards	Film
3	The Wrestler
2	Synecdoche, New York
2	Vicky Cristina Barcelona

== Special awards ==
=== John Cassavetes Award ===
In Search of a Midnight Kiss

- Prince of Broadway
- The Signal
- Take Out
- Turn the River

=== Truer Than Fiction Award ===
The Order of Myths

- Anvil! The Story of Anvil
- Loot

=== Producers Award ===
Heather Rae – Frozen River and Ibid

- Lars Knudsen and Jay Van Hoy – Treeless Mountain and I'll Come Running
- Jason Orans – Goodbye Solo and Year of the Fish

=== Someone to Watch Award ===
Lynn Shelton – My Effortless Brilliance

- Barry Jenkins – Medicine for Melancholy
- Nina Paley – Sita Sings the Blues

=== Robert Altman Award ===
- Synecdoche, New York — Charlie Kaufman, Jeanne McCarthy, Hope Davis, Philip Seymour Hoffman, Jennifer Jason Leigh, Catherine Keener, Samantha Morton, Tom Noonan, Emily Watson, Dianne Wiest and Michelle Williams
