= Gotham Independent Film Awards 2008 =

American film award

18th Annual Gotham Independent Film Awards
- Date: December 2, 2008
- Country: United States
- Presented by: Independent Filmmaker Project
- Hosted by: Aasif Mandvi

Highlights
- Most wins: Frozen River (2)
- Most nominations: Ballast (4)
- Best Feature: Frozen River
- Breakthrough Director: Lance Hammer – Ballast
- Website: https://gotham.ifp.org

The 18th Annual Gotham Independent Film Awards, presented by the Independent Filmmaker Project, were held on December 2, 2008. The nominees were announced on October 20, 2008. The ceremony was hosted by Aasif Mandvi.

== Winners and nominees ==
Best Feature: Frozen River; Ballast; Synecdoche, New York; The Visitor; The Wrestler	Best Documentary Feature: Trouble the Water; Chris & Don. A Love Story; Encounters at the End of the World; Man on Wire; Roman Polanski: Wanted and Desired
Breakthrough Director: Lance Hammer – Ballast; Antonio Campos – Afterschool; Dennis Dortch – A Good Day to Be Black and Sexy; Barry Jenkins – Medicine for Melancholy; Alex Rivera – Sleep Dealer	Breakthrough Actor: Melissa Leo – Frozen River as Ray Eddy; Pedro Castaneda – August Evening as Jaime; Rosemarie DeWitt – Rachel Getting Married as Rachel Buchman; Rebecca Hall – Vicky Cristina Barcelona as Vicky; Alejandro Polanco – Chop Shop as Alejandro "Ale"; Micheal J. Smith Sr. – Ballast as Lawrence
Best Ensemble Performance: Synecdoche, New York – Hope Davis, Philip Seymour Hoffman, Catherine Keener, Jennifer Jason Leigh, Samantha Morton, Tom Noonan, Emily Watson, Dianne Wiest, and Michelle Williams (TIE); Vicky Cristina Barcelona – Javier Bardem, Penélope Cruz, Rebecca Hall, and Scarlett Johansson (TIE); Ballast – Johnny McPhail, Tarra Riggs, Jim Myron Ross, and Michael J. Smith Sr.; Rachel Getting Married – Tunde Adebimpe, Rosemarie DeWitt, Anisa George, Anne Hathaway, Bill Irwin, Anna Deavere Smith, Debra Winger, and Mather Zickel; The Visitor – Hiam Abbass, Danai Gurira, Richard Jenkins, and Haaz Sleiman	Best Film Not Playing at a Theater Near You: Sita Sings the Blues; Afterschool; Meadowlark; The New Year Parade; Wellness

=== Gotham Tributes ===
- Penélope Cruz
- Sheila Nevins
- Melvin Van Peebles
- Gus Van Sant
