= National Board of Review Awards 2008 =

Annual US film awards ceremony

80th NBR Awards

January 14, 2009

Best Film:
Slumdog Millionaire

The 80th National Board of Review Awards, honoring the best in film for 2008, were given on 12 January 2009.

== Top 10 Films ==
Slumdog Millionaire (Note: The NBR names a Best Film, and then lists the remaining ten film in alphabetical order.)

- Burn After Reading
- Changeling
- The Curious Case of Benjamin Button
- The Dark Knight
- Defiance
- Frost/Nixon
- Gran Torino
- Milk
- WALL-E
- The Wrestler

== Winners ==
Best Film:

- Slumdog Millionaire

Best Director:

- David Fincher – The Curious Case of Benjamin Button

Best Actor:

- Clint Eastwood – Gran Torino

Best Actress:

- Anne Hathaway – Rachel Getting Married

Best Supporting Actor:

- Josh Brolin – Milk

Best Supporting Actress:

- Penélope Cruz – Vicky Cristina Barcelona

Best Screenplay – Original:

- Nick Schenk – Gran Torino

Best Screenplay – Adapted (tie):

- Simon Beaufoy – Slumdog Millionaire
- Eric Roth – The Curious Case of Benjamin Button

Best Animated Feature:

- WALL-E

Best Foreign Language Film:

- Mongol, Mongolia

Best Documentary Feature:

- Man on Wire

Best Cast:

- Doubt

Breakthrough Male Performances:

- Dev Patel – Slumdog Millionaire

Breakthrough Female Performances:

- Viola Davis – Doubt

Best Directorial Debut:

- Courtney Hunt – Frozen River

Spotlight Award:

- Melissa Leo – Frozen River
- Richard Jenkins – The Visitor

William K. Everson Award for Film History:

- Molly Haskell and Andrew Sarris

Freedom of Expression Award:

- Trumbo

== Top Foreign Films ==
- Mongol, Mongolia
- The Edge of Heaven
- Let the Right One In
- Roman de Gare
- A Secret
- Waltz with Bashir

== Top Documentaries ==
Man on Wire

- American Teen
- The Betrayal – Nerakhoon
- Dear Zachary: A Letter to a Son About His Father
- Encounters at the End of the World
- Roman Polanski: Wanted and Desired

== Top Independent Films ==
- Frozen River
- In Bruges
- In Search of a Midnight Kiss
- Hallam Foe
- Rachel Getting Married
- Snow Angels
- Son of Rambow
- Vicky Cristina Barcelona
- The Visitor
- Wendy and Lucy
