= The Visitor (2007 feature film) =

2007 film by Tom McCarthy

- Theatrical release poster
- Directed by: Tom McCarthy
- Written by: Tom McCarthy
- Produced by: Mary Jane Skalski; Michael London
- Starring: Richard Jenkins; Hiam Abbass; Haaz Sleiman; Danai Gurira
- Cinematography: Oliver Bokelberg
- Edited by: Tom McArdle
- Music by: Jan A. P. Kaczmarek
- Production companies: Groundswell Productions; Participant Productions; Next Wednesday
- Distributed by: Overture Films
- Release dates: September 7, 2007 (TIFF); April 11, 2008 (United States)
- Running time: 103 minutes
- Country: United States
- Languages: English; French; Arabic; Romanian
- Budget: $4 million
- Box office: $18.1 million

The Visitor is a 2007 American drama film written and directed by Tom McCarthy and produced by Michael London and Mary Jane Skalski. Executive producers were Jeff Skoll and Omar Amanat. The film focuses on a lonely man in late middle age whose life changes when a chance encounter with an immigrant couple forces him to face issues relating to identity, immigration, and cross-cultural communication in post-9/11 New York City.

For The Visitor, McCarthy won the 2008 Independent Spirit Award for Best Director, while Richard Jenkins was nominated for Best Actor at the 81st Academy Awards.

== Plot ==
Walter Vale is a widowed Connecticut College economics professor who lives a fairly solitary existence. He fills his days by sometimes taking piano lessons in an effort to emulate his late wife, a classical concert pianist, and infrequently works on a new book. When he is asked to present a paper at an academic conference at New York University, he is not enthusiastic to make the trip, given he is only the nominal co-author and has never even read the complete work. Charles, his department head, insists and Walter is forced to attend.

When he arrives in his old apartment in Manhattan, Walter is startled to find a young unmarried couple living there, having rented it from a swindler named Ivan who claimed it was his. Tarek is an immigrant from Syria, a Palestinian-Syrian djembe player, and Zainab is a Senegalese designer of ethnic jewelry. He later discovers both are illegal immigrants. Although they have no place to go, they hastily pack to leave, but Walter decides to let them stay. Over the next few days, a friendship slowly develops. Tarek teaches Walter to play the drum, and the two men join a group of others at a regular drum circle in Central Park.

On the way home, Tarek is mistakenly charged with subway turnstile jumping, arrested for "failing" to pay his fare (although he actually had), and taken to a detention center for illegal immigrants in Queens. In order to prevent Tarek's deportation from the United States, Walter hires an immigration lawyer. Feeling uncomfortable about remaining in the apartment with Walter, Zainab moves out to live with relatives in the Bronx.

Tarek's mother, Mouna, unexpectedly arrives from her home in Michigan when she is unable to contact her son. Because she is also illegally in the States, she is also unable to visit him at the detention center. Hesitating, she accepts Walter's offer to stay in the apartment, and the two develop a friendship. Walter confesses his life is unfulfilling; he dislikes the single course he has taught for twenty years, and the book he is allegedly writing is nowhere near completion. It is revealed that Mouna's journalist husband died following a lengthy politically motivated imprisonment in Syria, and she is concerned about her son's future prospects if he is deported. The two begin to share a simple domestic existence, with Mouna preparing meals and Walter treating her to The Phantom of the Opera when she mentions her love for the original cast recording Tarek sent her as a gift.

Without warning, Tarek is summarily deported back to Syria. Mouna, left with no one in the States, decides to follow him and to return to live there. On their final night, Mouna joins Walter for a comforting embrace in bed, blaming herself for all that has gone wrong—years earlier, she received a deportation order for her and Tarek but threw out the documents, wanting instead for the two of them to stay in the United States. Walter sees her off at the airport the next day. Alone once again, Walter plays his drum on a subway platform, as Tarek once told him he himself would like to do some time.

== Cast ==
- Richard Jenkins as Walter Vale: McCarthy had Jenkins in mind from the beginning because he has an "amazing and wonderful everyman quality" which helped create the character. After two and a half years of writing he worked with Jenkins to finalize it.
- Haaz Sleiman as Tarek: Before this role Sleiman had never played the drums and had to practice three hours a day for a month and a half. After watching a documentary on Fela Kuti, Sleiman came up with the idea for Tarek to rehearse in his underwear.
- Danai Gurira as Zainab
- Hiam Abbass as Mouna
- Richard Kind as Jacob
- Michael Cumpsty as Charles
- Marian Seldes as Barbara
- Amir Arison as Mr. Shah

== Production ==
The story for the film started with the characters of Tarek and Walter. McCarthy wanted to have those characters interact and creating the story was like "putting pieces of a puzzle together." He first started writing the film during a state-sponsored visit to the Middle East. He says he had "an especially great connection with the people I met in Beirut" and didn't consider the immigration angle until he returned to New York City.

The film was shot on location in New York City. Some scenes were filmed on campus at Wagner College in Staten Island, New York. The soundtrack includes "Open and Close" and "Je'nwi Teni (Don't Gag Me)," written and performed by Nigerian musician/composer Fela Kuti.

== Release ==
The film premiered at the 2007 Toronto International Film Festival and was shown at numerous 2008 festivals, including the Sundance Film Festival, the European Film Market, the Portland International Film Festival, the Miami International Film Festival, South by Southwest, the Dallas International Film Festival, the Phoenix Film Festival, and the Philadelphia International Film Festival. The Visitor was given a limited release in the US on April 11 in 4 theaters and earned $86,488 with an average of $21,622 per theater ranking 45th at the box office. The film's widest release was 270 theaters and it ended up earning $9,427,089 domestically and $8,651,086 internationally for a total of $18,078,175, above its $4 million production budget.

== Critical reception ==
The Visitor received mostly positive reviews from critics and has a rating of 90% on Rotten Tomatoes based on 119 reviews. The consensus states "The Visitor is a heartfelt, humanistic drama that deftly explores identity, immigration, and other major post-9/11 issues." The film also has a score of 79 out of 100 on Metacritic based on 29 reviews.

A. O. Scott of the New York Times observed, "The curious thing about The Visitor is that even as it goes more or less where you think it will, it still manages to surprise you along the way ... It is possible to imagine a version of this story ... that would be obvious and sentimental, an exercise in cultural condescension and liberal masochism. Indeed, it’s nearly impossible to imagine it any other way. And yet, astonishingly enough, Mr. McCarthy has. Much as The Station Agent nimbly evaded the obstacles of cuteness and willful eccentricity it had strewn in its own path, so does The Visitor, with impressive grace and understatement, resist potential triteness and phony uplift."

Roger Ebert of the Chicago Sun-Times rated the film 3½ out of four stars and called it "a wonderful film, sad, angry, and without a comforting little happy ending". He added, "All four actors are charismatic, in quite different ways ... Jenkins creates a surprisingly touching, very quiet, character study. Not all actors have to call out to us. The better ones make us call out to them."

Ruthe Stein of the San Francisco Chronicle wrote, "Devotees of The Station Agent will be relieved to know that writer-director Tom McCarthy gives no indication of a sophomore slump. His second film ... is, if anything, more imaginative and touching than his first. McCarthy puts a mark on each film, identifying it as distinctly his own. A couple more like them, and he'll be knighted an auteur ... Jenkins' multilevel performance is continually surprising ... The part of Walter was written for [him], and he inhabits it like a second skin."

Peter Travers of Rolling Stone rated the film 3½ out of four stars, calling it "a heartfelt human drama that sneaks up and floors you." He described screenwriter/director McCarthy as "that rare talent who can work in miniature to reveal major truths [and] ... is attuned to the nuances of behavior" and wrote "Jenkins delivers a master class in acting. Oscar, take note."

John Anderson of Variety wrote, "Some films click from the moment they're cast, and that is certainly the case with The Visitor ... a perfect vehicle for Richard Jenkins [who] ... plays McCarthy's transfigured hero to a tee ... Visitor tilts toward the soulful rather than the political, and could be this year's humanistic indie hit."

Peter Rainer of the Christian Science Monitor graded the film C+, criticizing Richard Jenkins' "underpowered" performance and the film's "squishy humanism."

The film was named best of the year by the Washington Post, the Charlotte Observer, and the Arkansas Democrat-Gazette. It also was cited as one of the year's ten best by numerous publications, including the Chicago Reader, the Philadelphia Inquirer, the Seattle Post-Intelligencer, The Hollywood Reporter, The Wall Street Journal, and the New York Post.

=== Accolades ===
Award	Category	Nominee(s)	Result	Ref.
AARP Movies for Grownups Awards	Best Intergenerational Film		Won	
AARP Movies for Grownups Awards	Best Actor	Richard Jenkins	Nominated	
Academy Awards	Best Actor	Richard Jenkins	Nominated	
Alliance of Women Film Journalists Awards	Best Actor	Richard Jenkins	Nominated	
Alliance of Women Film Journalists Awards	Best Screenplay, Original	Tom McCarthy	Nominated	
Boston Society of Film Critics Awards	Best Actor	Richard Jenkins	Runner-up	
Boston Society of Film Critics Awards	Best Ensemble Cast		Nominated	
Brisbane International Film Festival	Interfaith Award	Tom McCarthy	Nominated	
Chicago Film Critics Association Awards	Best Actor	Richard Jenkins	Nominated	
Chlotrudis Awards	Best Actor	Richard Jenkins	Won	
Chlotrudis Awards	Best Supporting Actress	Hiam Abbass	Nominated	
Chlotrudis Awards	Best Original Screenplay	Tom McCarthy	Nominated	
Critics' Choice Movie Awards	Best Actor	Richard Jenkins	Nominated	
Dallas-Fort Worth Film Critics Association Awards	Best Film		6th Place	
Dallas-Fort Worth Film Critics Association Awards	Best Actor	Richard Jenkins	5th Place	
David di Donatello Awards	Best Foreign Film	Tom McCarthy	Nominated	
Deauville American Film Festival	Grand Prix	Tom McCarthy	Won	
FICE - Federazione Italiana Cinema d'Essai	Best Actress	Hiam Abbass (also for Lemon Tree)	Won	
Gold Derby Film Awards	Best Lead Actor	Richard Jenkins	Nominated	
Gotham Independent Film Awards	Best Feature		Nominated	
Gotham Independent Film Awards	Best Ensemble Performance	Hiam Abbass, Danai Gurira, Richard Jenkins, and Haaz Sleiman	Nominated	
Houston Film Critics Society Awards	Best Actor	Richard Jenkins	Nominated	
Humanitas Prize	Sundance Feature Film	Tom McCarthy	Nominated	
Independent Spirit Awards	Best Director	Tom McCarthy	Won	
Independent Spirit Awards	Best Male Lead	Richard Jenkins	Nominated	
Independent Spirit Awards	Best Supporting Male	Haaz Sleiman	Nominated	
International Cinephile Society Awards	Best Actor	Richard Jenkins	Nominated	
International Cinephile Society Awards	Best Supporting Actress	Hiam Abbass	Nominated	
International Online Cinema Awards	Best Actor	Richard Jenkins	Nominated	
Method Fest Independent Film Festival	Best Director	Tom McCarthy	Won	
Method Fest Independent Film Festival	Best Actor	Richard Jenkins	Won	
Method Fest Independent Film Festival	Best Supporting Actress	Danai Gurira	Won	
Moscow International Film Festival	Golden St. George	Tom McCarthy	Nominated	
Moscow International Film Festival	Best Actor	Richard Jenkins	Won	
NAACP Image Awards	Outstanding Independent Motion Picture		Nominated	
National Board of Review Awards	Top 10 Independent Films		Won	
National Board of Review Awards	Spotlight Award	Richard Jenkins	Won	
Online Film & Television Association Awards	Best Breakthrough Performance: Male	Haaz Sleiman	Nominated	
Online Film Critics Society Awards	Best Actor	Richard Jenkins	Nominated	
San Diego Film Critics Society Awards	Best Screenplay – Original	Tom McCarthy	Won	
San Diego Film Critics Society Awards	Special Award	Richard Jenkins (For his body of work in 2008)	Won	
Santa Barbara International Film Festival	Virtuoso Award	Richard Jenkins	Won	
Satellite Awards	Best Actor in a Motion Picture – Drama	Richard Jenkins	Won	
Satellite Awards	Best Director	Tom McCarthy	Nominated	
Satellite Awards	Best Screenplay – Original	Tom McCarthy	Won	
Satellite Awards	Best Overall DVD		Nominated	
Screen Actors Guild Awards	Outstanding Performance by a Male Actor in a Leading Role	Richard Jenkins	Nominated	
Southeastern Film Critics Association Awards	Best Picture		8th Place	
St. Louis Gateway Film Critics Association Awards	Best Actor	Richard Jenkins	Nominated	
St. Louis Gateway Film Critics Association Awards	Best Music (Soundtrack or Score, Original or Adapted)	Jan A. P. Kaczmarek	Won	
St. Louis International Film Festival	Best Music	Jan A. P. Kaczmarek	Won	
Utah Film Critics Association Awards	Best Actor	Richard Jenkins	Runner-up	
Warsaw Film Festival	Grand Prix	Tom McCarthy	Nominated	
Writers Guild of America Awards	Best Original Screenplay	Tom McCarthy	Nominated	

=== Home media ===
The DVD was released on October 7, 2008. Viewers have the option of either widescreen anamorphic or fullscreen formats. Bonus features include commentary by writer/director Tom McCarthy and star Richard Jenkins, deleted scenes, a behind-the-scenes look at the making of the film, a history of the djembe and instructions on how to play it, and the original trailer.

== Musical adaptation ==
A musical adaptation of The Visitor premiered at The Public Theater in previews on October 16, 2021 and officially opened on November 4.
