= Padre nuestro (2007 film) =

- Theatrical release poster
- Directed by: Christopher Zalla
- Written by: Christopher Zalla
- Produced by: Benjamin Odell; Per Melita
- Starring: Jesús Ochoa; Armando Hernández; Jorge Adrián Espíndola; Paola Mendoza
- Cinematography: Igor Martinovic
- Edited by: Aaron Yanes
- Music by: Brian Cullman
- Production companies: Cinergy Pictures; Panamax Films; Two Lane Pictures
- Distributed by: IFC Films
- Release date: January 22, 2007 (Sundance)
- Running time: 110 minutes
- Countries: United States; Argentina
- Languages: English; Spanish
- Box office: $565,024

Padre nuestro ("Our Father"), also known as Sangre de mi sangre ("Blood of My Blood"), is a 2007 Argentinean-American thriller film written and directed by Christopher Zalla, produced by Benjamin Odell and Per Melita, and starring Jesús Ochoa, Armando Hernández, Jorge Adrián Espíndola, and Paola Mendoza. The film won the Grand Jury Prize at the 2007 Sundance Film Festival.

== Premise ==
Padre nuestro tells the story of Pedro, a young Mexican boy who smuggles himself to Brooklyn to meet his long-lost father, but whose identity is stolen by an impostor.

== Cast ==
- Jesús Ochoa as Diego
- Armando Hernández as Juan
- Jorge Adrián Espíndola as Pedro
- Paola Mendoza as Magda
- Eugenio Derbez as Anibal
- Scott Glascock as John
- Lev Gorn as Rough-Shave

== Release ==
Padre nuestro premiered at the Sundance Film Festival on January 22, 2007, and has been screened at New Directors/New Films Festival. The film was released in Spain on October 5, 2007, and in Mexico on February 29, 2008. It opened in limited release in the United States on May 14, 2008.

== Critical reception ==
On the review aggregator website Rotten Tomatoes, 79% of 39 critics' reviews are positive, with an average rating of 6.8/10/10. The website's consensus reads: "This suspenseful Mexican drama portrays the immigrant experience with grit and poignancy." Metacritic, which uses a weighted average, assigned the film a score of 56 out of 100, based on 12 critics, indicating "mixed or average" reviews.

== Awards and honors ==
- Grand Jury Prize: Dramatic at the 2007 Sundance Film Festival.
- Nominated, Independent Spirit Awards, 2008: Best First Feature (for Zalla, Odell, and Melita) and Best Screenplay (for Zalla)

Awards
Preceded by Quinceañera	Sundance Grand Jury Prize: U.S. Dramatic; 2007	Succeeded by Frozen River
