= Misty Upham =

Native American actress (Blackfeet Nation) (1982-2014)

- Born: Misty Anne Upham; July 6, 1982; Kalispell, Montana, U.S.
- Died: October 5, 2014 (aged 32); Auburn, Washington, U.S.
- Occupation: Actress
- Years active: 2002–2014

Misty Anne Upham (July 6, 1982 – October 5, 2014) was an American actress. She attracted critical acclaim for her performance in the 2008 film Frozen River, for which she was nominated for an Independent Spirit Award for Best Supporting Female. She also appeared in Jimmy P: Psychotherapy of a Plains Indian and August: Osage County.

== Early life ==
Misty Anne Upham was born on July 6, 1982, in Kalispell, Montana, and raised in Auburn, Washington. A Native American, she was a member of the Blackfeet Nation. She was reportedly sexually abused, assaulted, and gang-raped, first as a child and then later in life as an up-and-coming actress in Hollywood by an executive at The Weinstein Company. Both Upham and family members reported that she suffered from depression and the severe after effects of these traumas.

== Career ==
Upham's film credits include Expiration Date, Edge of America, Skins, and Skinwalkers. In 2010, she appeared on HBO's Big Love. In 2013, she played a major supporting role in Arnaud Desplechin's Jimmy P: Psychotherapy of a Plains Indian, selected in competition for the Palme d'Or at the 66th Festival de Cannes. She played the housekeeper Johnna in August: Osage County, and played Liz in Cake.

== Death ==
On October 5, 2014, Upham left her sister's apartment on the Muckleshoot Reservation in Auburn, Washington, on foot. The following weekend, her family announced via Facebook and other media that she had not been heard from since then and that they were concerned for her well-being, citing past mental health problems. A spokesperson for the Auburn Police Department told CNN that police had not opened an investigation and were not regarding Upham as a missing person at that time. He confirmed that family members had contacted police on several occasions in the past year to report Upham missing but that she had been located and determined to be safe within a few days in each previous case.

On October 16, 2014, Misty Upham's body was found by a small search party organized by her family and other members of the Muckleshoot Tribe. Her body was found at the bottom of a cliff in a wooded area, just a short distance from where the family had previously searched. Members of the search party believe her death was an accident; that she fell off the cliff in the dark and that her life could have been saved had there been a prompt and thorough search. Citing lack of action on the part of the Auburn police, and alleging past abuse of Misty Upham by members of the Auburn Police Department, Upham's family released a statement that reads in part:

"But the real tragedy is this could have been prevented on a lot of levels. We pleaded with the Auburn Police to help us find Misty, but Commander Stocker made the decision that Misty did not fit the criteria of the Washington State Endangered Missing Persons Plan. This became a point of contention between us and the Auburn PD. In a statement he gave to the press, he said Auburn PD doesn't have any evidence that Misty is actually missing. He went on to say that Misty packed her belongings and left her apartment. This was an inaccurate statement. We believe that Commander Stocker had animosity against Misty due to a previous encounter."

"Now press reports are saying that Auburn police department found Misty. The truth is the Native American community formed a search party and found her after several days of searching without the help of the Auburn PD".

On December 3, 2014, the King County Medical Examiner released a report stating Misty Upham had died of blunt-force injuries to her head and torso on October 5, 2014, the day she disappeared. The medical examiner stated that "the manner of her death – whether by foul play, suicide or accident – could not be determined."

In late October 2016, the release of a documentary short on Upham was announced. The film, 11 Days - The Search for Misty Upham, investigates her disappearance and death, and the search for her led by her family in what they report was the absence of police support. It was screened at Native American film festivals, notably in the broader context of the issue of Missing and Murdered Indigenous Women.

On October 15, 2017, in the wake of the Harvey Weinstein sexual abuse allegations, Upham's father, Charles Upham, went public with allegations that his daughter was raped by a member of Weinstein's production team at the same Golden Globes ceremony where she was honored, and that other members of Weinstein's team had not only witnessed the rape but had cheered the rapist.

== Legacy ==
In 2021, the Yale Indigenous Performing Arts Program created the Misty Upham Award for Young Native Actors to honor Upham's legacy and her hope of uplifting more young Native actors. Each year the Program honors a Native actor under 25 with an award, a $500 cash prize, and performance opportunities. Young actors submit performances of monologues from Native plays for a chance to win the award.

== Filmography ==
Year	Title	Role	Director	Notes
2002	Skins	Mrs. Blue Cloud	Chris Eyre	
2002	Auf Wiedersehen, Pet	Dawn	Paul Seed	TV series (2 episodes)
2002	Skinwalkers	Nina	Chris Eyre	TV movie
2003	Dreamkeeper	Chief's Daughter	Steve Barron	TV movie
2003	Edge of America	Shirleen	Chris Eyre	TV movie
2006	Expiration Date	Charlie's Mother	Rick Stevenson	
2008	Frozen River	Lila Littlewolf	Courtney Hunt	American Indian Film Festival for Best Supporting Actress; Alliance of Women Film Journalists for Best Newcomer; Nominated–Independent Spirit Award for Best Supporting Female; Nominated–Central Ohio Film Critics Association for Best Supporting Actress; Nominated–Utah Film Critics Association for Best Supporting Actress
2010	The Dry Land	Gloria	Ryan Piers Williams	
2010	Big Love	Leila Stilwell	Adam Davidson; David Petrarca	TV series (2 episodes)
2011	Mascots	Karen	Scott Aaron Hartmann	Short
2012	Django Unchained	Minnie	Quentin Tarantino	
2012	Every Other Second	Nurse Kelly	Harrison Sanborn	Short
2013	Jimmy P: Psychotherapy of a Plains Indian	Jane	Arnaud Desplechin	
2013	August: Osage County	Johnna Monevata	John Wells	Hollywood Film Festival - Ensemble of the Year; Capri Ensemble Cast Award; Nominated–Screen Actors Guild Award for Outstanding Performance by a Cast in a Motion Picture; Nominated–Phoenix Film Critics Society Award for Best Cast
2013	Without Fire	May	Eliza McNitt	Short
2014	Cake	Liz	Daniel Barnz	
2015	Within	Tina Walsh	Phil Claydon	Released Posthumously
