= Frozen River =

2008 American crime drama film

- Theatrical release poster
- Directed by: Courtney Hunt
- Written by: Courtney Hunt
- Produced by: Heather Rae; Chip Hourihan
- Starring: Melissa Leo; Misty Upham; Charlie McDermott; Michael O'Keefe; Mark Boone Junior
- Cinematography: Reed Morano
- Edited by: Kate Willams
- Music by: Peter Golub; Shahzad Ali Ismaily
- Production companies: Cohen Media Group; Harwood Hunt Productions; Off Hollywood Pictures
- Distributed by: Sony Pictures Classics
- Release dates: January 18, 2008 (Sundance); August 1, 2008 (Limited); September 5, 2008 (United States)
- Running time: 97 minutes
- Country: United States
- Languages: English; French; Chinese; Urdu
- Budget: $1 million
- Box office: $6 million

Frozen River is a 2008 American crime drama film written and directed by Courtney Hunt in her feature directorial debut. Starring Melissa Leo and Misty Upham, the film follows two working-class mothers who team up to earn money by smuggling undocumented immigrants from Canada to the United States.

Frozen River premiered at the Sundance Film Festival on January 18, 2008, where it won the Grand Jury Prize. Following a limited release on August 1, 2008, the film opened in theatres on September 5, 2008, to critical acclaim, with particular praise for Leo's performance and Hunt's direction. The film earned several accolades, including the Bronze Horse at the 2008 Stockholm International Film Festival. At the 81st Academy Awards, Leo was nominated for Best Actress and Hunt was nominated for Best Original Screenplay.

== Plot ==
The film is set shortly before Christmas in the North Country of Upstate New York, near the Akwesasne ('Where the Partridge Drums') St. Regis Mohawk Reservation and the border crossing to Cornwall, Ontario. Ray Eddy (Melissa Leo) is a discount store clerk struggling to raise two sons with her husband, a compulsive gambler who has disappeared with the funds she had earmarked to finance the purchase of a double-wide mobile home. While searching for him, she encounters Lila Littlewolf (Misty Upham), a Mohawk bingo-parlor employee who is driving his car, which she claims she found abandoned with the keys in the ignition at the local bus station. The two women, who have both fallen on hard economic times, form a desperate and uneasy alliance and begin smuggling undocumented immigrants from Canada into the United States across the frozen St. Lawrence River for $1,200 each.

Ray's older son T.J. wants to find a job and help support the family so they can afford to eat something more substantial than popcorn and Tang. He and his mother clash over whether he should remain in high-school and look after his little brother Ricky or drop out to work. To make matters worse, T.J. sets an outside corner of the trailer afire with a torch in an attempt to unfreeze the water pipe. Lila longs for the day she will be able to reclaim and live with her young son, who was taken from her by her mother-in-law immediately after his birth.

Because the women's route takes them from an Indian reservation in the US to an Indian reserve in Canada, they hope to avoid detection by local law-enforcement. However, their problems escalate when they are asked to smuggle a Pakistani couple and Ray, fearful their duffel bag might contain explosives, leaves it behind in sub-freezing temperatures, only to discover it contained their infant baby when they arrive at their destination. She and Lila retrace their route and find the bag and the baby, which Lila insists is dead, but which she revives moments before being reunited with the baby's parents. The experience leaves her shaken, and she announces she no longer wants to participate in the smuggling operation. But Ray, needing just one more crossing to finance the down payment on her mobile home, coerces her into joining her for one last journey.

They pick up two Asian women from a strip club for crossing. When the club owner tries to short them, Ray successfully threatens him with a gun. When she is re-entering her car, the irate club owner retaliates by shooting Ray in the ear. Shaken, her fast and erratic driving catches the attention of the provincial police. Ray tries to elude capture by crossing the frozen river where one of the wheels of the car breaks through the ice. The four women abandon the vehicle and take refuge at the Indian reservation.

Because the police are demanding a scapegoat, the tribal head decides to excommunicate Lila for five years due to her smuggling history which involved the death of her Mohawk husband. Surprised then saddened by the news, Ray gives in to Lila's pleas to go free for the sake of her children. However, running through the woods, Ray has a fit of conscience and returns. Ray gives her share of money to Lila with instructions for taking care of her (Ray's) sons and seeing through the purchase plans for a mobile home. Ray and the undocumented immigrants are surrendered to the police and a trooper speculates she will have to serve four months in jail. Ray calls her son T.J. to explain what has happened.

Lila pushes her way into her mother-in-law's home and reclaims her infant son. She and the baby show up at the Eddy trailer while T.J. is still on the phone with his jailed mother. In a day scene, T.J. completes the welding of a bicycle-propelled carousel bearing his younger brother and Lila's strapped in baby. He pedals the carousel while Lila smiles on. A truck nears carrying the new mobile home.

== Cast ==
- Melissa Leo as Ray Eddy
- Misty Upham as Lila Littlewolf
- Charlie McDermott as Troy "T.J." Eddy Jr.
- Michael O'Keefe as State Trooper Finnerty
- Mark Boone Junior as Jacques Bruno
- James Reilly as Ricky Eddy
- Dylan Carusona as Jimmy
- Jay Klaitz as Guy Versailles
- Michael Sky as Billy Three Rivers
- John Canoe as Bernie Littlewolf

== Production ==
In an interview screenwriter/director Courtney Hunt conducted shortly before the film's release, she discussed its prevalent theme of a mother's love for her children being a culturally universal trait. She stated the most important moment in her life was the birth of her daughter and how that event made all her other goals lesser priorities. By showing how such intimacy knows no bounds, culturally or socially, Hunt said she hoped her film would enable audiences to break down their assumptions about others around them.

Hunt's husband is from Malone, New York. Whenever the two visited his family they heard stories about Mohawks smuggling cigarettes by driving across the Saint Lawrence River when it freezes. She thought the concept was an interesting subject for a film but had a hard time getting any financial backers because so few people knew about the issue. She met cinematographer Marc Blandori and actress Melissa Leo at the FilmColumbia 2003 Film Festival in Chatham, New York and both agreed to join the project, which prompted some interest from investors. The first effort was a short film shot at Akwesasne near Massena, New York. Hunt showed it at several festival screenings and shopped it to producers until she finally acquired enough funding for a feature film. Frozen River was shot in sub-freezing temperatures on location in Clinton County and Beekmantown and in the area around Plattsburgh over a period of twenty-four days in March 2007.

== Release ==
The film premiered at the Sundance Film Festival and was shown at the MoMA Film Exhibition, the Seattle International Film Festival, the Provincetown International Film Festival, the Nantucket Film Festival, the Melbourne International Film Festival, and the Traverse City Film Festival. Sony Pictures Classics paid $500,000 for the rights to distribute the film in North America, later acquiring rights to distribute in Latin America, Australia and New Zealand as well. The film eventually grossed $2,511,476 in limited theatrical release in the United States and $2,621,734 in foreign markets for a total worldwide box office of $5,133,210.

== Critical reception ==
Critical reception for the film was very positive. Frozen River has an approval rating of 88% on review aggregator website Rotten Tomatoes, based on 135 reviews, and an average rating of 7.31/10. The website's critical consensus states, "Veteran character actress Melissa Leo delivers a stunning performance in this powerful -- if grim -- indie film". It also has a score of 82 out of 100 on Metacritic, based on 30 critics, indicating "universal acclaim". The film appeared on many lists citing the best films of 2008, including those in The Philadelphia Inquirer, the Los Angeles Times, The Hollywood Reporter, the New York Post, The Miami Herald, the Arkansas Democrat-Gazette, The New York Times, and the Chicago Reader. Roger Ebert of the Chicago Sun-Times gave Frozen River four stars (out of four) and called it "one of those rare independent films that knows precisely what it intends, and what the meaning of the story is", while Stephen Holden wrote in The New York Times on August 1, 2008, that "Leo’s magnificent portrayal of a woman of indomitable grit and not an iota of self-pity makes "Frozen River" a compelling study of individual courage" and "If "Frozen River" is a social realist film, it has no political axes to grind."

== Awards and nominations ==
| Year | Ceremony | Category | Recipients | Result |
|---|---|---|---|---|
| 2008 | 13th Satellite Awards | Top 10 Films | Frozen River | Nominated |
| 2008 | 13th Satellite Awards | Best Film - Drama | Frozen River | Nominated |
| 2008 | 13th Satellite Awards | Best Actress - Drama | Melissa Leo | Nominated |
| 2008 | 13th Satellite Awards | Best Screenplay - Original | Courtney Hunt | Nominated |
| 2008 | 14th Critics' Choice Awards | Best Actress | Melissa Leo | Nominated |
| 2008 | 15th Screen Actors Guild Awards | Best Female Actor in a Leading Role | Melissa Leo | Nominated |
| 2008 | 24th Independent Spirit Awards | Best Feature | Frozen River | Nominated |
| 2008 | 24th Independent Spirit Awards | Best Director | Courtney Hunt | Nominated |
| 2008 | 24th Independent Spirit Awards | Best Female Lead | Melissa Leo | Won |
| 2008 | 24th Independent Spirit Awards | Best Supporting Male | Charlie McDermott | Nominated |
| 2008 | 24th Independent Spirit Awards | Best Supporting Female | Misty Upham | Nominated |
| 2008 | 24th Independent Spirit Awards | Best First Screenplay | Courtney Hunt | Nominated |
| 2008 | 81st Academy Awards | Best Actress | Melissa Leo | Nominated |
| 2008 | 81st Academy Awards | Best Original Screenplay | Courtney Hunt | Nominated |
| 2008 | 2008 Los Angeles Film Critics Association Awards | Best Actress | Melissa Leo | Nominated |
| 2008 | 2008 National Society of Film Critics Awards | Best Actress | Melissa Leo | Nominated |
| 2008 | 2008 New York Film Critics Circle Awards | Best First Film | Frozen River | Won |
| 2008 | 2008 New York Film Critics Circle Awards | Best Actress | Melissa Leo | Nominated |
| 2008 | American Indian Film Festival | Best Supporting Actress | Misty Upham | Won |
| 2008 | Central Ohio Film Critics Association | Best Actress | Melissa Leo | Won |
| 2008 | Central Ohio Film Critics Association | Best Supporting Actress | Misty Upham | Nominated |
| 2008 | Central Ohio Film Critics Association | Best Screenplay - Original | Courtney Hunt | Nominated |
| 2008 | Chicago Film Critics Association Awards 2008 | Best Actress | Melissa Leo | Nominated |
| 2008 | Chicago Film Critics Association Awards 2008 | Most Promising Filmmaker | Courtney Hunt | Nominated |
| 2008 | Detroit Film Critics Society | Best Actress | Melissa Leo | Nominated |
| 2008 | Florida Film Critics Circle Awards 2008 | Best Actress | Melissa Leo | Won |
| 2008 | Gotham Independent Film Awards 2008 | Best Feature | Frozen River | Won |
| 2008 | Gotham Independent Film Awards 2008 | Breakthrough Actor | Melissa Leo | Won |
| 2008 | Houston Film Critics Society Awards 2008 | Best Actress in a Leading Role | Melissa Leo | Nominated |
| 2008 | Marrakech International Film Festival | Best Actress | Melissa Leo | Won |
| 2008 | National Board of Review Awards 2008 | Top Independent Films | Frozen River | Nominated |
| 2008 | National Board of Review Awards 2008 | Best Directorial Debut | Courtney Hunt | Won |
| 2008 | Stockholm International Film Festival | Best Film | Frozen River | Won |
| 2008 | Sundance Film Festival | Grand Jury Prize - Dramatic | Frozen River | Won |
| 2008 | Toronto Film Critics Association Awards 2008 | Best First Feature | Frozen River | Nominated |
| 2008 | Utah Film Critics Association Awards 2008 | Best Actress | Melissa Leo | Won |
| 2008 | Utah Film Critics Association Awards 2008 | Best Supporting Actress | Misty Upham | Nominated |

== Home media ==
Frozen River was released in anamorphic widescreen format on DVD on February 10, 2009. It has an audio track in English and subtitles in French. Bonus features include an audio commentary by screenwriter/director Courtney Hunt and producer Heather Rae, and the original trailer.

Awards
| Preceded by Padre Nuestro | Sundance Grand Jury Prize: U.S. Dramatic; 2008 | Succeeded by Precious |
