= Courtney Hunt =

American director and screenwriter (born 1964)

- Born: 1964 (age 61–62); Memphis, Tennessee, United States
- Education: Sarah Lawrence College (BA); Northeastern University (JD); Columbia University (MFA)
- Occupations: Film director, screenwriter
- Spouse: Donald Harwood
- Children: 1

Courtney Hunt (born 1964) is an American film director and screenwriter. She is best known for directing Frozen River, which won the Grand Jury Prize at the 2008 Sundance Film Festival, and was nominated for two Academy Awards.

== Early life and education ==
Hunt was raised in Memphis and Nashville, Tennessee by a single mother. Hunt attended The Field School in Washington, D.C. and graduated from Sarah Lawrence College before following her mother's educational path and attending law school at Northeastern University. She then graduated in 1994 from New York's Columbia University in film when she realized law was not an interest for her. Even though law was not a field she would be going into, it gave her a new perspective on the world. In an interview with Film Catcher on YouTube, Hunt stated that law school gave her the opportunity and experience of attending co-op jobs that allowed her to work for a federal judge and a criminal defence firm. Her husband would give her murder appeals from which she learned about dialogue and point of view from the transcripts which built onto her knowledge of film and how to write screenplays. Shortly after graduating from her film class, Hunt began to write and develop the story for her film Frozen River, by researching the Mohawk people.

== Career ==
=== Frozen River ===
Hunt directed and wrote the screenplay for Frozen River, a film starring Melissa Leo, Misty Upham, and Charlie McDermott in 2008. Frozen River received 2 nominations at the 81st Academy Awards, an Best Original Screenplay nomination for Hunt, and an Best Actress nomination for Leo.

Hunt is a film screenwriter and director, but she also wants to be seen as a director for hire so that filmmakers could see her in control of both aspects.

Frozen River was originally a short film and it first premiered in 2004 at the New York Film Festival. The development and writing of Frozen River was a lengthy process for Hunt. She began writing the film after her graduation from college, but put the story away since she was not convinced that she had found the right angle for the story at that moment. Many years later, she turned her initial idea into a poem and enlarged it into a screenplay for a short film and then for a feature-length film. At first, her idea of the story was going to be about the Mohawk People trafficking cigarettes across the Canada–US border, but it then became a story about smuggling illegal immigrants from Canada into America. Hunt has said in an interview with Women and Hollywood that this film is based on a real situation where the smugglers drive across the St. Lawrence River when it is frozen. In this film, she believes that she is able to show people rural communities that they may have forgotten about. Frozen River was an independent film that had achieved commercial success at the box-office in the United States, as well as in France and Spain. The film was pushed back by a few years due to the 9/11 attack on the World Trade Center. She did not want to make and release the film around this time because she believed that people would not sympathize with these immigrants or smugglers and that the audience members would see it as a way for people to help others into the country.

=== The Whole Truth ===
She directed The Whole Truth (2016), a thriller film starring Keanu Reeves, Renée Zellweger, Gugu Mbatha-Raw, Gabriel Basso and Jim Belushi. Reeves is a defense attorney in the film which follows the court case of a murder. The film was originally supposed to star Skyfall actor, Daniel Craig, but he abruptly dropped out of the film. The lead role then went to Reeves.

== Personal life ==
Hunt is married to Donald Harwood, who raised nearly $1 million to fund the film Frozen River. She has a daughter.

On her views of women in the film business, she believes women can be talked out of becoming a director. She finds that it is easier for women to do smaller roles on the film set rather than become a director.

=== Influence ===
Hunt has said in an interview with David Jenkins that Argentinean director Lucrecia Martel is a filmmaker who inspires her. She met Martel at the Sundance Film Festival. She has also cited Paper Moon as an influence.

== Filmography ==
Year	Title	Role	Notes
2016	The Whole Truth	Director	
2008	Frozen River	Writer, Director	

== Awards and nominations ==
Year	Award	Category	Work	Result	Reference
2008	Academy Award for Best Original Screenplay	Best Original Screenplay	Frozen River	Nominated	
2008	Film Independent Spirit Awards	Best Feature	Frozen River	Nominated	
2008	Film Independent Spirit Awards	Best Director	Frozen River	Nominated	
2008	Sundance Film Festival	Grand Jury Prize	Frozen River	Won	
