= Superficial =

Superficial may refer to:

- Superficial anatomy, is the study of the external features of the body
- Superficiality, the discourses in philosophy regarding social relation
- Superficial charm, the tendency to be smooth, engaging, charming, slick and verbally facile
- Superficial sympathy, false or insincere display of emotion such as a hypocrite crying fake tears of grief

== In entertainment ==
- Superficial (album), an album by Heidi Montag, or its title track
- The Superficial, a website devoted to celebrity gossip
- "Superficial", a song by Natalia Kills from the album Perfectionist

== See also ==
- Artificial (disambiguation)
- Synthetic (disambiguation)
- Man-made (disambiguation)
