= Synth (disambiguation) =

A synthesizer or synth is an electronic musical instrument.

Synth may also refer to:

== Science ==
- Synthetic biology
- Synthetic intelligence

== Media ==
- Synth (video game), a freeware strategic action game that utilizes procedurally generated graphics
- Synth, machines powered by organic components used by the Combine in the Half-Life video game series
- Synth, androids featured in the video game Fallout 4
- Synth, anthropomorphic robots depicted in the television series Humans

== Other uses ==
- Synth Look and Feel, a skinnable Java look and feel

== See also ==
- Synthesis (disambiguation)
- Synthesizer (disambiguation)
- Synthetic (disambiguation)
