= Lac de Bort-les-Orgues =

Lake in France

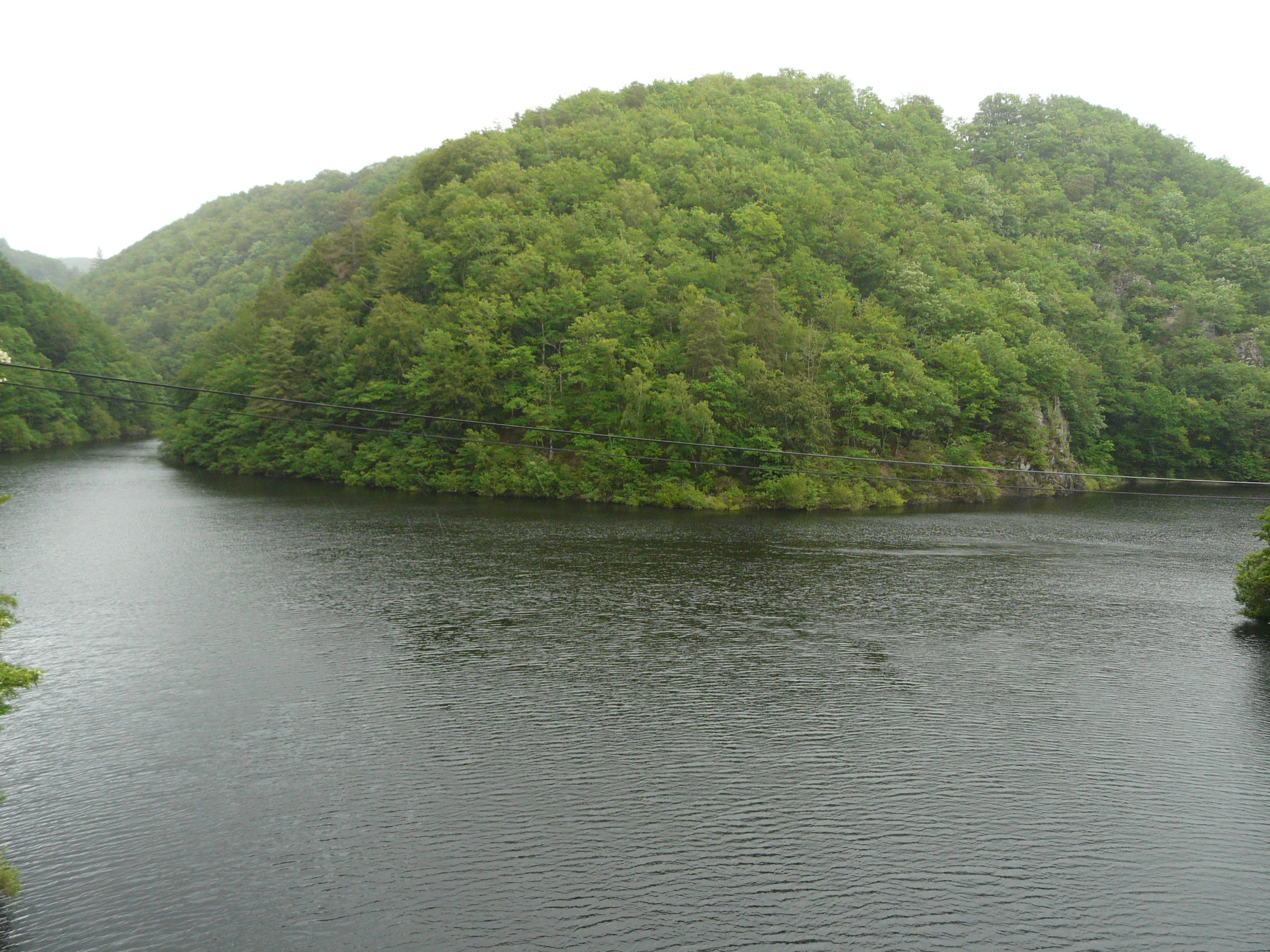

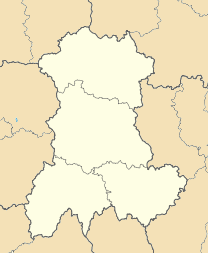
- Location within Auvergne
- Location: Auvergne, Limousin
- Coordinates: 45°26′54″N 02°28′57″E
- Type: artificial
- Primary outflows: Dordogne (river)
- Basin countries: France
- Max. length: 21 km (13 mi)
- Surface area: 10.72 km^{2} (4.14 sq mi)
- Max. depth: 30 m (98 ft)
- Surface elevation: 437 m (1,434 ft)

Lac de Bort-les-Orgues is a lake located on the border of the Cantal, Corrèze and Puy-de-Dôme departments, France. At an elevation of 437 m, its surface area is 10.72 km^{2}.
