= Analysis (disambiguation) =

Analysis is the process of observing and breaking down a complex topic or substance into smaller parts to gain a better understanding of it.

Analysis may also refer to:

- Analysis (journal), a major international journal of philosophy
- Analysis (radio programme), a half-hour BBC Radio 4 documentary programme
- Data analysis, the study of inspecting and modeling data to understand how it operates and why the data appears as it does
- Dimensional analysis, using information about the units of various quantities to gain information about an equation or inequality
- Market analysis, the study of the attractiveness and the dynamics of a market within an industry
- Mathematical analysis, a broad field of mathematics that rigorously studies the objects introduced by calculus
  - Complex analysis, the study of complex-valued functions of a single complex variable and the differentiation and integration thereof
  - Real analysis, the study of the behavior of real numbers, sequences and series of real numbers, and real functions
- Philosophical analysis
- Political feasibility analysis
- Psychoanalysis

== See also ==
- Analytical skill
- Analytic (disambiguation)
- Synthesis (disambiguation)
