= The Congress (2013 film) =

2013 film by Ari Folman

- French promotional poster
- Directed by: Ari Folman
- Screenplay by: Ari Folman
- Based on: The Futurological Congress by Stanisław Lem
- Produced by: Diana Elbaum; David Grumbach; Eitan Mansuri; Jeremiah Samuels
- Starring: Robin Wright
- Cinematography: Michal Englert
- Edited by: Nili Feller
- Music by: Max Richter
- Production company: Pandora Filmproduktion
- Distributed by: ARP Sélection (France); Cinéart (Belgium/Luxembourg); Pandora Film Verleih (Germany); Gutek Film (Poland)
- Release dates: 15 May 2013 (Cannes); 3 July 2013 (France)
- Running time: 123 minutes
- Countries: France; Israel; Belgium; Poland; Luxembourg; Germany
- Language: English
- Budget: €8 million
- Box office: $356,172

The Congress (French: Le Congrès, Hebrew: כנס העתידנים) is a 2013 English-language live-action/animated science-fiction drama film written and directed by Ari Folman, loosely based on Stanisław Lem's 1971 Polish science-fiction novel The Futurological Congress. It stars Robin Wright as a fictionalized version of herself who agrees to have a film studio use a digital clone of her in any film they want.

The film premiered at the 2013 Cannes Film Festival on 15 May 2013. Independent film distributor Drafthouse Films announced, along with Films We Like In Toronto, their co-acquisition of the North American rights to the film and a US theatrical and VOD/digital release planned for 2014.

== Plot ==
Robin Wright is an aging actress whose career suffered because of her erratic behavior and reputation for being fickle and unreliable. Her son, Aaron, suffers from Usher syndrome, which is slowly destroying his sight and hearing. Aided by Dr. Barker, Robin barely manages to stave off the worst effects of Aaron's decline, although his condition is sliding into its terminal stage.

Robin's longtime agent, Al, takes her to meet Jeff Green, the CEO of Miramount Studios, a film studio that offers to buy her likeness and digitize her into a computer-animated version of herself. Realizing that she may be unable to find future work with the emergence of this new technology, Robin agrees to do it for a hefty sum of money. The contract also requires that she never act again. After her body is digitally scanned, the studio can make films starring her, using only computer-generated characters.

Twenty years later, Robin travels to Abrahama City, where she will speak at the "Futurological Congress", Miramount's entertainment conference. Abrahama City is an animated, surreal utopia that is created from figments of people's imaginations, where anyone can become an animated avatar of themselves but must use hallucinogenic drugs to enter a mutable illusory state. In the decades since she was scanned, Robin's virtual persona has become the star of a popular film franchise, Rebel Robot Robin, making her and Tom Cruise the only remaining movie stars. While discussing her new contract with Jeff, Robin learns that Miramount developed a new technology that will allow anyone to devour her or possibly transform themselves into her with the hallucinogen. Robin agrees to the deal, but has a crisis of conscience, believing that no one should be turned into a product.

When asked to speak to the public at the Congress, Robin publicly voices her contrary views, upsetting everyone there before being taken by security guards. The Congress is then interrupted by rebels opposed to the technology industry. They seemingly assassinate the head of the Congress. During the attack, Robin is rescued by Dylan Truliner, who was Miramount's lead animator for her films. They escape, but she is soon captured by "Miramount Police". Robin is seemingly executed by Jeff as a punishment for rebelling against Miramount and the Congress. Robin is shown on a hospital bed while doctors discuss her case. One doctor reveals that Robin's execution was her hallucinating, that her rescuers were from Miramount. The doctors decide that Robin has become so intoxicated by the hallucinogen that she must be frozen until a treatment for her condition can be found.

Twenty years later, Robin is revived while still hallucinating an animated world. She reunites with Dylan, who says that the hallucinogenic technology is now widespread. People can take on whatever form they wish through it and as a result many negative aspects of humanity no longer exist. Dylan and Robin fall in love and take a journey through a colorful imaginary world. However, Robin is still desperate to return to the real world and be with Aaron. The only way to do that is by using a capsule that blocks all hallucinogenic effects. It is, in the animated world, equivalent to a suicide capsule. Dylan negotiated for one as part of his forced retirement package from Miramount, and he gives it to Robin.

Re-entering the real world, Robin finds herself in a dystopian environment. A tiny elite hovers over ruined cities in large airships. Most people have left for an existence in the animated world. Aaron did it only six months earlier when his condition left him virtually blind and deaf and he had given up hope of Robin's return. Because Aaron likely created a new identity for himself in the animated world, there is no way for anyone to find him.

Dr. Barker gives Robin an inhalation ampoule that will allow her to return to the animated world, though as her experiences have changed, her hallucinations will as well, and she will never be able to re-enter the same world she had left. Taking the drug, Robin sees Aaron's entire life flash before her eyes. She eventually discovers Aaron in the middle of an animated desert.

== Cast ==
- Robin Wright as Robin Wright, a fictionalized version of herself
- Paul Giamatti as Dr. Barker
- Jon Hamm as Dylan Truliner (voice)
- Danny Huston as Jeff Green
- Harvey Keitel as Al
- Kodi Smit-McPhee as Aaron Wright
- Sami Gayle as Sarah Wright
- Michael Stahl-David as Steve
- August Wittgenstein as Travis
- Jörg Vincent Malotki as Man In Zeppelin

== Relation to The Futurological Congress by Stanisław Lem ==
While some elements of the film were added by Ari Folman, others were based on the science-fiction novel The Futurological Congress by Stanisław Lem. Similarly, to Lem's Ijon Tichy, the actress is split between delusional and real mental states. In an early interview about the film, Folman said,

"There is certainly nothing based on Lem in the first part of the movie. The second part is definitely different, but I used Lem's The Futurological Congress more as a source of inspiration, rather than the basis of the screenplay."

Later, at the official website of the film in an interview, Folman says that the idea to put Lem's work to film came to him during his film school. He describes how he reconsidered Lem's allegory of communist dictatorship into a more current setting, namely, the dictatorship in the entertainment industry, and expresses his belief that he preserved the spirit of the book despite going far away from it.

== Production ==
The animation was created by Bridgit Folman Films Gang, based in Israel, who worked on the script for 19 years. Folman supervised six animation studios worldwide ("studio 352" in Luxemburg, "walking the dog" in Belgium, "bitteschoen" in Berlin, "studio Rakete" in Hamburg, "Studio Orange" in Poland, and "Snipple" in the Philippines). As in Waltz with Bashir, Folman worked with David Polonsky as the artistic director and Yoni Goodman as the animation director. Principal live-action filming was done in the United States and Germany from February to March 2011. Folman began working on the film in 2008, securing additional financing in 2011 from French bank Coficine-Natixis. The film was completed and released in 2013.

== Music ==
Max Richter, who had previously worked with Folman in Waltz with Bashir, created the soundtrack of The Congress. Many of the songs are composed by Richter himself, but the soundtrack also includes the Andante movement from Franz Schubert's Piano Trio No. 2, Frédéric Chopin's Nocturne Op.27-1 in C# minor, "Forever Young" from Bob Dylan, and Leonard Cohen's "If It Be Your Will". These last two songs were covered by Robin Wright.

Milan Entertainment, Inc. launched the soundtrack (in digital format) on 2 July 2013.

	Title	Duration
1.	Beginning and Ending	4:54
2.	Andante con moto from Trio in E-flat major, D.929	4:17
3.	Winterreise	2:09
4.	On the Road to Abrahama 1	4:14
5.	In Her Reflection	1:18
6.	On the Road to Abrahama 2	1:15
7.	All Your Joys, All Your Pain	4:52
8.	In the Cosmic Lobby	2:19
9.	Out of the Dark	5:03
10.	The Rebel Attack	3:14
11.	Still Dreaming, Still Travelling	1:30
12.	Forever Young	4:03
13.	Nocturne Op.27-1 in C♯ minor	1:15
14.	In the Garden of Cosmic Speculation	3:55
15.	Badass Agent Robin	1:03
16.	She Finds the Child	3:39
17.	If It Be Your Will	4:10
18.	Baby Escapo (Bonus Track)	5:22
19.	Charly's Song (Bonus Track)	3:04

== Reception ==
The Congress received positive reviews. On Rotten Tomatoes, it has a 73% approval rating, based on reviews from 109 critics, with an average rating of 6.70/10. The website's critical consensus states: "The Congress rises on the strength of Robin Wright's powerful performance, with enough ambitious storytelling and technical thrills to overcome its somewhat messy structure." On Metacritic, the film has a 63/100 rating based on reviews from 31 critics, signifying "generally favorable reviews".

Keith Uhlich of The A.V. Club named The Congress the sixth-best film of 2014, tying it with the re-release of Level Five.

In 2013, The Congress won the Best Animated Feature Film Award at the 26th European Film Awards.

Scout Tafoya gave the movie 3 1/2 stars in a 2014 review at RogerEbert.com, saying: "'The Congress' is a roll call of the orgiastic pleasures and bountiful comforts that art provides, and, a reminder of what waits for us when we leave the theater."

== Awards ==
The movie won the 26th European Film Awards for the best animated feature film in 2013, as well as the Directors' Fortnight in the Cannes Film Festival. That same year, it won the Sitges Film Festival's Critics Award, too. In 2013, it was also nominated for Best Animation Film in the Gijon Film Festival.

== Legacy ==
The film found renewed relevance a decade later, during the 2023 SAG-AFTRA strike. Several writers noted similarities between the movie and real life events, where SAG-AFTRA organizers claimed that the film studios had put forward an artificial intelligence proposal that would permit them to scan actors' bodies in exchange for a day's compensation and retain the rights to their image in perpetuity. Caryn James writing for the BBC in 2023 found the plot of The Congress to be "eerily prescient".
