= Analytic =

Analytic or analytical may refer to:

== Chemistry ==
- Analytical chemistry, the analysis of material samples to learn their chemical composition and structure
- Analytical technique, a method that is used to determine the concentration of a chemical compound or chemical element
- Analytical concentration

== Mathematics ==
- Abstract analytic number theory, the application of ideas and techniques from analytic number theory to other mathematical fields
- Analytic combinatorics, a branch of combinatorics that describes combinatorial classes using generating functions
- Analytic element method, a numerical method used to solve partial differential equations
- Analytic expression or analytic solution, a mathematical expression using well-known operations that lend themselves readily to calculation
- Analytic geometry, the study of geometry based on numerical coordinates rather than axioms
- Analytic number theory, a branch of number theory that uses methods from mathematical analysis

=== Mathematical analysis ===
- Analytic function, a function that is locally given by a convergent power series
- Analytic capacity, a number that denotes how big a certain bounded analytic function can become
- Analytic continuation, a technique to extend the domain of definition of a given analytic function
- Analytic manifold, a topological manifold with analytic transition maps
- Analytic variety, the set of common solutions of several equations involving analytic functions

=== Set theory ===
- Analytical hierarchy, an extension of the arithmetical hierarchy
- Analytic set, the continuous image of a Polish space

=== Proof theory ===
- Analytic proof, in structural proof theory, a proof whose structure is simple in a special way
- Analytic tableau, a tree structure used to analyze logical formulas

== Computer science ==
- Analytic or reductive grammar, a kind of formal grammar that works by successively reducing input strings to simpler forms
- Analytics, to find meaningful patterns in data

== Other science and technology ==
- Analytic signal, a particular representation of a signal
- Analytical mechanics, a refined, highly mathematical form of classical mechanics
- Analytical balance, a very high precision (0.1 mg or better) weighing scale

== Philosophy ==
- Analytic philosophy, a style of philosophy that came to dominate English-speaking countries in the 20th century
- Analytic proposition, a statement whose truth can be determined solely through analysis of its meaning
- Analytical Thomism, the movement to present the thought of Thomas Aquinas in the style of modern analytic philosophy
- Postanalytic philosophy, describes a detachment from the mainstream philosophical movement of analytic philosophy, which is the predominant school of thought in English-speaking countries

== Social sciences ==
=== Psychology ===
- Analytical psychology, part of the Jungian psychology movement
- Cognitive analytic therapy, a form of psychological therapy initially developed in the UK by Anthony Ryle
- Psychoanalysis, a set of psychological and psychotherapeutic theories and associated techniques

=== Sociology ===
- Analytic induction, the systematic examination of similarities between various social phenomena to develop concepts or ideas
- Analytic frame, a detailed sketch or outline of some social phenomenon, representing initial idea of a scientist analyzing this phenomenon

=== Politics ===
- Analytical Marxism, an interpretation of Marxism

=== Linguistics ===
- Analytic language, a natural language in which most morphemes are free (separate), instead of fused together

== Other areas ==
- Analytical jurisprudence, the use of analytical reasoning to study legal theory
- Analytic journalism, seeks to make sense of a complex reality in order to create public understanding
- Analytic cubism, one of two major branches of the cubism artistic movement
- Analytical skills

== See also ==
- Analytics (disambiguation)
- Analysis (disambiguation)
- Analytical Engine, a 19th-century mechanical general-purpose computer designed by Charles Babbage
- Analytical Society, a 19th-century British group who promoted the use of Leibnizian or analytical calculus, as opposed to Newtonian calculus
- Synthesis (disambiguation)
