= Man-made (disambiguation) =

Man-made refers to something that is artificial.

Man-made may also refer to:

- Anthropogenic hazard
- Man-made law
- Man-Made, an album by British alternative rock band Teenage Fanclub
- "Man Made", a song by A Flock of Seagulls on their album A Flock of Seagulls

== See also ==
- Artificial (disambiguation)
- Synthetic (disambiguation)
