= Crocodile (politics) =

Political nickname used in politics to describe corruption and greed

In politics, a crocodile is a nickname and metaphorical term or idiom that has been used in different countries to describe politicians and political groups. The image of the crocodile is often connected with qualities such as patience, cunning, resilience, or ruthlessness. In some contexts the term can be used as a compliment for a leader seen as strong and strategic, while in others it is a negative label linked to corruption, greed, or predatory behavior.

== Background ==
The crocodile has long been a powerful cultural symbol. It is often associated with danger and survival, as well as the ability to lie in wait before striking suddenly. In politics these traits are applied to describe leaders who are careful, deliberate, and willing to act decisively when an opportunity appears.

In English, the term comes from the phrase "crocodile tears", which is widely used to describe insincere and emotion, such as a hypocrite crying fake tears of grief, and has often been used in political commentary to accuse leaders of faking sympathy or grief. In Filipino, the word "buwaya" (lit. 'crocodile') is a common idiom for corrupt politicians or government officials. The term is frequently used in media, cartoons, and public protests to criticize those accused of taking advantage of public funds or engaging in bribery.

== Notable examples ==
One modern example of the crocodile metaphor is Emmerson Mnangagwa, the President of Zimbabwe. During the country's liberation struggle he became known as "Ngwena", meaning "crocodile" in Shona. The nickname reflected his reputation as a calculating fighter. In his later political career, the image followed him as he was seen as a shrewd and resilient operator within Zimbabwe's ruling ZANU–PF party. Mnangagwa’s allies within the party became known as the "Lacoste faction", a reference to the crocodile logo used by the French clothing brand. The name emphasized their loyalty to him and highlighted his long-standing image as "the Crocodile".

In Southeast Asia, and especially in the Philippines, the crocodile label has taken on a different meaning. Public officials accused of corruption are often mocked as "buwaya", or the "buwaya problem" suggesting greed and selfishness. Also the term frequently used as an insult for corrupt politicians and government officials, moneylenders, and the police. Cardinal Pablo Virgilio David has expressed dismay that a "spiritual crocodile" has been very active in the country, symbolizing corruption among politicians, district engineers, and contractors. The metaphor is deeply rooted in popular culture and has been used for decades as a shorthand for their behavioral and abusive.

Samar representative Edgar Mary Sarmiento filed House Bill No. 92, which seeks to bar all elective and appointive officials convicted of graft and corruption by the Sandiganbayan from holding any government position. Sarmiento explained that the measure supports the administration's goal of removing corrupt officials from the bureaucracy, arguing that current laws are too lenient since they allow convicted officials to remain in office despite corruption charges.

== See also ==
- Crocodile tears – a false, insincere display of emotion
- Epal (politics)
- Political metaphor
