= Superficiality =

Concept in social psychology

In social psychology, superficiality refers to a lack of depth in relationships, conversation and analysis. The principle of "superficiality versus depth" is said to have pervaded Western culture since at least the time of Plato. Social psychology considers that in everyday life, social processing veers between superficiality and a deeper form of processing.

== Historical sketch ==
Socrates sought to convince his debaters to turn from the superficiality of a worldview based on the acceptance of convention to the examined life of philosophy, founded (as Plato at least considered) upon the underlying Ideas. For more than two millennia, there was in the Platonic wake a general valorisation of critical thought over the superficial subjectivity that refused deep analysis. The salon style of the Précieuses might for a time affect superficiality, and play with the possibility of treating serious topics in a light-hearted fashion; but the prevailing western consensus firmly rejected elements such as everyday chatter or the changing vagaries of fashion as superficial distractions from a deeper reality.

== Modernist cross-currents ==
By contrast, Nietzsche opened the modernist era with a self-conscious praise of superficiality: "What is required is to stop courageously at the surface, the fold, the skin, to adore appearance, to believe in forms, tones, words, in the whole Olympus of appearance! Those Greeks were superficial – out of profundity!".

His (still) preference for superficiality was however overshadowed for most of the 20th century by modernism's full subscription to the depth/surface model, and to the privileging of the former over the latter. Frederic Jameson has highlighted four main modernist versions of the belief in a deeper reality - Marxist, psychoanalytic, existential, and semiotic - in each of which reality is understood to be concealed behind an inauthentic surface or façade. Jameson contrasts these models sharply with the lack of depth, the ahistoricity, the surface-focus and flatness of the postmodern consciousness, with its new cult of the image and the simulacrum.

== Postmodernism ==
In the last third of the 20th century, Lyotard began challenging the Platonic view of a true meaning hidden behind surface as a theatrical world-view, insisting instead that sense manifestations had their own reality which necessarily impacted upon the purely verbal order of intelligibility. Similarly, deconstruction has increasingly sought to undo the depth/surface hierarchy, proposing in ironic style that superficiality is as deep as depth. The result has been the call to abandon the idea that behind appearances there is any ultimate truth to be found; and in consequence the growing postmodern replacement of depth by surface, or by multiple surfaces.

That process of substitution was well under way by the 1990s,"when 'surface was depth' became a common view", and in the new millennium has led to a state of hypervisibility "where everything is public". In this new era of exposure a condition psychoanalyst Michael Parsons described as "the totalist world where there is a horror of inwardness; everything must be revealed".

If postmodernism's proponents welcomed the way a new transcendence of the surface/depth dichotomy allowed a fuller appreciation of the possibilities of the superficial - the surface consciousness of the now, as opposed to the depths of historical time - critics like J. G. Ballard object that the end-product is a world of "laws without penalties, events without significance, a sun without shadows": of surface without depth. They see postmodern superficiality as a by-product of the false consciousness of global capitalism, where surface distractions, news, and entertainment supersaturate the zapping mind in such a way as to foreclose the possibility of envisioning any critical alternative.

== Therapy ==
Almost all depth psychologies defy the postmodern to value depth over surface—to aim, in David Cooper's words, for "change from the depths of oneself upwards into the superficies of one's social appearance". Debates may rage over whether to begin analysis at the surface or by way of deep interpretations, but this is essentially a question of timing. Thus for example Jungians would highlight at the start of therapy what they call the persona-restoring phase as an effort to preserve superficiality, but would later optimally see the client moving from the surface to deeper emotion and creativity.

Fritz Perls by contrast maintained that "the simplicity of the Gestalt approach is that we pay attention to the obvious, to the utmost surface. We don't delve into a region which we don't know anything about, into the so-called 'unconscious'". A similar focus on the superficial has fuelled much of the Freud Wars of late modernity, in which, according to Jonathan Lear, "the real object of attack—for which Freud is only a stalking-horse—is the very idea that humans have unconscious motivation". Given a choice of surface or depth—"are we to see humans as having depth, layers of meaning which lie beneath the surface of their own understanding?"—he asks: "Or are we to take ourselves as transparent to ourselves...to ignore the complexity, depth and darkness of human life"; the postmodern bias remains towards superficiality.

== Social processing ==
Social psychology considers that in everyday life social processing veers between superficiality, where we rely on first impressions and immediate judgements, and a deeper form of processing in which we seek to understand the other person more fully. In the ordinary course of life, we necessarily take others at face-value, and use ideal types/stereotypes to guide our daily activities; while institutions too can rely on the superficial consensus of groupthink to preclude deeper investigation.

Some circumstances however necessitate a shift from superficial to extensive processing. When things become serious, we must put more and deeper thought into understanding, leaving superficial judgements to cases where the stakes are low, not high.

== In the media ==
- Entertainer Bill Hicks often criticized consumerism, superficiality, mediocrity, and banality within the media and popular culture, describing them as oppressive tools of the ruling class, meant to "keep people stupid and apathetic."
- Web 2.0 in particular is often seen as specifically fostering superficiality, replacing deep, measured analysis by noisy but unfiltered observation.
- Aldous Huxley's novel After Many a Summer is his examination of American culture, particularly what he saw as its narcissism, superficiality, and obsession with youth. Freud had similarly explored what was at the start of the 20th century a conventional contrast between the (historical) depth of Europe and the superficiality of America; but towards the century's close, another European, Baudrillard, would return to the image of America as a shallow, cultureless desert, only to praise it in postmodern terms "because you are delivered from all depths there – a brilliant, mobile, superficial neutrality".
- Pride and Prejudice has been analysed in terms of the movement from the superficiality of Elizabeth Bennet's initially favourable appraisal of Whickham – her first impressions – to her deeper realisation of the value of Mr Darcy.

== See also ==
- Acedia
- Blunted affect
- Celebrity culture
- Chic
- Dumbing down
- Emotional intelligence
- Ersatz
- Hyperreality
- Imaginary order
- One-Dimensional Man
- Platitude
- Sheeple
- Silliness
- Superficial
- Superficial charm
- Superficial sympathy
