= Synthesizer (disambiguation) =

A synthesizer or synthesiser is a collection of electronic devices that modify or manipulate an electronically generated musical tone or sound source.

Synthesizer or synthesiser may also refer to:

- Frequency synthesizer, an electronic system for generating any of a range of frequencies from a single fixed timebase or oscillator
- Video synthesizer, a device that electronically creates a video signal
- Speech synthesizer, an electronic device or computer program that produces human-like speech
- Synthesizer, a 2007 album by Information Society
- "Synthesizer", a 1998 song by Outkast from Aquemini
- "Synthesizer", a 2003 song by Electric Six from Fire
- "Synthesizer", a 2010 song by Mike Posner from 31 Minutes to Takeoff

== See also ==
- Synth (disambiguation)
- Synthesis (disambiguation)
- Synthesizer Patel, a character in Look Around You played by Sanjeev Kohli
