= 29th Boston Society of Film Critics Awards =

2008 film awards

29th BSFC Awards

December 14, 2008

Best Film (TIE):
Slumdog Millionaire
and
WALL-E

The 29th Boston Society of Film Critics Awards, honoring the best in filmmaking in 2008, were given on December 14, 2008.

== Winners ==
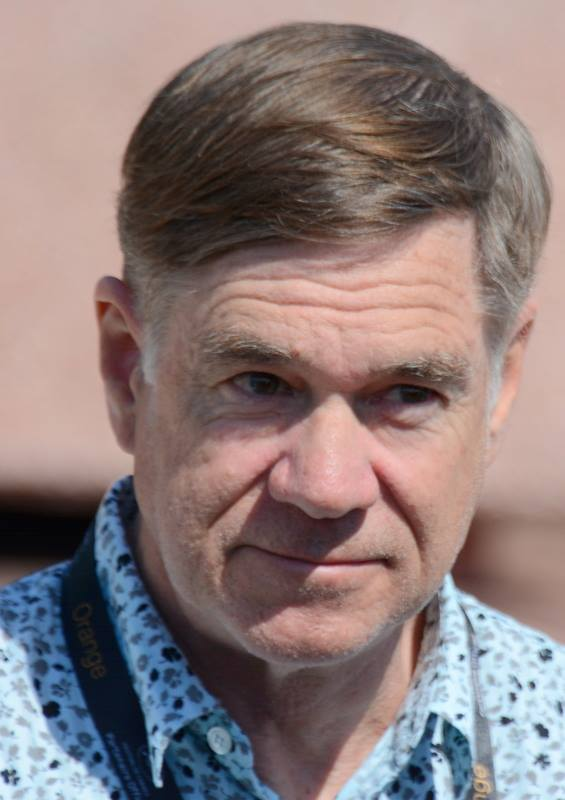
Gus Van Sant, Best Director winner

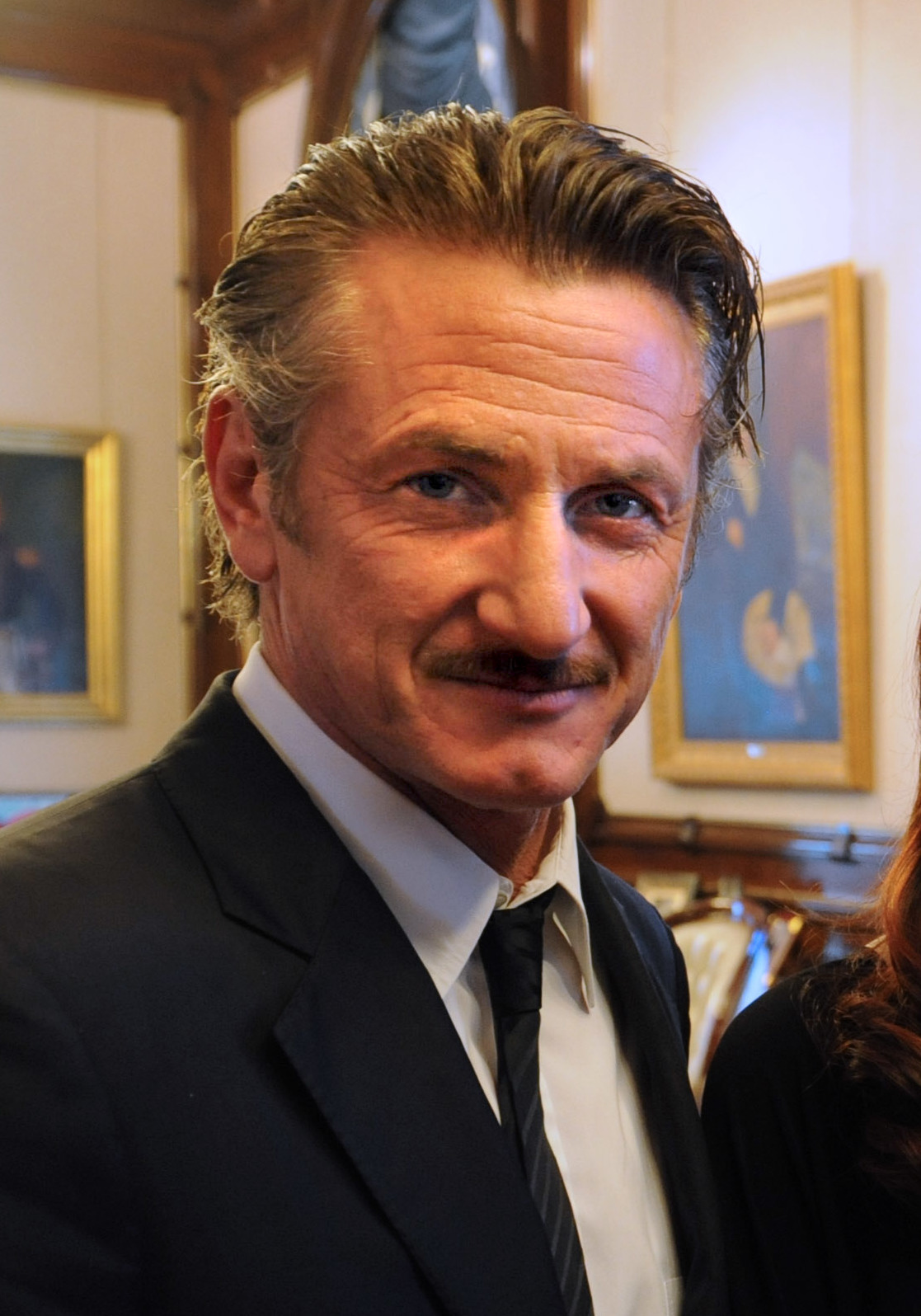
Sean Penn, Best Actor co-winner

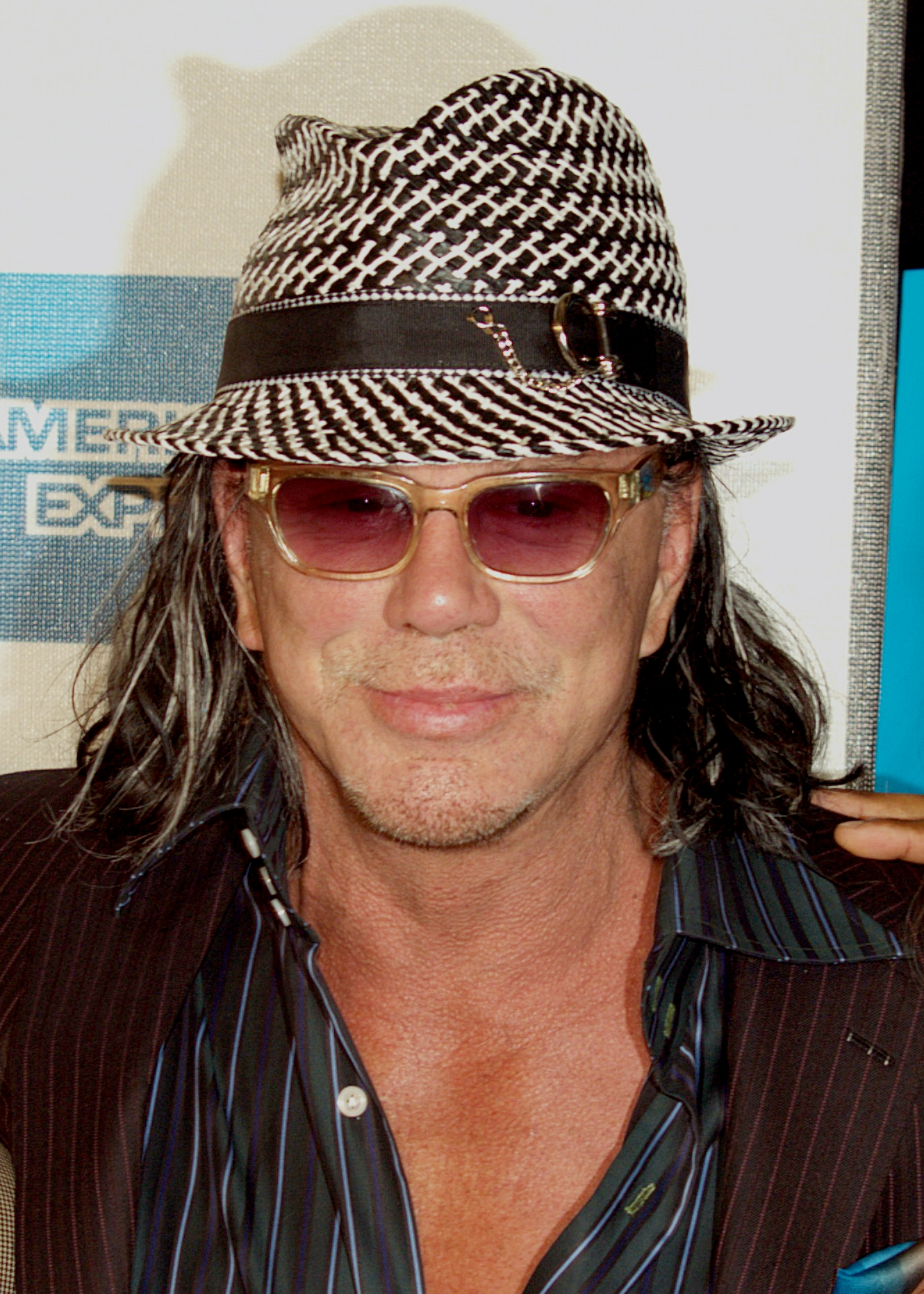
Mickey Rourke, Best Actor co-winner

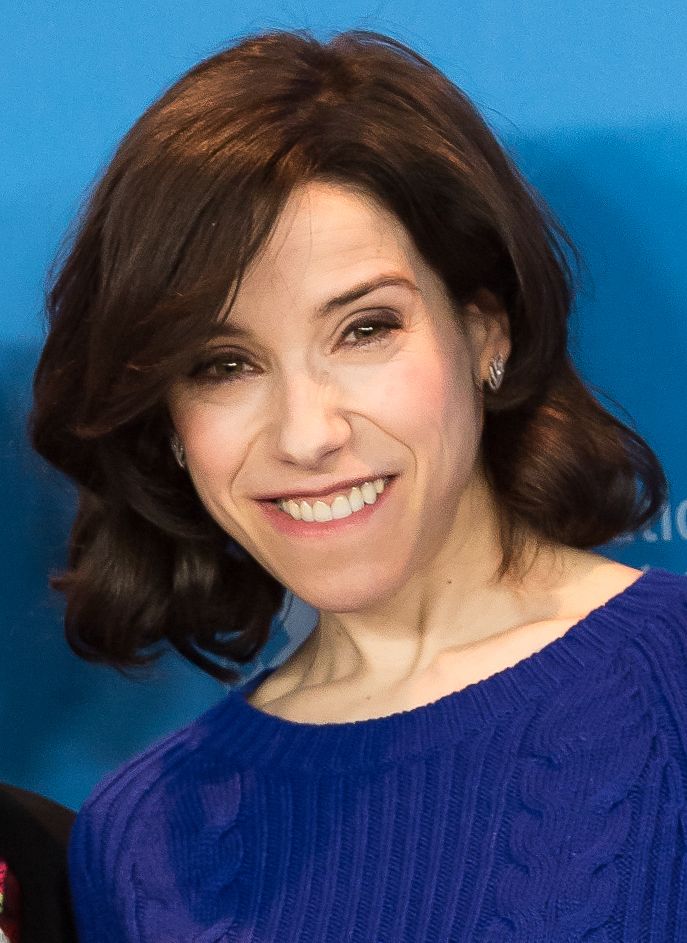
Sally Hawkins, Best Actress winner

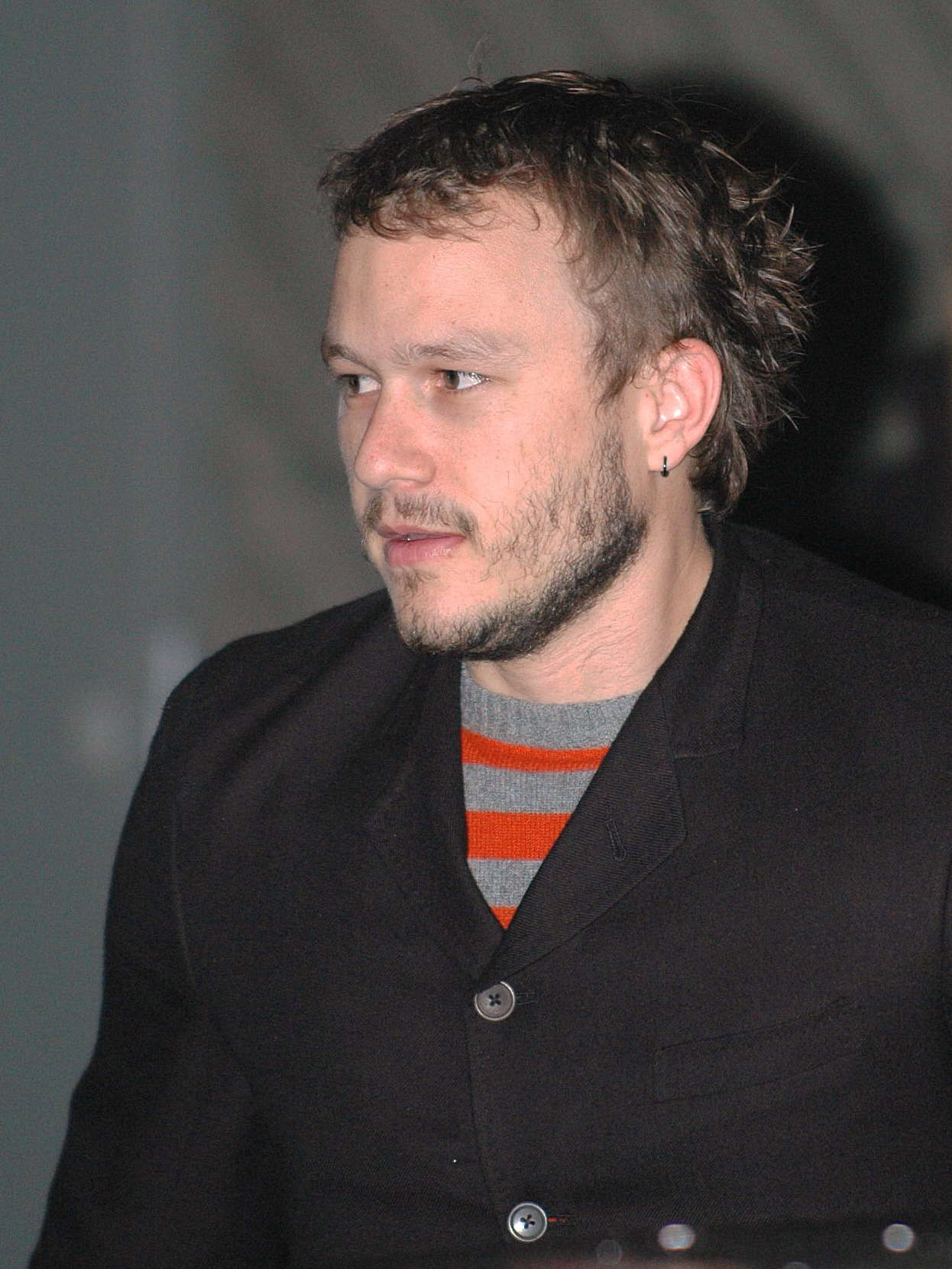
Heath Ledger, Best Supporting Actor winner

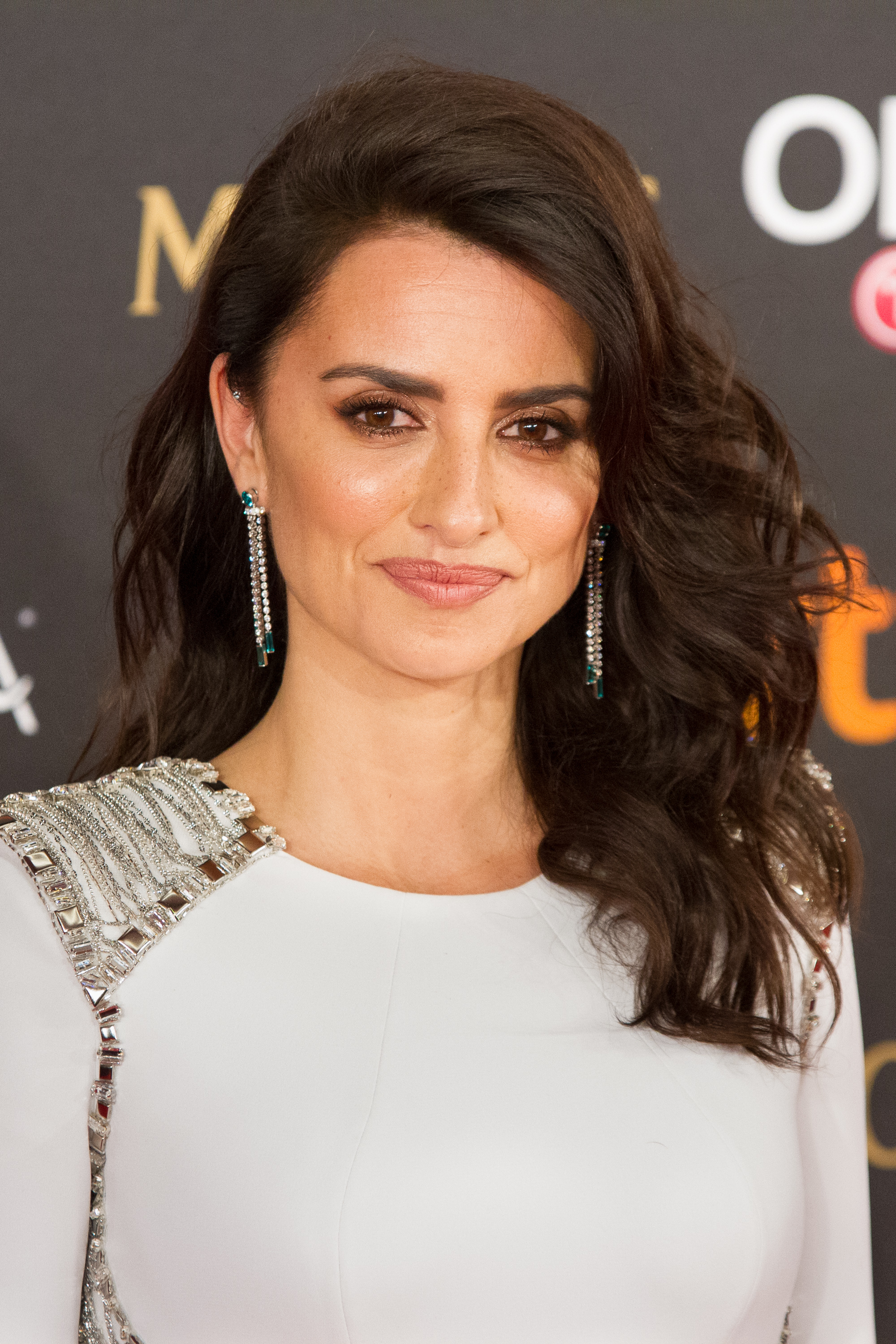
Penélope Cruz, Best Supporting Actress winner

- Best Film (TIE):
  - Slumdog Millionaire
  - WALL-E
  - Runner-up: Milk
- Best Actor (TIE):
  - Sean Penn – Milk
  - Mickey Rourke – The Wrestler
  - Runner-up (TIE): Richard Jenkins – The Visitor and Frank Langella – Frost/Nixon
- Best Actress:
  - Sally Hawkins – Happy-Go-Lucky
  - Runner-up: Anne Hathaway – Rachel Getting Married
- Best Supporting Actor:
  - Heath Ledger – The Dark Knight
  - Runner-up: Robert Downey Jr. – Tropic Thunder
- Best Supporting Actress:
  - Penélope Cruz – Vicky Cristina Barcelona
  - Runner-up: Viola Davis – Doubt
- Best Director:
  - Gus Van Sant – Milk and Paranoid Park
- Best Screenplay:
  - Dustin Lance Black – Milk
  - Runner-up: Mike Leigh – Happy-Go-Lucky
- Best Cinematography:
  - Christopher Doyle and Rain Kathy Li – Paranoid Park
  - Runner-up: Anthony Dod Mantle – Slumdog Millionaire
- Best Documentary:
  - Man on Wire
  - Runner-up: Young @ Heart
- Best Foreign-Language Film:
  - Let the Right One In (Låt den rätte komma in) • Sweden
  - Runner-up: Waltz with Bashir (Vals Im Bashir) • Israel
- Best Animated Film:
  - WALL-E
  - Runner-up: Waltz with Bashir (Vals Im Bashir)
- Best Editing:
  - Chris Dickens – Slumdog Millionaire
- Best New Filmmaker:
  - Martin McDonagh – In Bruges
- Best Ensemble Cast:
  - Tropic Thunder
  - Runner-up: The Visitor
