= Crocodile tears =

False, insincere display of emotion

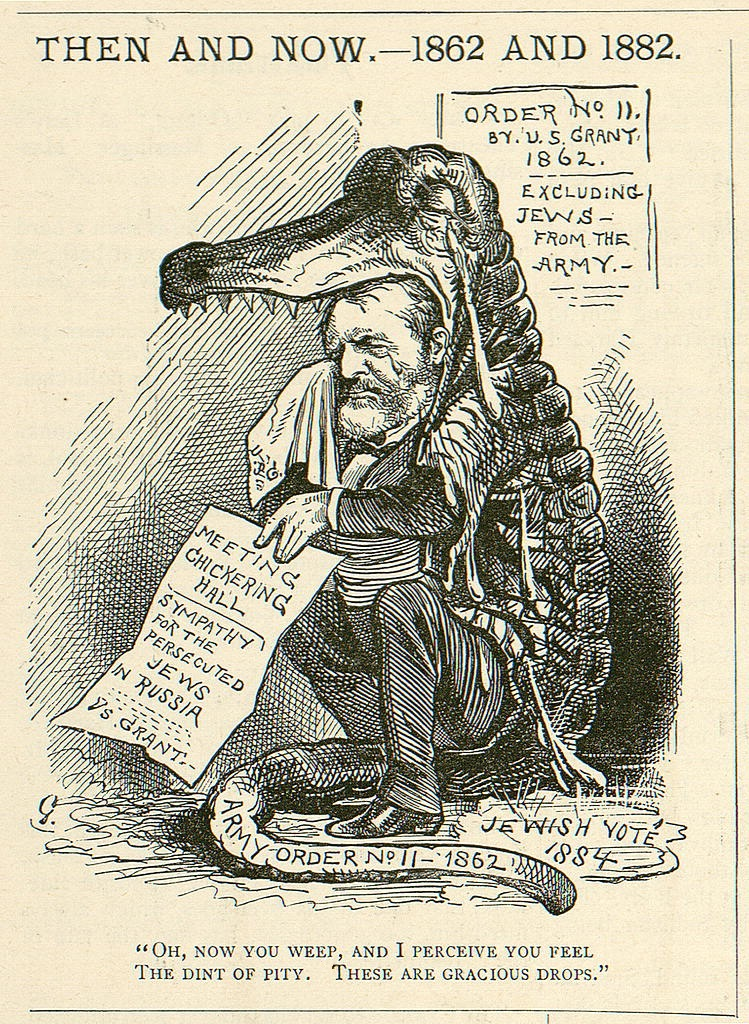
A 1882 cartoon by Bernhard Gillam depicting Ulysses S. Grant courting Jewish voters by crying "crocodile tears" over the persecution of Jews in Russia. The cartoon contrasts Grant's expressions of outrage with his own earlier military order to expel Jews from within his lines. He received a majority of the Jewish vote in the 1868 presidential election and went on to place a record number of Jewish people into high office up to that point in time.

Crocodile tears, or superficial sympathy, is a colloquial term used to describe a false, insincere display of emotion, such as a hypocrite crying fake tears of grief. The phrase derives from an ancient belief that crocodiles shed tears while consuming their prey and, as such, is present in many modern languages, especially in Europe, where it was introduced through Latin. While crocodiles do have tear ducts, they weep to lubricate their eyes, typically when they have been out of water for a long time and their eyes begin to dry out. However, evidence suggests this could also be triggered by feeding.

Bogorad's syndrome, a condition which causes sufferers to shed tears while consuming food, has been labelled "crocodile tears syndrome" in reference to the legend.

== History and usage ==
The expression comes from an ancient anecdote that crocodiles weep for the victims they are eating. A collection of proverbs attributed to Plutarch suggests that the phrase "crocodile tears" was well known in antiquity: comparing the crocodile's behaviour to people who desire or cause the death of someone, but then publicly lament for them. The story is given a Christian gloss in the Bibliotheca by early medieval theologian Photios. Photios uses the story to illustrate the Christian concept of repentance. The story is repeated in bestiaries such as De bestiis et aliis rebus.

This tale was first spread widely in English in the stories of the travels of Sir John Mandeville in the 14th century.

In that country and by all Inde be great plenty of cockodrills, that is a manner of a long serpent, as I have said before. And in the night they dwell in the water, and on the day upon the land, in rocks and in caves. And they eat no meat in all the winter, but they lie as in a dream, as do the serpents. These serpents slay men, and they eat them weeping; and when they eat they move the over jaw, and not the nether jaw, and they have no tongue.

— Curious creatures in zoology

A later writer, Edward Topsell, provided a different explanation for the tears, saying, "There are not many brute beasts that can weep, but such is the nature of the crocodile that, to get a man within his danger, he will sob, sigh, and weep as though he were in extremity, but suddenly he destroyeth him." In this version, the crocodile pretends to be in distress to lure prey into a false sense of security. However, Topsell also refers to the older story that crocodiles wept during and after eating a man, repeating the standard Christian moral that this signified a kind of fake repentance like Judas weeping after betraying Jesus.

=== In literature ===
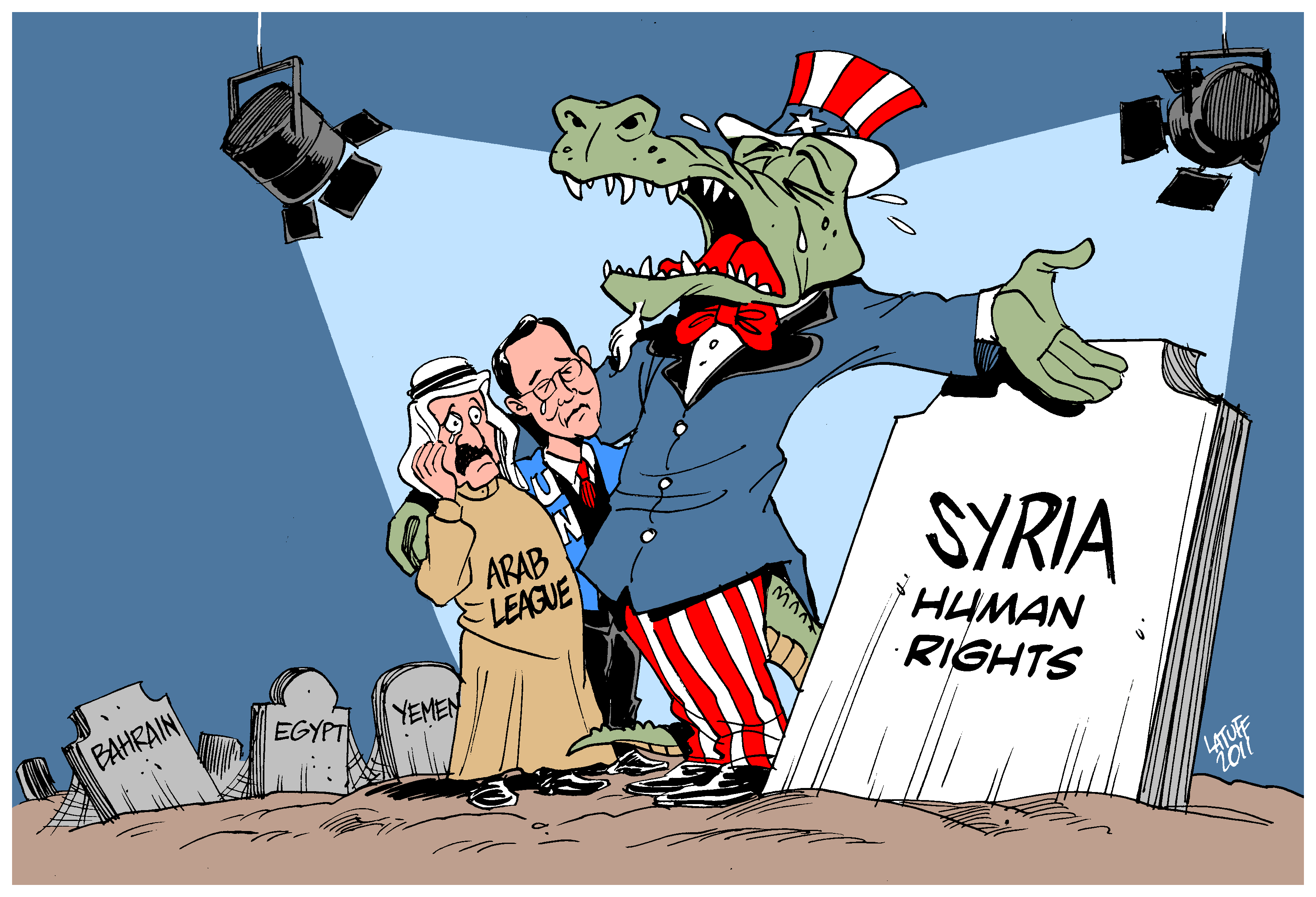
"Crocodile tears for Syria", cartoon by Carlos Latuff illustrating the concept

Shakespeare regularly refers to the concept. He uses both of Topsell's versions of the motive, as a trick and as fake repentance. A prominent example is in Othello, Act IV, Scene i, in which Othello convinces himself that his wife is cheating on him.

If that the earth could teem with woman's tears,
Each drop she falls would prove a crocodile.

He also refers to the version about tricking prey in Henry VI, Part 2, Act III, Scene i, in which a character refers to the faked emotions of the Duke of Gloucester: "Gloucester's show / Beguiles him, as the mournful crocodile / With sorrow, snares relenting passengers." In Antony and Cleopatra, Act II, Scene vii, Mark Antony chides Lepidus, who has asked him what crocodiles are like, with a meaningless description ending with the words "And the tears of it are wet".

Shakespeare's contemporary Edmund Spenser also refers to the story in The Faerie Queene, writing of the "cruel crafty" creature "which, in false grief, hiding his harmful guile / Doth weep full sore, and sheddeth tender tears.

In Henry Purcell's 1688 opera Dido and Aeneas, (librettist Nahum Tate), when Aeneas tells Dido he must abandon her to found Rome on the Italian Peninsula, she proclaims, "Thus on the fatal banks of Nile, / Weeps the deceitful crocodile."

== Actual crocodile behaviour ==
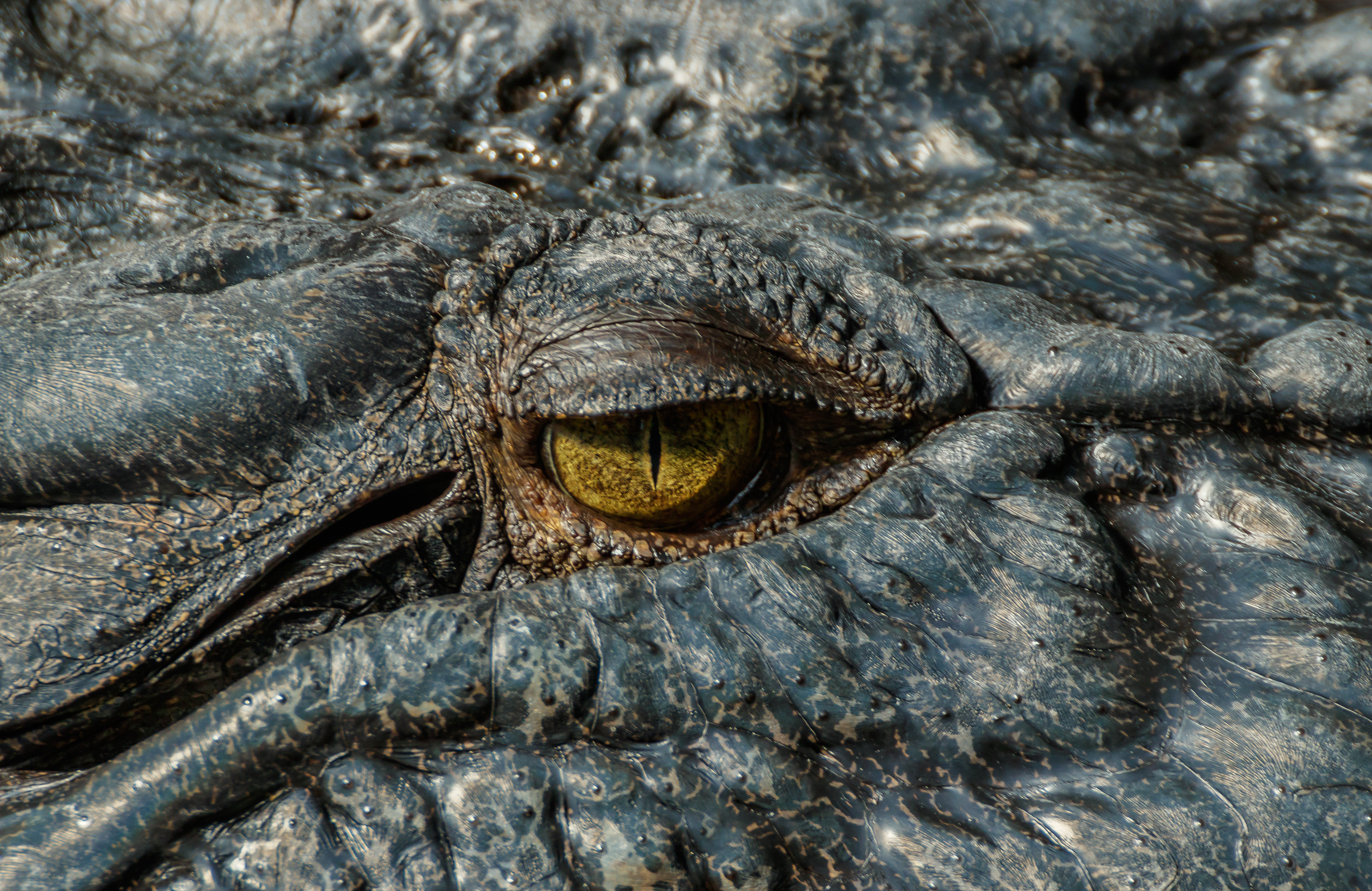
An eye of a saltwater crocodile

While crocodiles can and do generate tears, the tears are not linked to emotion. The fluid from their tear ducts functions to clean and lubricate the eye, and is most prominent and visible when crocodiles have been on dry land for a while. In the case of American crocodiles and saltwater crocodiles, the tears help to remove the excess salt that they take in with their food. According to Adam Britton,

It is difficult to trace the origin of this particular myth, but it's easy to see why it has become so popular – for an apparently remorseless creature such as a crocodile to actually weep over its victims is a memorable irony which has inspired considerable prose and created a phrase which is still popular today.

In 2006, neurologist Malcolm Shaner, assisted by Kent Vliet, a researcher at the University of Florida, decided to test the story that crocodiles, or their close relatives alligators and caimans, were likely to "weep" while feeding. Studying animals in Florida's St. Augustine Alligator Farm Zoological Park, Vliet recorded seven caimans feeding. He chose to use caimans rather than crocodiles because at the sanctuary they could be observed feeding on dry land. Five of the seven animals were seen "weeping", leading to the conclusion that the story describes a real phenomenon. The researchers suggest that the "weeping" may be caused by the hissing of warm air during feeding, which is forced through the sinuses, stimulating the animals' tear glands into emptying fluid into the eye.

== Bogorad's syndrome ==
The phrase gives its name to Bogorad's syndrome, colloquially "crocodile tears syndrome", an uncommon consequence of recovery from Bell's palsy where faulty regeneration of the facial nerve causes sufferers to shed tears while eating. Russian neuropathologist F. A. Bogorad, who first described the condition in 1926, did so in an article entitled "syndrome of the crocodile tears" (also translated as "the symptom of crocodile tears"). Bogorad argued that the tears were caused by the act of salivation.

== See also ==
- Crocodile (politics)
- DARVO
- Shooting and crying
- Superficiality
