= 2008 Los Angeles Film Critics Association Awards =

Annual US film awards ceremony

34th LAFCA Awards
- Date: December 9, 2008

Highlights
- Best Picture: WALL-E

The 34th Los Angeles Film Critics Association Awards, given by the Los Angeles Film Critics Association (LAFCA), honored the best in film for 2008. Pixar's animated film WALL-E won the Best Film award and became the first-ever animated film to do so; however, the film lost the Best Animated Film award to Waltz with Bashir.

== Winners ==
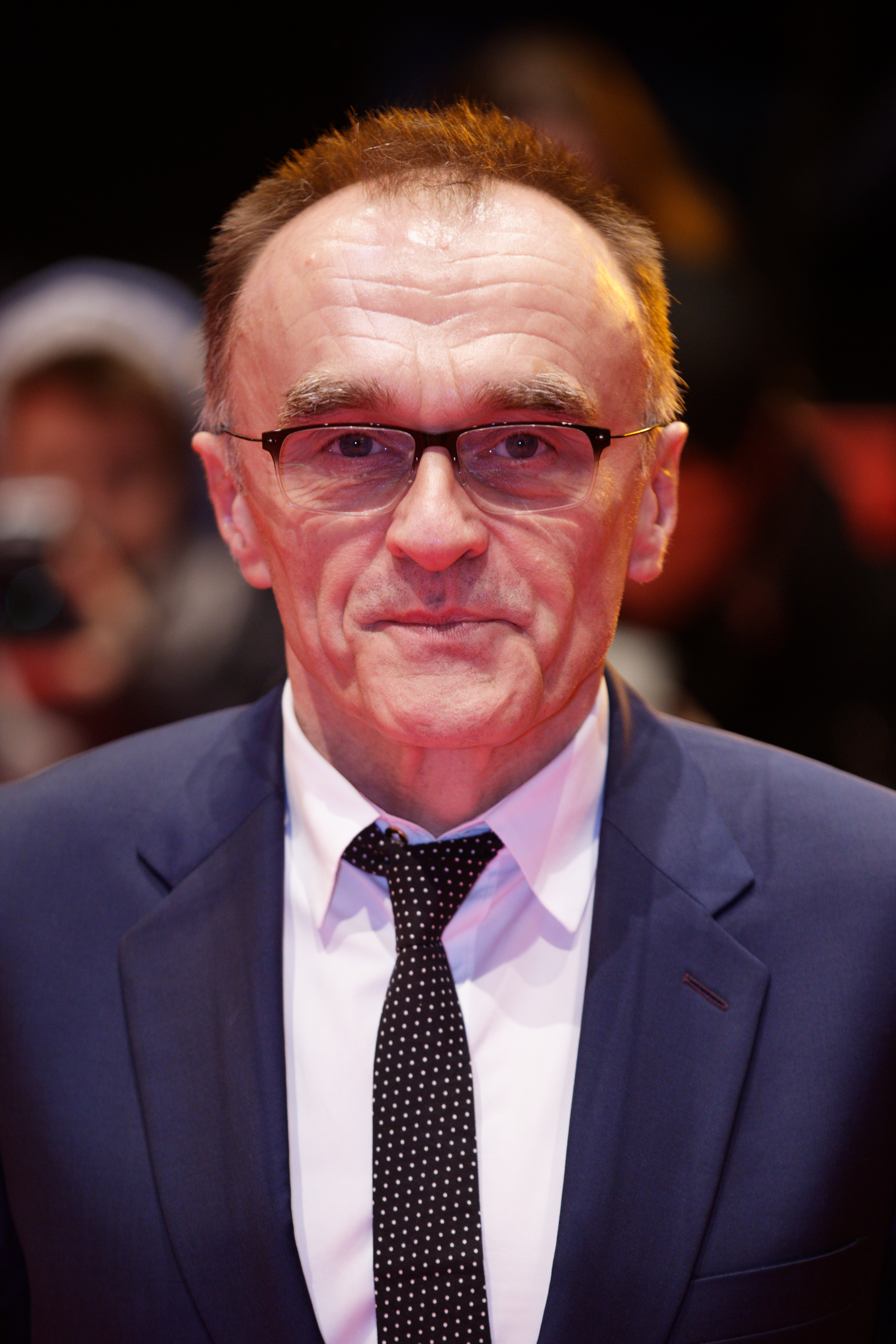
Danny Boyle, Best Director winner

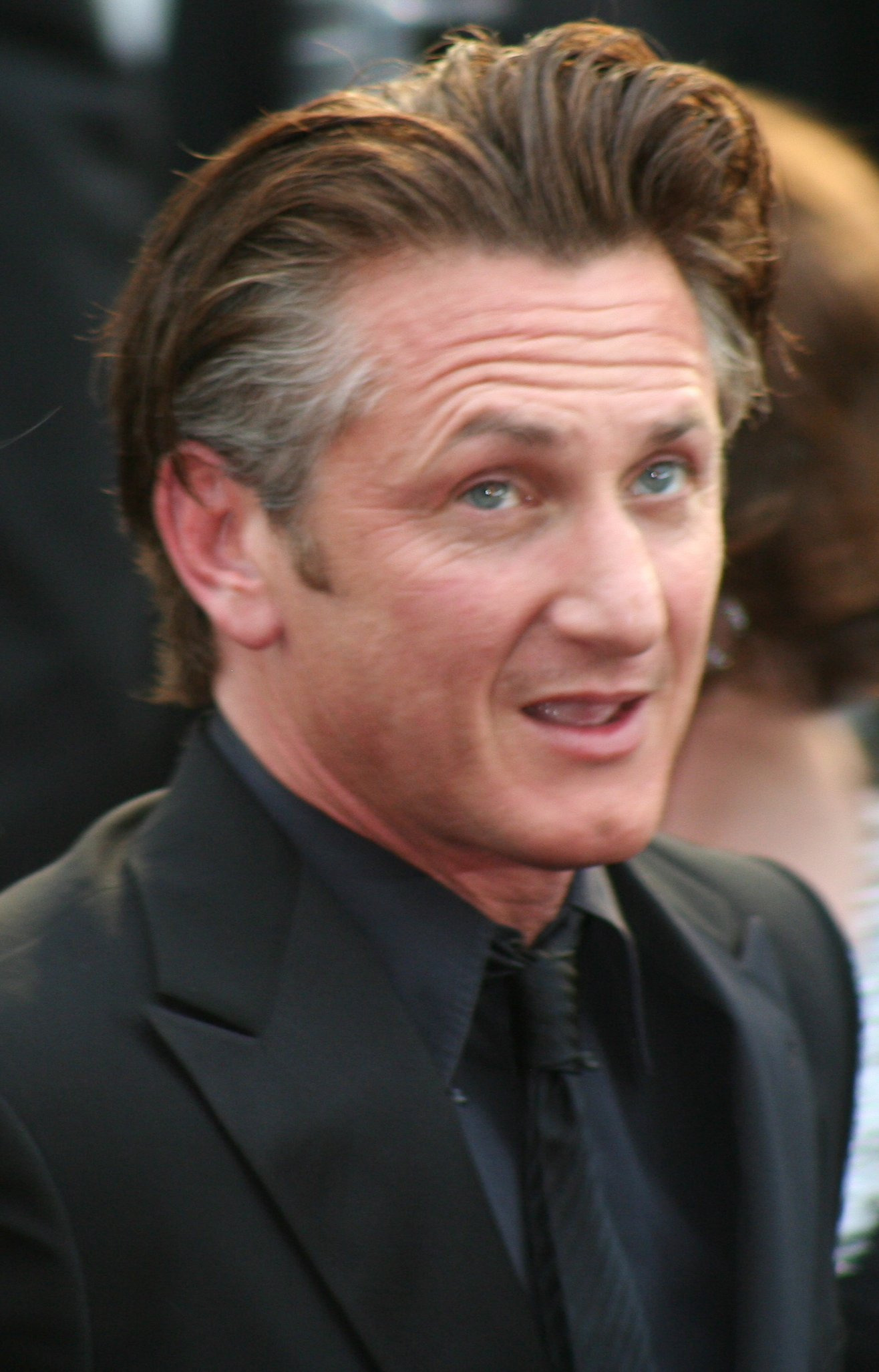
Sean Penn, Best Actor winner

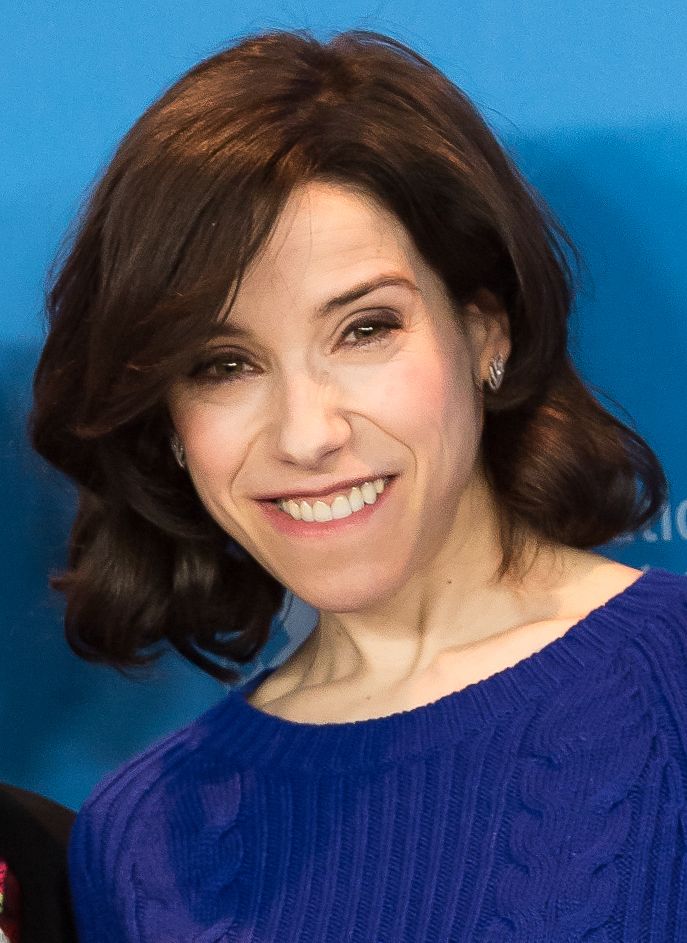
Sally Hawkins, Best Actress winner

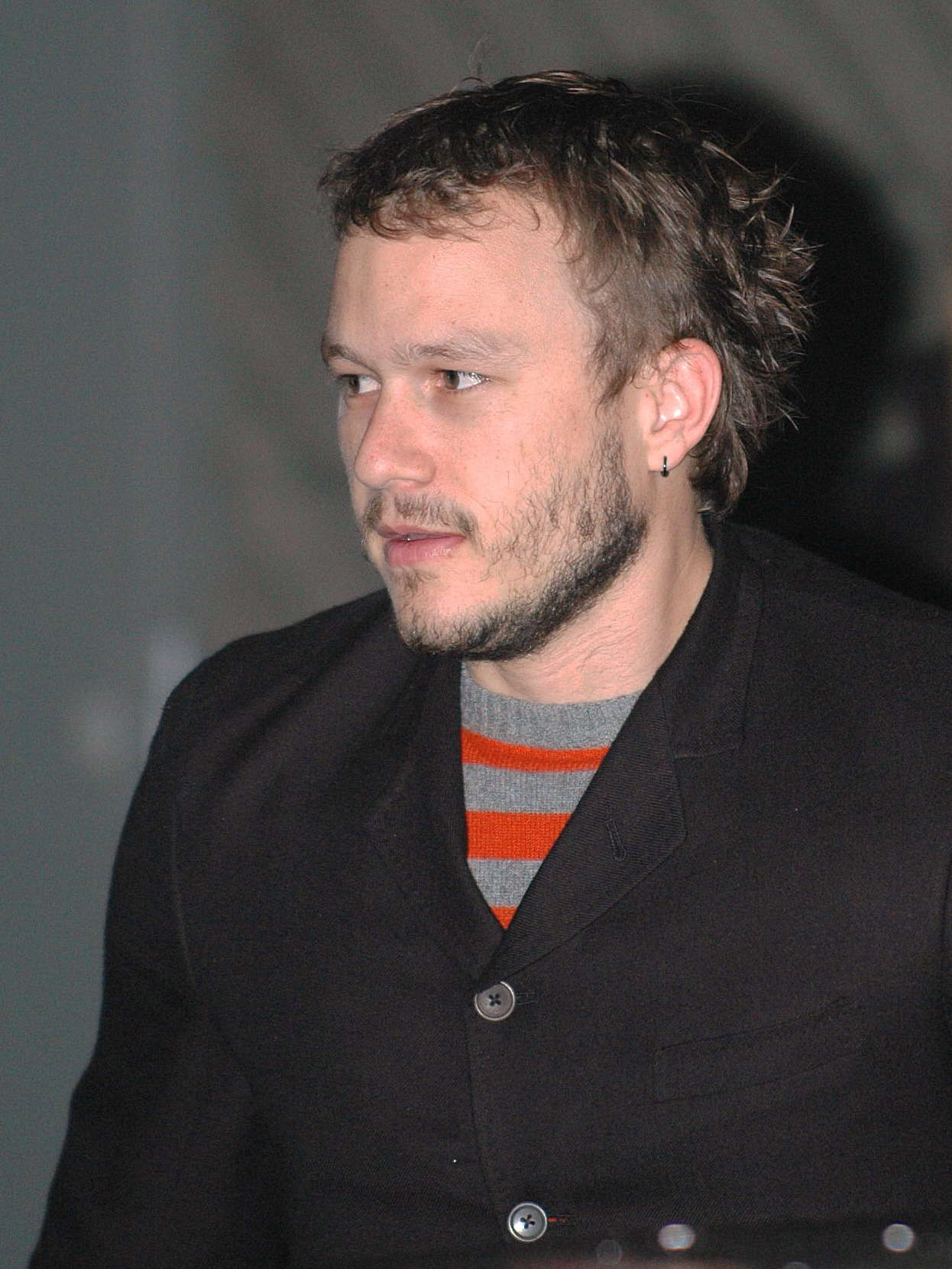
Heath Ledger, Best Supporting Actor winner

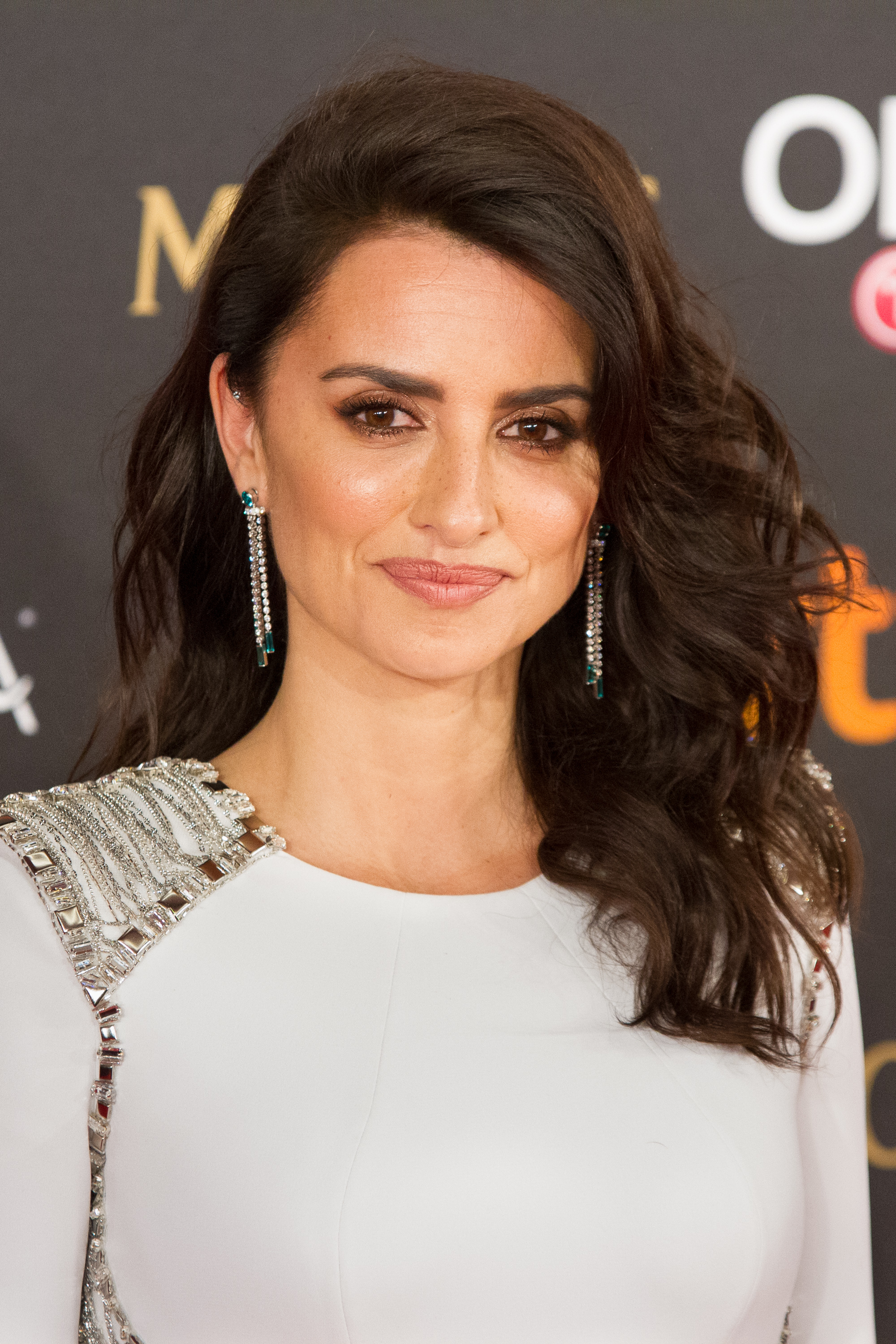
Penélope Cruz, Best Supporting Actress winner

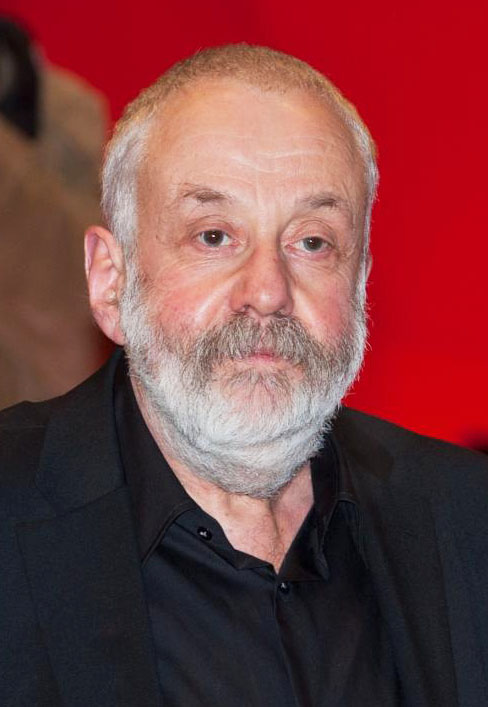
Mike Leigh, Best Screenplay winner

- Best Picture:
  - WALL-E
  - Runner-up: The Dark Knight
- Best Director:
  - Danny Boyle – Slumdog Millionaire
  - Runner-up: Christopher Nolan – The Dark Knight
- Best Actor:
  - Sean Penn – Milk
  - Runner-up: Mickey Rourke – The Wrestler
- Best Actress:
  - Sally Hawkins – Happy-Go-Lucky
  - Runner-up: Melissa Leo – Frozen River
- Best Supporting Actor:
  - Heath Ledger – The Dark Knight (posthumously)
  - Runner-up: Eddie Marsan – Happy-Go-Lucky
- Best Supporting Actress:
  - Penélope Cruz – Elegy and Vicky Cristina Barcelona
  - Runner-up: Viola Davis – Doubt
- Best Screenplay:
  - Mike Leigh – Happy-Go-Lucky
  - Runner-up: Charlie Kaufman – Synecdoche, New York
- Best Cinematography:
  - Yu Lik-wai – Still Life (Sanxia haoren)
  - Runner-up: Anthony Dod Mantle – Slumdog Millionaire
- Best Production Design:
  - Mark Friedberg – Synecdoche, New York
  - Runner-up: Nathan Crowley – The Dark Knight
- Best Music Score:
  - A. R. Rahman – Slumdog Millionaire
  - Runner-up: Alexandre Desplat – The Curious Case of Benjamin Button
- Best Foreign-Language Film:
  - Still Life (Sanxia haoren) – China/Hong Kong
  - Runner-up: The Class (Entre les murs) – France
- Best Documentary/Non-Fiction Film:
  - Man on Wire
  - Runner-up: Waltz with Bashir (Vals im Bashir)
- Best Animation:
  - Waltz with Bashir (Vals im Bashir)
- The Douglas Edwards Experimental/Independent Film/Video Award:
  - James Benning – RR and Casting a Glance
- New Generation Award:
  - Steve McQueen – Hunger
