= David Polonsky =

Israeli book illustrator and artistic film director

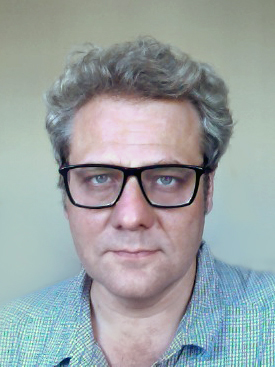
David Polonsky

David Polonsky (Hebrew: דוד פולונסקי; born 1973) is an Israeli book illustrator and artistic film director.

== Career ==
His illustrations appeared in all major Israeli magazines and newspapers and illustrated many children's books, for which he received multiple awards. He also directed children's animated TV films. He taught illustration at the Bezalel Academy of Arts and Design.

In 2018, he illustrated Ari Folman's graphic novel adaptation of Anne Frank's diary. That same year, an English-language translation of The Heart-Shaped Leaf (written by Shira Geffen and illustrated by Polonsky) was published by Green Bean Books.

== Filmography ==
- 2008: Waltz with Bashir, animated war documentary; made into a graphic novel by Folman and Polonsky
- 2013: The Congress
- 2021: Legend of Destruction

== Awards ==
- 2004 Ben-Yitzhak Prize of the Israel Museum for Children's Books Illustration, Israel Museum, Jerusalem
- 2008 The Excellence Award of the Bezalel Academy of Art and Design in Jerusalem
- 2008 Ben-Yitzhak Prize of the Israel Museum for Children's Books Illustration, Israel Museum, Jerusalem
- 2008 The Ophir Prize of the Israeli Academy of Film and Television for artistic direction, for Waltz with Bashir
- 2008 Award for Decorations, Cinema Eye Honors, for Waltz with Bashir
- 2012 Andersen Prize for the Illustration of Children's Books, International Board on Books for Young People (IBBY), Basel, Switzerland.
