= Yoni Goodman =

Israeli animator (born 1976)

- יוני גודמן
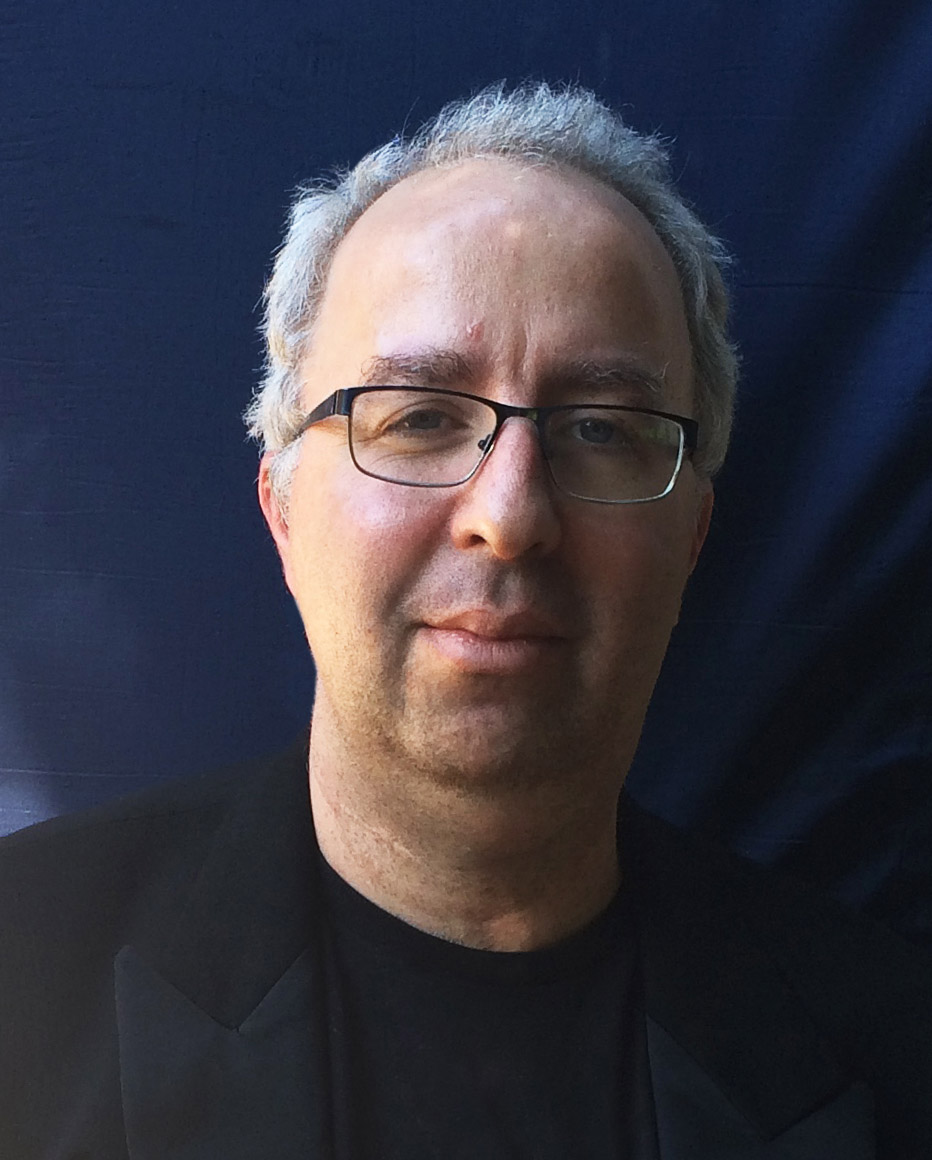
- Born: 1976 (age 49–50)
- Occupations: Animator, Animation director, Illustrator, Graphic designer
- Website: http://www.yonigoodman.co.il/ Blog- Dailymation

Yoni Goodman (Hebrew: יוני גודמן; born 1976) is an Israeli animator.

== Biography ==
Goodman began his career as an illustrator and graphic designer, working for two of Israel's major newspapers, Maariv and Haaretz. In 1998, he studied at the department of visual communication in Bezalel Academy of Arts and Design, Jerusalem, majoring in animation. After his graduation in 2002, Yoni worked as a freelance animator and illustrator, working on commercials, short films and clips, as well as teaching animation in the Bezalel Academy of Arts and Design.

In 2004, Yoni worked as an animation director for Ari Folman's documentary series The material that love is made of. Folman and Goodman's collaboration continued with Yoni as an animation director in Ari Folman's acclaimed film Waltz with Bashir. Goodman also developed the Adobe Flash Cutout technique for the film.

In 2009, he made several short films for human rights organizations, notably the short film Closed Zone, protesting against the Gaza blockade. Yoni also worked as an animation director in the short film The Gift, directed by Ari Mark.

In 2011 Yoni began his work as Animation Director for Ari Folman's feature The Congress (2013), based on a novel by Stanislaw Lem.

He also collaborated on a Global Health Media project about Healthcare literacy, notably on

- cholera
- ebola
- coronavirus

Yoni Goodman currently lives in Israel with his wife and 3 children.

== Filmography ==
- Waltz with Bashir (2008, animation director)
- Closed Zone (2009, director)
- The Gift (2010, animator)(short film)
- "The Story of Cholera" (2011, director)(short film)
- The Congress (2013)
- Where Is Anne Frank (2021)
- "The Story of Ebola"
- "The Story of Coronavirus"
- "The Story of Sugar"

== Awards ==
Won

- San Antonio Film Festival - Best Animated short - Closed Zone (2010)
- Cinema Eye Honors - Best Animation - Waltz with Bashir (2008)

Nominated

- Ophir Award - Best Cinematography - Waltz with Bashir (2008)
- Visual Effects Society Awards - Outstanding Animation in an Animated Motion Picture - Waltz with Bashir (2008)
- Norwich Film Festival - Official Selection - Closed Zone (2009)
