= Perpetrator trauma =

PTSD symptoms caused by committing a violent act

Perpetrator trauma, also known as perpetration- or participation-induced traumatic stress, both abbreviated to PITS, occurs when the symptoms of posttraumatic stress disorder (PTSD) are caused by an act or acts of killing or similar violence.

Perpetrator trauma is similar but distinct from moral injury, which focuses on the psychological, cultural, and spiritual aspects of a perceived moral transgression which produces profound shame.

== As a psychiatric disorder ==
=== Status ===
The DSM-5 addresses the idea of active participation as a cause of trauma under the discussion accompanying its definition of PTSD, and adds to the list of causal factors: "for military personnel, being a perpetrator, witnessing atrocities, or killing the enemy."

There has been some study with combat veterans, people who carry out executions or torture, police who shoot in the line of duty, people who commit criminal homicide, and others.

=== Severity ===
All studies that have considered the question of severity, have indicated that symptoms tend to be more severe for those who have killed, than for other causes of traumatization. One study using the U.S. government database of American veterans of Vietnam has suggested that the pattern of symptoms in combat veterans may be different in those who said they had killed, as opposed to those who said they had not. Symptoms include intrusive imagery, dreams, flashbacks and unwanted thoughts being more prominent; along with explosive outbursts of anger, concentration and memory problems being less prominent.

To a lesser extent, hypervigilance, a sense of alienation, and the non-PTSD symptom of a sense of disintegration were found to be greater for those who answered yes on killing. Alcohol and cocaine use disorder appeared to be more severe.

=== Dream motifs ===
Compared to the victim form of being traumatized, there are different dream motifs reported. While the eidetic dreams – that is, those that are like a video of the event playing in the head – can be experienced as they are with traumatized victims, other motifs also appear more commonly. One is of having the tables turned and being the one killed, or being very vulnerable in the same situation. Another motif is that of the victims accusing the dreaming person, or demanding to know why he or she did it. Also possible, is a motif of the self being split in two, so that the killer part of the person is seen as actually being a different person.

== Therapy ==
Therapies that have shown some effectiveness in the treatment of perpetrator trauma include group therapy, eye movement desensitization and reprocessing, Time Perspective Therapy and understanding how common the problem is. Those who suffer, many of whom participated in violence as a matter of social expectation, find it beneficial to know that they are having a normal reaction to an abnormal situation, and are not uniquely cowardly or crazy. Traditional remedies of atonement, forgiveness, and bearing witness have also stood the test of time as being helpful. More vigorous studies are needed for all these suggestions, as well as common PTSD therapies that have not yet been thoroughly explored, with the distinction of perpetration versus victimization in mind.

Other proposed treatments have been proven to be ineffective. The "flooding" technique, technically called Prolonged Exposure, which desensitizes the sufferer of trauma by repeated exposure to reminders of it in controlled settings, appears to be a bad idea, counter-indicated when the trauma involved being active in inflicting harm. It may be that expressive writing, which most people find helpful in working through their traumas, instead increases anger in soldiers. Differences in what physiological mechanisms in what pharmaceutical drugs might be useful in therapy are not yet known.

In the 11th century, soldiers involved in the Norman conquest of England, took part in the church administered Ermenfrid Penitential, to atone for, and mentally process the violence they participated in.

== Cycles of violence ==
Several of the symptoms are capable of causing or allowing for renewed acts of violence. The outbursts of anger can have an impact in domestic violence and street crime. The sense of emotional numbing, detachment and estrangement from other people can contribute to these, along with contributing to participation in further battle activities or to apathetic reactions when violence is done by others. Associated substance use disorders may also have connections to acts of violence.

== Examples ==
Perpetrator trauma has been documented among the perpetrators of the Holocaust, the Indonesian Communist Purges, the Cambodian genocide, the South African apartheid.

=== Slaughterhouse workers ===
Slaughterhouse workers have been said to exhibit signs of perpetrator trauma. Workers have reported having repeated nightmares, increased emotional detachment, and increased aggression towards other humans. Rates of depression, anxiety, alcoholism, and drug use are high. A study in North Carolina found depression to be 80% higher in slaughterhouse workers than the general population after adjusting for economic status and physical health. In a study asking slaughterhouse workers in South Africa to describe their experience, one described it as:

As time passes, you get used to it. You feel nothing. You can imagine, if you kill a thing a 1000 times over and over, you wouldn't have feelings after a while. It kills you on the inside, an abattoir, it kills you. You can be full of blood, it will not bother you.

Ed Van Winkle, a former worker at a hog slaughterhouse in the US, described his experiences similarly:

“The worst thing, worse than the physical danger, is the emotional toll... Pigs down on the kill floor have come up and nuzzled me like a puppy. Two minutes later I had to kill them—beat them to death with a pipe. I can’t care.”

Other workers have described themselves as feeling "like a robot." Former workers have reported flashback triggers from seeing meat and transport trucks. Rates of violence from former and current slaughterhouse workers are high. A study in Queensland, Australia found that the rates of physical aggression and hostility in meat industry workers were similar to the averages for the incarcerated population. Some authors have theorized that the desensitization of violence towards non-human animals leads to less care and inhibition on violence towards humans.

=== Soldiers ===
In writing about the experiences of American soldiers during the Iraq War, the psychiatrist R. J. Lifton claims in the aftermath of the Haditha massacre:

The alleged crimes in Iraq, like My Lai, are examples of what I call an atrocity-producing situation—one so structured, psychologically and militarily, that ordinary people, men or women no better or worse than you or I, can commit atrocities. A major factor in all of these events was the emotional state of US soldiers as they struggled with angry grief over buddies killed by invisible adversaries, with a desperate need to identify an 'enemy.'

Referring to the definition of "atrocity-producing situation", Morag (2013) was one of the first scholars to theorize perpetrator trauma and delineate the victim-perpetrator distinction in the context of the twenty-first century new war on terror. According to Morag's theorization, perpetrator trauma as an ethical trauma has been documented among Israeli soldiers during the Intifada as well US soldiers in Iraq and Afghanistan.

== See also ==
- Moral injury
- Shooting and crying
