= Analytics (disambiguation) =

Analytics is the systematic computational analysis of data or statistics.

Analytics may also refer to:

- Analytics (ice hockey), the analysis of the characteristics of hockey players and teams through the use of statistics and other tools
- Analytics (basketball), analyzing basketball statistics through objective evidence
- Adobe Analytics, part of Adobe Experience Cloud
- Google Analytics, a web analytics service offered by Google

== See also ==
- Analytic (disambiguation)
- Prior Analytics, a treatise by Aristotle
- Posterior Analytics, a treatise by Aristotle
