= Shooting and crying =

Expression associated with media portrayals of the Israeli military

"Shooting and crying" (Hebrew: יוֹרִים וְבּוֹכִים, romanized: yorim ve bochim) is an expression used to describe books, films or other forms of media that portray soldiers expressing remorse for actions they undertook during their service. It has often been associated with a practice that some former Israel Defense Force soldiers follow.

== Descriptions ==
Gil Hochberg described "shooting and crying" as a soldier being "sorry for things I had to do." This "non-apologetic apology" was the self-critique model advanced in Israel in many politically reflective works of literature and cinema as "a way of maintaining the nation's self-image as youthful and innocent. Along with its sense of vocation against the reality of war, growing military violence, occupation, invasion, [there was] [...] an overall sense that things were going wrong."

Felice Naomi Wonnenberg (writing for the book Contemporary Jewish Reality in Germany and Its Reflection in Film) described "shooting and crying" as people being "aware of the problematic issues of war, yet still take part in it."

Sarah Benton described it as "an act through which the soldier cleans his conscience (at least somewhat), without taking personal responsibility or any practical steps, either to prevent 'inappropriate behaviour by soldiers in the field' as it occurs or to redress injustice and prosecute criminals later."

== List of media associated with this term ==
=== Literature ===
- Si’ah Lohamim (Fighters’ Discourse) (1968)

=== Film ===
- Shoot and Cry (1988)
- Time for Cherries (1991)
- Beaufort (2007)
- Waltz with Bashir (2008)
- Lebanon (2009)

=== Television ===
- Fauda (2015–20)

== See also ==
- Cinema of Israel
- Command responsibility
- Cognitive dissonance
- Hypocrisy
- Military–entertainment complex
- Military psychology
- Misery lit
- Mistakes were made
- Moral injury
- Perpetrator trauma
