= Artificial (disambiguation) =

Artificiality is the condition of being the product of intentional human manufacture.

Artificial may also refer to:

== Film and television ==
- Artificial (2012 film), an Indian Telugu-language short film
- Artificial (2026 film), a biographical comedy drama directed by Luca Guadagnino
- Artificial, a 2018–2019 web series created by Evan Mandery and Bernie Su

== Music ==
- Artificial, a 1999 album by God Module
- Artificial, a 2010 album by Unitopia
- "Artificial" (Daughtry song), 2023
- "Artificial", a 2024 song by Katy Perry featuring JID from 143
- "Artificial", a 2008 song by Kris Menace and Felix da Housecat

== Other uses ==
- Artificial, a type of call in the game of contract bridge; see Glossary of contract bridge terms#artificial
