= Synthesis =

Synthesis or synthesize may refer to:

== Science ==
=== Chemistry and biochemistry ===
- Chemical synthesis, the execution of chemical reactions to form a more complex molecule from chemical precursors
  - Organic synthesis, the chemical synthesis of organic compounds
    - Total synthesis, the complete organic synthesis of complex organic compounds, usually without the aid of biological processes
    - Convergent synthesis or linear synthesis, a strategy to improve the efficiency of multi-step chemical syntheses
  - Dehydration synthesis, a chemical synthesis resulting in the loss of a water molecule
- Biosynthesis, the creation of an organic compound in a living organism, usually aided by enzymes
  - Photosynthesis, a biochemical reaction using a carbon molecule to produce an organic molecule, using sunlight as a catalyst
  - Chemosynthesis, the synthesis of biological compounds into organic waste, using methane or an oxidized molecule as a catalyst
  - Amino acid synthesis, the synthesis of an amino acid from its constituents
    - Peptide synthesis, the biochemical synthesis of peptides using amino acids
      - Protein biosynthesis, the multi-step biochemical synthesis of proteins (long peptides)
  - DNA synthesis, several biochemical processes for making DNA
    - DNA replication, DNA biosynthesis in vivo
    - Synthesis (cell cycle)
  - RNA synthesis, the synthesis of RNA from nucleic acids, using another nucleic acid chain as a template
  - ATP synthesis, the biochemical synthesis of ATP

=== Physics ===
- Nucleosynthesis, the process of creating new atomic nuclei from pre-existing nucleons
- Kinematic synthesis, part of the process of designing a machine to achieve its objective

=== Electronics ===
- Logic synthesis, the process of converting a higher-level form of a design into a lower-level implementation
- High-level synthesis, an automated design process that interprets an algorithmic description of a desired behavior and creates hardware that implements that behavior
- Frequency synthesizer, an electronic system for generating any of a range of frequencies

=== Speech and sound creation ===
- Sound synthesis, various methods of sound generation in audio electronics
  - Wave field synthesis, a spatial audio rendering technique, characterized by creation of virtual acoustic environments
  - Subtractive synthesis, a method of creating a sound by removing harmonics, characterised by the application of an audio filter to an audio signal
  - Frequency modulation synthesis, a form of audio synthesis where the timbre of a simple waveform is changed by frequency modulating it with a modulating frequency that is also in the audio range
- Speech synthesis, the artificial production of human speech

== Humanities ==
- In philosophy, the end result of a dialectic as in thesis, antithesis, synthesis
- A cognitive skill in Benjamin Bloom's Taxonomy of Educational Objectives
- In philosophy and cognitive science, a foundational a priori process
- In linguistics, a scale denoting the average ratio of morphemes to words; see synthetic language
- In legal theory, the process of condensing and combining large quantities of information

== Music ==
- Synthesis (The Cryan' Shames album), 1968
- Synthesis (Reggie Workman album), 1986
- Synthesis (Glaiza de Castro album), 2015
- Synthesis (Evanescence album), 2017

== Other uses ==
- Anarchist synthesis, a form of anarchist organization which tries to join anarchists of different tendencies
- Synthesis (clothing), a garment or outfit worn in ancient Rome for dining or special occasions
- Synthesis, a 1974 Indian short animated film by A. R. Sen and B. R. Dohling, winner of the National Film Award for Best Non-Feature Animation Film
- Synthesis (journal), a journal of chemical synthesis
- Program synthesis, a task in computer science to automatically generate programs from a formal specification

== See also ==
- Analysis, the converse of synthesis
- Carlson curve
- Synthesizer (disambiguation)
- Synthetic (disambiguation)
- Creation (disambiguation)
- Formation (disambiguation)
- Production (disambiguation)
- Derivation (disambiguation)
