= Artificiality =

State of being the product of intentional human manufacture

Artificiality (the state of being artificial, anthropogenic, or man-made) is the condition of being the product of intentional human manufacture (namely, by artifice), rather than occurring naturally through processes not involving or requiring human activity.

== Connotations ==
Artificiality often carries the implication of being false, counterfeit, or deceptive. The philosopher Aristotle wrote in his Rhetoric:

Naturalness is persuasive, artificiality is the contrary; for our hearers are prejudiced and think we have some design against them, as if we were mixing their wines for them. It is like the difference between the quality of Theodorus' voice and the voices of all other actors: his really seems to be that of the character who is speaking, theirs do not.

However, artificiality does not necessarily have a negative connotation, as it may also reflect the ability of humans to replicate forms or functions arising in nature, as with an artificial heart or artificial intelligence. Political scientist and artificial intelligence expert Herbert A. Simon observes that "some artificial things are imitations of things in nature, and the imitation may use either the same basic materials as those in the natural object or quite different materials. Simon distinguishes between the artificial and the synthetic, the former being an imitation of something found in nature (for example, an artificial sweetener which generates sweetness using a formula not found in nature), and the latter being a replication of something found in nature (for example, a sugar created in a laboratory that is chemically indistinguishable from a naturally occurring sugar). Some philosophers have gone further and asserted that, in a deterministic world, "everything is natural and nothing is artificial", because everything in the world (including everything made by humans) is a product of the physical laws of the world.

== Distinguishing natural objects from artificial objects ==
Pattern resembling a reaction–diffusion model, produced using sharpen and blur.

It is generally possible for humans, and in some instances, for computers, to distinguish natural from artificial environments. The artificial environment tends to have more physical regularity both spatially and over time, with natural environments tending to have irregular structures that change over time. However, on close observation it is possible to discern some mathematical structures and patterns in natural environments, which can then be replicated to create an artificial environment with a more natural appearance.

For example, by identifying and imitating natural means of pattern formation, some types of automata have been used to generate organic-looking textures for more realistic shading of 3D objects.

== See also ==
- Cultural artifact
- Fake (disambiguation)
- Homo faber
- Simulation
- Synthetic (disambiguation)
- Tamagotchi
