= Synthetic =

Synthetic may refer to:

== Science ==
- Synthetic biology
- Synthetic chemical or compound, produced by the process of chemical synthesis
- Synthetic drug, substances that are artificially modified from naturally occurring drugs
- Synthetic elements, chemical elements that are not naturally found on Earth and therefore have to be created in experiments
- Synthetic organic compounds synthetic chemical compounds based on carbon (organic compounds).
- Synthetic peptide
- Synthetic population
- Synthetic population (biology)

== Industry ==
- Synthetic diamond
- Synthetic fibers, cloth or other material made from other substances than natural (animal, plant) materials
- Synthetic fuel
- Synthetic marijuana
- Synthetic oil
- Synthetic rubber

== Other ==
- Synthetic position, a concept in finance
- Synthetic-aperture radar, a type or radar
- Analytic–synthetic distinction, in philosophy
- Synthetic language in linguistics, inflected or agglutinative languages
- Synthetic intelligence a term emphasizing that true intelligence expressed by computing machines is not an imitation or "artificial."
- Synthetic or constructed language, such as Esperanto
- Synthetic music, produced by a synthesizer, a machine to create artificial sound and music
- Synthetic chord in music theory
- Synthetic person or legal personality, characteristic of a non-human entity regarded by law as having the status of a person
- Synthetic data, are any data applicable to a given situation that are not obtained by direct measurement or from live system as described in synthetic data; terminology used in testing of software applications
- Synthetic monitoring, (also known as active monitoring) is website monitoring that is done using a web browser emulation or scripted recordings of web transactions
- Synthetic setae, emulate the anatomical processes found on various animals, including the feet of basilisk lizards and the toes of geckos
- "Synthetic", a song by Spineshank from The Height of Callousness, 2000

== See also ==
- Artificial (disambiguation)
- Man-made (disambiguation)
- Medication
- Plastic
- Synthetic phonics
