= List of awards and nominations received by Mike Leigh =

Mike Leigh awards and nominations
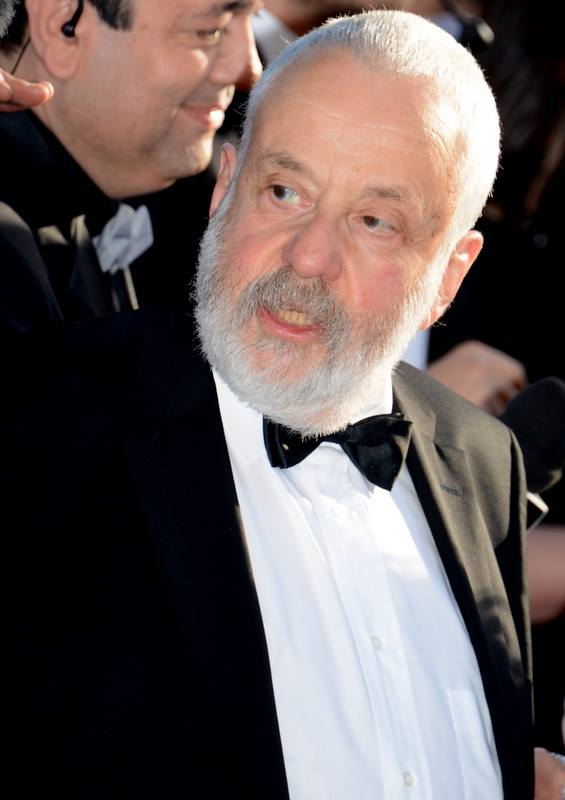
Awards and nominations
Award	Wins	Nominations
Academy Award	0	7
British Academy Film Award	3	14
Independent Spirit Award	1	6

Mike Leigh is an English filmmaker. He has received seven Academy Award nominations, and thirteen British Academy Film Award nominations receiving three awards for Secrets & Lies (1996) and Vera Drake (2004). In 2014 he received the BAFTA Fellowship for Outstanding British Contribution to Film. He has also received five Independent Spirit Award nominations for Best International Film winning for Secrets & Lies.

He has also received various award nominations from film festivals including eight nominations from the Cannes Film Festival winning four awards including the Palme d'Or for Secrets & Lies as well as awards for Naked, and Another Year. He also received three nominations from the Berlin International Film Festival winning twice for his Meantime and The Short & Curlies. At the Venice International Film Festival he received five nominations winning the prestigious Golden Lion award for Topsy-Turvy and Vera Drake.

== Major associations ==
=== Academy Awards ===
Year	Category	Nominated work	Result	Ref.
1996	Best Director	Secrets & Lies	Nominated	
1996	Best Original Screenplay	Secrets & Lies	Nominated	
1999	Best Original Screenplay	Topsy Turvy	Nominated	
2004	Best Director	Vera Drake	Nominated	
2004	Best Original Screenplay	Vera Drake	Nominated	
2008	Best Original Screenplay	Happy-Go-Lucky	Nominated	
2010	Best Original Screenplay	Another Year	Nominated	

=== British Academy Film Awards ===
Year	Category	Nominated work	Result	Ref.
1987	Best Short Film	The Short and Curlies	Nominated	
1992	Best Short Film	Sense of History	Nominated	
1993	Outstanding British Film	Naked	Nominated	
1995	Michael Balcon Award		Received	
1996	Best Film	Secrets & Lies	Nominated	
1996	Outstanding British Film	Secrets & Lies	Won	
1996	Best Direction	Secrets & Lies	Nominated	
1996	Best Original Screenplay	Secrets & Lies	Won	
1999	Outstanding British Film	Topsy-Turvy	Nominated	
1999	Best Original Screenplay	Topsy-Turvy	Nominated	
2004	Outstanding British Film	Vera Drake	Nominated	
2004	Best Direction	Vera Drake	Won	
2004	Best Original Screenplay	Vera Drake	Nominated	
2010	Outstanding British Film	Another Year	Nominated	
2014	BAFTA Fellowship		Received	
2024	Outstanding British Film	Hard Truths	Nominated	

=== Independent Spirit Awards ===
Year	Category	Nominated work	Result	Ref.
1989	Best International Film	High Hopes	Nominated	
1991	Best International Film	Life is Sweet	Nominated	
1993	Best International Film	Naked	Nominated	
1996	Best International Film	Secrets & Lies	Won	
1999	Best International Film	Topsy-Turvy	Nominated	
2024	Best International Film	Hard Truths	Nominated	

== Festivals ==
=== Berlin Film Festival ===
Year	Category	Nominated work	Result	Ref.
1984	Reader Jury Award	Meantime	Won	
1988	Panorama Short Film Award	The Short and Curlies	Won	
2008	Golden Bear	Happy-Go-Lucky	Nominated	

=== Cannes Film Festival ===
Year	Category	Nominated work	Result	Ref.
1993	Palme d'Or	Naked	Nominated	
1993	Best Director	Naked	Won	
1996	Palme d'Or	Secrets & Lies	Won	
1996	Prize of the Ecumenical Jury	Secrets & Lies	Won	
2002	Palme d'Or	All or Nothing	Nominated	
2010	Palme d'Or	Another Year	Nominated	
2010	Prize of the Ecumenical Jury	Another Year	Won	
2014	Palme d'Or	Mr. Turner	Nominated	

=== Venice Film Festival ===
Year	Category	Nominated work	Result	Ref.
1988	FIPRESCI Prize	High Hopes	Nominated	
1999	Golden Lion	Topsy-Turvy	Nominated	
2004	Golden Lion	Vera Drake	Won	
2018	Golden Lion	Peterloo	Nominated	
2018	Human Rights Award	Peterloo	Won	
