= Georgina Lowe =

British television producer

Georgina Lowe is a British film and television producer, who has produced director Mike Leigh's films since 2009.

Among her TV Producer credits are the BBC miniseries Tipping the Velvet (2002), Fingersmith (2005), the ITV1 series Kingdom (2007–2009) and the Agatha Christie series Partners in Crime (2015), Sky's Mad Dogs,(2012), Mammals (2022) and Malice (2025) for Amazon Prime Video.

After starting work in corporate films, documentaries, then music videos and commercials, she started working with Mike Leigh and his producer Simon Channing Williams, as production manager on Naked. Since then she has been involved in the production of all Leigh's films.

She co-produced Topsy-Turvy (1999), All or Nothing (2002), Vera Drake (2004) and Happy-Go-Lucky (2008).

In 2011, Mike Leigh made her his partner in Thin Man Films, the production company he started with Channing Williams in 1988.

She produced Mike Leigh's Another Year (2010), A Running Jump (2012) and Mr. Turner (2014), Peterloo (2017) and Hard Truths (2024).

She has been BAFTA nominated for the TV series Fingersmith and for the film Another Year.

She is married with two children.
