= Happy-Go-Lucky (2008 film) =

2008 film by Mike Leigh

- Theatrical release poster
- Directed by: Mike Leigh
- Written by: Mike Leigh
- Produced by: Simon Channing Williams
- Starring: Sally Hawkins; Eddie Marsan; Alexis Zegerman; Sylvestra Le Touzel; Stanley Townsend; Kate O'Flynn; Caroline Martin; Oliver Maltman; Sarah Niles; Samuel Roukin; Karina Fernandez; Nonso Anozie
- Cinematography: Dick Pope
- Edited by: Jim Clark
- Music by: Gary Yershon
- Production companies: Summit Entertainment; Ingenious Film Partners; Film4; UK Film Council; Thin Man Films
- Distributed by: Momentum Pictures (United Kingdom); Summit Entertainment (Overseas)
- Release dates: 12 February 2008 (Berlinale); 18 April 2008 (United Kingdom)
- Running time: 118 minutes
- Country: United Kingdom
- Language: English
- Box office: $18.7 million

Happy-Go-Lucky is a 2008 British comedy-drama film, written and directed by Mike Leigh. It stars Sally Hawkins as a cheerful and optimistic London primary school teacher, with Eddie Marsan and Alexis Zegerman in supporting roles.

Happy-Go-Lucky premiered on 12 February 2008 at the 58th Berlin International Film Festival, where Hawkins won the Silver Bear for Best Actress. Upon its wide release in April, the film went on to gross $18.7 million at the worldwide box office. Happy-Go-Lucky was well received by critics, who praised Leigh's direction and screenplay, as well as the performances of Hawkins and Marsan. At the 66th Golden Globe Awards, Hawkins won Best Actress in a Motion Picture – Musical or Comedy. At the 81st Academy Awards, Leigh was nominated for Best Original Screenplay.

== Plot ==
Thirty years old and single, Pauline "Poppy" Cross shares a London flat with her best friend Zoe, a fellow primary school teacher. Poppy is optimistic, high-spirited and kindhearted, and enjoys going out clubbing with her friends, spending her free time preparing projects for her students, and jumping on a trampoline. She gets along well with her co-workers, and takes flamenco dancing lessons with the head teacher at her school. When she tries to engage shop employees in conversation, she is undeterred if they ignore her, and she maintains her good mood even when she discovers her bicycle has been stolen—her main concern is not finding the bicycle or getting a new one, but that she did not get a chance to say goodbye to it.

Deciding to begin driving, Poppy signs up for lessons and is paired with a moody, intolerant and cynical instructor, Scott. He is emotionally repressed, has anger problems, and becomes extremely agitated when he feels that Poppy is not taking driving seriously enough. Scott seems to be angered by Poppy's sunny personality, and is exceptionally irritated by her choice of footwear—a pair of high-heeled boots—which he feels compromises her ability to drive. As Poppy gets to know him, it becomes evident that Scott believes in conspiracy theories. His beliefs are partly attributable to his racist and misogynistic views, which make it hard for him to get along with others.

At school, Poppy observes Nick, one of her pupils, bullying his classmates. Instead of scolding him, she worries about him and, after speaking with the boy, deduces that he is being abused at home. A social worker, Tim, is brought in to handle the case, and Nick eventually reveals that his mother's boyfriend has been beating him.

Zoe, Poppy, and Poppy's youngest sister, Suzy, go to visit Poppy and Suzy's pregnant middle sister, Helen, who lives with her husband in Southend-on-Sea. After dinner, Helen, who is much more serious than Poppy and Suzy, tells Poppy that she needs to "take life seriously", "not get drunk every night", and plan for the future, like her. Poppy responds that she is happy with her life as it is, and Helen is the one who ends up storming off, saying she feels like she is being attacked for choosing the more conventional life.

Returning home, Poppy sees Scott standing across the street from her flat, but he runs away when she calls his name. Poppy goes out on a date with Tim, and Scott sees her with Tim when he picks her up for her next driving lesson. She asks Scott why he had run off, but he insists he was visiting his mother in Stevenage at the time she saw him. Scott is even more irritable than usual, driving erratically while ranting about other drivers and society. When Poppy gets in the driver's seat, she tells Scott that he is in no condition to drive, and that she will drive them back to her flat. He tries to get his keys back and ultimately grabs her and shakes her, but she escapes his grasp. In a long, rambling diatribe, Scott accuses Poppy of trying to seduce him, revealing his romantic feelings for her. Although she is able to calm him down enough to feel comfortable giving the keys back, when he meekly asks, "Same time next week?", she sadly informs him that they have had their last lesson and walks home.

Poppy and Zoe rent a rowboat in Regent's Park, and Zoe tells Poppy that she "can't make everyone happy". Poppy cheerfully dismisses the advice, then takes a mobile call from Tim, greeting him with, "Missing me already?"

== Cast ==
- Sally Hawkins as Pauline "Poppy" Cross, a primary school teacher
- Eddie Marsan as Scott, a driving instructor
- Alexis Zegerman as Zoe, Poppy's roommate and best friend, who is also a primary school teacher
- Sylvestra Le Touzel as Heather, the head teacher at Poppy's school
- Stanley Townsend as a tramp Poppy comes across
- Kate O'Flynn as Suzy, Poppy's youngest sister
- Caroline Martin as Helen, Poppy's younger sister
- Oliver Maltman as Jamie, Helen's husband
- Sarah Niles as Tash, a teacher at Poppy's school
- Samuel Roukin as Tim, a social worker who goes on a date with Poppy
- Karina Fernandez as Rosita Santos, a flamenco teacher
- Nonso Anozie as Ezra, a physiotherapist
- Sinead Matthews as Alice, Poppy's friend
- Andrea Riseborough as Dawn, Poppy's friend
- Jack MacGeachin as Nick, one of Poppy's students

== Production ==
Happy-Go-Lucky is Mike Leigh's first film shot in the 2.35:1 aspect ratio anamorphic format. It was made and distributed with the assistance of National Lottery funding through the UK Film Council, with £1.2 million awarded to the production company, and a further £210,000 awarded to the film's UK distributor.

The film was shot on location in Camden Lock, Camden Market, Regent's Park, Stroud Green, Finsbury Park, Lambeth, and Tufnell Park in London, and in Southend-on-Sea in Essex.

In "Behind the Wheel of Happy-Go-Lucky", a bonus feature on the DVD release of the film, Leigh, cinematographer Dick Pope, and stars Sally Hawkins and Eddie Marsan discuss the logistics of filming the lengthy scenes in which Poppy is learning how to drive. Five miniature cameras were hidden throughout the vehicle, and the actors really drove, with Leigh wedged on the floor behind the front seats. Although the actors were required to adhere to basic plot premises, Leigh allowed more improvisation than usual when shooting these scenes, allowing them to react to and be influenced by real stimuli outside the car.

In "Happy-in-Character", another DVD bonus feature, Leigh and the actors discuss how the director works with his cast one-on-one to help them fully create their characters before introducing them to the other characters and ultimately crafting the story and script through extensive improvisations and rehearsals. Because Scott is such a troubled individual, Marsan initially thought he was preparing for a heavy drama, and it was not until he started working with Hawkins that he realised how funny the film was going to be.

== Release ==
Happy-Go-Lucky premiered at the 58th Berlin International Film Festival and was shown at the Dublin Film Festival before going into theatrical release in the United Kingdom on 18 April 2008. It later was featured at the Telluride Film Festival, the Toronto International Film Festival, the Rio de Janeiro International Film Festival, the New York Film Festival, the Athens Film Festival, the Mill Valley Film Festival, the Morelia Film Festival, the Chicago International Film Festival, the Warsaw International FilmFest, and the Tokyo International Film Festival.

== Reception ==
=== Critical response ===
On the review aggregator website Rotten Tomatoes, the films holds an approval rating of 93% based on 161 reviews, with an average rating of 8/10. The website's critics consensus reads, "Mike Leigh's latest partially improvised film is a light-hearted comedy with moments that bite, and features a brilliant star turn by Sally Hawkins." On Metacritic, which assigns a weighted average score out of 100 to reviews from mainstream critics, the film received an average score of 84, based on reviews from 34 critics, indicating "universal acclaim".

Peter Bradshaw of The Guardian rated the film four out of five stars, and said: "Mike Leigh's trademarked cartoony dialogue, as ever lending a neo-Dickensian compression and intensity to the proceedings, is an acquired taste and I have gladly acquired it, though some haven't. I am not quite sure what I think about the big, final confrontation between Poppy and Scott. It is well-acted and composed, and Marsan is ferociously convincing, yet the episode is closed off a little too neatly, and Poppy seems eerily unaffected by this or anything else. The effect is a kind of odd and steely invulnerability: not unattractive exactly, but disconcerting. Hawkins plays it superbly though: exactly right for the part and utterly at ease with a role that is uniquely demanding. In the factory-farmed blandness of the movies, Happy-Go-Lucky has a strong, real taste."

Philip French of The Observer called the film "as funny, serious, life-affirming and beautifully performed as anything Leigh has done, but with a lightness of touch only previously found in his Gilbert and Sullivan movie, Topsy-Turvy."

Manohla Dargis of The New York Times called the film "so closely tuned to the pulse of communal life, to the rhythms of how people work, play and struggle together, it captures the larger picture along with the smaller. Like Poppy, the bright focus of this expansive, moving film, Mr. Leigh isn't one to go it alone. Played by a glorious Sally Hawkins – a gurgling, burbling stream of gasps, giggles and words – Poppy ... keeps moving forward and dancing and jumping and laughing and nodding her dark, delicate head as if she were agreeing not just with this or that friend but also with life itself. She's altogether charming or perhaps maddening – much depends on whether you wear rose-colored specs – recognizably human and every inch a calculated work of art."

Roger Ebert of the Chicago Sun-Times rated the film four out of four stars, and called Sally Hawkins "a joy to behold". He added, "This is Mike Leigh's funniest film since Life Is Sweet. Of course he hasn't ever made a completely funny film, and Happy-Go-Lucky has scenes that are not funny, not at all. There are always undercurrents and oddness."

Peter Travers of Rolling Stone rated the film three-and-a-half out of four stars, and commented: "Get ready for Sally Hawkins, a dynamo of an actress who will have her way with you in Happy-Go-Lucky, leaving you enchanted, enraged to the point of madness and utterly dazzled. No list of the year's best performances should be made without her." He added: "In lesser hands, the film would go off the deep end into cheap theatrics. But Leigh ... keeps the emotions in balance by keeping them real. There's something raw in Hawkins that wins our empathy for Poppy. Thanks to her, Happy-Go-Lucky is more than a movie, it's a gift."

Ruthe Stein of the San Francisco Chronicle stated: "The key to enjoying the film, a minor effort by Leigh, is warming up to Poppy. Her bubbly personality may be too much for some. She's like a walking, talking smiley face. Fortunately, as Leigh proved in Secrets & Lies and Vera Drake, he has a keen eye for actresses, and he has found in Sally Hawkins the consummate Poppy."

Time Out London observed: "You know you're watching something both delightfully light-footed and acutely meaningful when Leigh moves so nimbly between scenes at Poppy's school, her flamenco class and her driving lessons ... It's a funny film ... and, crucially, it aches with truth."

=== Legacy ===
"En-ra-ha", a driver safety teaching tool used repeatedly by Marsan's character, Scott, as a reminder for the driver to look in the car's mirrors, has become a catch phrase associated both with the film and with Marsan as an actor. During a lesson, Scott explains to Poppy that "En-ra-ha" is a fallen angel, and refers to "the all-seeing eye" at the top of a "golden triangle" formed by a car's rearview mirror and side mirrors. Scott tells Poppy, "You see. You remember. You will remember Enraha till the day you die and I would have done my job." The name "En-ra-ha" was invented by Marsan during his improvisational preparation for the film, inspired by a recording of the English occultist Aleister Crowley.

=== Top ten lists ===
The film was cited as one of the ten best films of 2008 by many critics, including Manohla Dargis, Stephen Holden, and A. O. Scott of The New York Times; Liam Lacey of The Globe and Mail; Ray Bennett of The Hollywood Reporter; Shawn Levy of The Oregonian; Carrie Rickey of The Philadelphia Inquirer; David Edelstein of New York; Elizabeth Weitzman of the New York Daily News; Kimberly Jones of The Austin Chronicle; Michael Sragow of The Baltimore Sun; Kenneth Turan of the Los Angeles Times; Ann Hornaday of The Washington Post; Lisa Schwarzbaum of Entertainment Weekly; Dennis Harvey of Variety; and Steve Rea of The Philadelphia Inquirer. Armond White of the New York Press named Happy-Go-Lucky the best film of 2008.

=== Accolades ===
Award	Date of ceremony	Category	Recipient(s)	Result	Ref.
Academy Awards	22 February 2009	Best Original Screenplay	Mike Leigh	Nominated	
Alliance of Women Film Journalists	15 December 2008	Best Film	Happy-Go-Lucky	Nominated	
Alliance of Women Film Journalists	15 December 2008	Best Director	Mike Leigh	Nominated	
Alliance of Women Film Journalists	15 December 2008	Best Actress	Sally Hawkins	Won	
Alliance of Women Film Journalists	15 December 2008	Best Supporting Actor	Eddie Marsan	Nominated	
Alliance of Women Film Journalists	15 December 2008	Best Original Screenplay	Mike Leigh	Nominated	
Alliance of Women Film Journalists	15 December 2008	Best Ensemble Cast	Happy-Go-Lucky	Nominated	
Alliance of Women Film Journalists	15 December 2008	Best Breakthrough Performance	Sally Hawkins	Won	
Berlin International Film Festival	17 February 2008	Golden Bear	Happy-Go-Lucky	Nominated	
Berlin International Film Festival	17 February 2008	Best Actress	Sally Hawkins	Won	
Boston Society of Film Critics	13 December 2008	Best Actress	Sally Hawkins	Won	
Boston Society of Film Critics	13 December 2008	Best Screenplay	Mike Leigh	Runner-up	
British Independent Film Awards	13 December 2008	Best Actress	Sally Hawkins	Nominated	
British Independent Film Awards	13 December 2008	Best Supporting Actor	Eddie Marsan	Won	
British Independent Film Awards	13 December 2008	Best Supporting Actress	Alexis Zegerman	Won	
Chicago Film Critics Association	18 December 2008	Best Actress	Sally Hawkins	Nominated	
Dallas–Fort Worth Film Critics Association	17 December 2008	Best Film	Happy-Go-Lucky	10th Place	
Dallas–Fort Worth Film Critics Association	17 December 2008	Best Actress	Sally Hawkins	3rd Place	
Dallas–Fort Worth Film Critics Association	17 December 2008	Best Supporting Actor	Eddie Marsan	3rd Place	
Detroit Film Critics Society	15 December 2008	Best Actress	Sally Hawkins	Nominated	
Detroit Film Critics Society	15 December 2008	Best Supporting Actor	Eddie Marsan	Nominated	
Golden Globe Awards	11 January 2009	Best Motion Picture – Musical or Comedy	Happy-Go-Lucky	Nominated	
Golden Globe Awards	11 January 2009	Best Actress – Motion Picture Musical or Comedy	Sally Hawkins	Won	
London Film Critics Circle	4 February 2009	British Film of the Year	Happy-Go-Lucky	Nominated	
London Film Critics Circle	4 February 2009	British Director of the Year	Mike Leigh	Nominated	
London Film Critics Circle	4 February 2009	British Actress of the Year	Sally Hawkins	Nominated	
London Film Critics Circle	4 February 2009	British Supporting Actor of the Year	Eddie Marsan	Won	
London Film Critics Circle	4 February 2009	British Supporting Actress of the Year	Alexis Zegerman	Nominated	
Los Angeles Film Critics Association	9 December 2008	Best Actress	Sally Hawkins	Won	
Los Angeles Film Critics Association	9 December 2008	Best Supporting Actor	Eddie Marsan	Runner-up	
Los Angeles Film Critics Association	9 December 2008	Best Screenplay	Mike Leigh	Won	
New York Film Critics Circle	5 January 2009	Best Director	Mike Leigh	Won	
New York Film Critics Circle	5 January 2009	Best Actress	Sally Hawkins	Won	
New York Film Critics Online	15 December 2008	Top 10 Films	Happy-Go-Lucky	Won	
New York Film Critics Online	15 December 2008	Best Actress	Sally Hawkins	Won	
Online Film Critics Society	19 January 2009	Best Actress	Sally Hawkins	Nominated	
Online Film Critics Society	19 January 2009	Best Supporting Actor	Eddie Marsan	Nominated	
San Francisco Film Critics Circle	15 December 2008	Best Actress	Sally Hawkins	Won	
Satellite Awards	14 December 2008	Best Motion Picture – Musical or Comedy	Happy-Go-Lucky	Won	
Satellite Awards	14 December 2008	Best Actress – Motion Picture Musical or Comedy	Sally Hawkins	Won	
