= Andrew Dickson =

English music composer

Andrew Dickson (born 1945 in Isleworth, London) is an English music composer, who won a European Composer Award for his work on the 1988 film High Hopes. He has composed for TV dramas and has also worked in theatre as an actor, director, musical director, musician and composer.

== Filmography ==
=== As composer ===
- Meantime – 1983
- High Hopes – 1988
- Naked – 1993
- Oublie-moi – 1994
- Someone Else's America – 1995
- Secrets & Lies – 1996
- All or Nothing – 2002
- Vera Drake – 2004

=== As actor ===
- Facelift – 1984 as pit orchestra
- Dutch Girls – 1985 as guitarist

=== As musician ===
- Meantime (TV Movie) – 1983
