= Another Year (film) =

2010 film by Mike Leigh

- Theatrical release poster
- Directed by: Mike Leigh
- Written by: Mike Leigh
- Produced by: Georgina Lowe
- Starring: Jim Broadbent; Lesley Manville; Ruth Sheen
- Cinematography: Dick Pope
- Edited by: Jon Gregory
- Music by: Gary Yershon
- Production companies: Film4; UK Film Council; Thin Man Films
- Distributed by: Momentum Pictures (United Kingdom); Focus Features International (International)
- Release dates: 15 May 2010 (Cannes); 5 November 2010 (United Kingdom)
- Running time: 129 minutes
- Country: United Kingdom
- Language: English
- Budget: $8 million
- Box office: $20 million

Another Year is a 2010 British comedy-drama film written and directed by Mike Leigh. It stars Jim Broadbent, Lesley Manville, and Ruth Sheen. It follows a year in the life of an older couple who have been happily married for a long time, making them an anomaly among their friends and family members.

The film had its world premiere at the 63rd Cannes Film Festival on 15 May 2010, and was theatrically released in the United Kingdom on 5 November 2010, by Momentum Pictures. It grossed $20 million worldwide and received positive reviews from critics, who praised Leigh's screenplay and the performances of the cast (particularly Manville). It was nominated for Best British Film and Best Actress in a Supporting Role (for Manville) at the 64th British Academy Film Awards, while Leigh earned a Best Original Screenplay nomination at the 83rd Academy Awards. The film was also nominated for Best Actress (for Manville) and Best Composer at the 23rd European Film Awards.

== Plot ==
Tom Hepple, a geologist, and Gerri Hepple, a counsellor, are an older married couple who have a comfortable, loving relationship. The film observes them over the course of the four seasons of a year, surrounded by family and friends who mostly suffer some degree of unhappiness.

Gerri's friend and colleague Mary works as a receptionist at the health centre. She is a middle-aged divorcee seeking a new relationship, and despite telling everyone she is happy, appears desperate and depressed, and seems to drink too much. The Hepples' only child, Joe, is 30 and single and works as a solicitor giving advice on housing.

In the summer, the Hepples are visited by Ken, Tom's old friend from his student days. Ken is overweight, eats, smokes and drinks compulsively and seems very unhappy. Tom and Gerri host a barbecue in his honour. Mary drives her newly bought car to the party, but gets lost and arrives late. Having had some wine, she flirts with Joe, whom she has known since he was little. He remains friendly but does not reciprocate. After the party, Mary reluctantly gives Ken a lift to the train station. He makes a clumsy romantic advance and Mary irritably rejects him.

Months later, in the autumn, Mary is once again at Tom and Gerri's home. Joe arrives with Katie, a new girlfriend. Mary appears rude and hostile towards Katie, which Tom and Gerri don't appreciate, creating a rift between Gerri and Mary.

In the winter, Tom, Gerri, and Joe attend the funeral for the wife of Tom's brother Ronnie. Towards the end of the service, Ronnie's estranged son Carl arrives, and angrily asks why the ceremony was not delayed for him. At the reception at Ronnie's house, Carl becomes aggressive and walks out. Tom and Gerri invite Ronnie back to London to stay with them for a while and Ronnie agrees.

While Tom and Gerri are at their garden allotment, Mary arrives unannounced at their home and persuades Ronnie to let her in. Her car has just been wrecked and she is upset. They have a cup of tea and a desultory chat before Mary takes a nap on the settee. When Tom and Gerri return, they are unhappy to find Mary there. Gerri explains to Mary that she feels let down by her earlier behaviour towards Katie. Mary apologises and weeps. Gerri gradually extends a degree of warmth to Mary, suggesting she should seek counseling and inviting her to stay for dinner, and the two women set the table. Joe and Katie arrive, their relationship still appearing strong and happy. The Hepples enjoy dinner together. Mary eats with them but appears lost and uncertain.

== Cast ==
- Jim Broadbent as Tom Hepple
- Ruth Sheen as Gerri Hepple
- Lesley Manville as Mary Smith
- Peter Wight as Ken
- Oliver Maltman as Joe Hepple
- David Bradley as Ronnie Hepple
- Karina Fernandez as Katie
- Martin Savage as Carl Hepple
- Michele Austin as Tanya
- Philip Davis as Jack
- Stuart McQuarrie as Tom's colleague
- Imelda Staunton as Janet

== Production ==
Because the director's usual producer Simon Channing-Williams died in 2009, Another Year was produced by Georgina Lowe, who had worked regularly on Mike Leigh films since Naked (1993). Thin Man Films led the production together with television channel Film4 and Focus Features International. The project received £1.2 million from the UK Film Council. The production involved a budget of around US$8 million, which Leigh said was "the lowest budget I've had for a long time".

Most of Another Year's key cast members had already worked with the director multiple times. Leigh collaborated with the actors for five months to create their characters and world and to do research. The director employed his usual technique: the actors improvise extensively during rehearsals, and the result of those improvisations becomes the basis of the final script. Principal photography took 12 weeks. To simulate the four seasons of a year, cinematographer Dick Pope used four different film stocks, and much attention was paid to details in the props so that the passage of time would appear believable.

The location used for Tom and Gerri Hepple's house is St Margaret's Road, Wanstead, East London.

== Release ==
Another Year premiered at the 63rd Cannes Film Festival on 15 May 2010, where it competed for the Palme d'Or, and was also screened at the 35th Toronto International Film Festival on 13 September, the 48th New York Film Festival on 5 October, and the 54th BFI London Film Festival on 18 October. The film was then released in the United Kingdom on 5 November 2010, by Momentum Pictures, and in the United States on 29 December 2010, by Sony Pictures Classics.

== Reception ==
=== Critical response ===
On the review aggregator website Rotten Tomatoes, 93% of 170 critics' reviews are positive, with an average rating of 8.2/10. The website's consensus reads: "Characterized by strong performances and the director's trademark feel for the nuances of everyday life, Another Year marks another solid entry in Mike Leigh's career of kitchen-sink English drama." Metacritic, which uses a weighted average, assigned the film a score of 81 out of 100, based on 36 critics, indicating "universal acclaim".

Another Year debuted at Cannes and although it failed to receive any prizes, it was highly praised by critics, scoring a 3.4/4 average at Screen International's annual Cannes Jury Grid, which polls international film critics from publications such as Sight & Sound, Positif, L'Unità and Der Tagesspiegel.

Wendy Ide of The Times described the film as "Leigh at his confident best" and "a disarmingly humane work", writing, "Mike Leigh shows admirable restraint: there are no manufactured crescendos, just a melancholy refrain that builds to its raw realisation in an achingly sad final shot." Xan Brooks of The Guardian described Another Year as "a rare treat", and Geoffrey Macnab of The Independent described the film as "an acutely well-observed study of needy and unhappy people desperately trying to make sense of their lives."

Kenneth Turan of the Los Angeles Times wrote, "Another Year is about the turning wheel of life, an examination of the pleasures and jealousies, disappointments and insecurities, destroyed dreams and rekindled hopes that make up our daily existence. It may sound commonplace, but in the hands of master filmmaker Mike Leigh, the everyday becomes extraordinary." A. O. Scott of The New York Times called the film "splendidly rich and wise" and opined that "as in its immediate precursor, Happy-Go-Lucky, Mr. Leigh is also after a more elusive and troubling form of injustice." Ann Hornaday of The Washington Post gave the film three out of four stars, and described it as "a joy, albeit one suffused with melancholy - a visually rich, musical, unmannered slice of life that magnifies experience rather than miniaturizing it."

=== Accolades ===
Award	Date of ceremony	Category	Recipient(s)	Result
Academy Awards	27 February 2011	Best Original Screenplay	Mike Leigh	Nominated
Belgian Syndicate of Cinema Critics	8 January 2011	Grand Prix		Nominated
British Academy Film Awards	21 February 2011	Best Supporting Actress	Lesley Manville	Nominated
British Academy Film Awards	21 February 2011	Best British Film		Nominated
British Independent Film Awards	5 December 2010	Best Director	Mike Leigh	Nominated
British Independent Film Awards	5 December 2010	Best Actress	Ruth Sheen	Nominated
British Independent Film Awards	5 December 2010	Best Actor	Jim Broadbent	Nominated
British Independent Film Awards	5 December 2010	Best Supporting Actress	Lesley Manville	Nominated
Cannes Film Festival	23 May 2010	Palme d'Or		Nominated
Chicago Film Critics Association Awards	20 December 2010	Best Actress	Lesley Manville	Nominated
Chlotrudis Society for Independent Films	21 March 2012	Best Movie		Nominated
Chlotrudis Society for Independent Films	21 March 2012	Best Director	Mike Leigh	Nominated
Chlotrudis Society for Independent Films	21 March 2012	Best Supporting Actress	Lesley Manville	Won
Chlotrudis Society for Independent Films	21 March 2012	Best Original Screenplay	Mike Leigh	Nominated
Chlotrudis Society for Independent Films	21 March 2012	Best Performance by an Ensemble Cast		Nominated
European Film Awards	4 December 2010	Best Actress	Lesley Manville	Nominated
European Film Awards	4 December 2010	Best European Composer	Gary Yershon	Nominated
London Film Critics Circle Awards	10 February 2011	Best British Actor	Jim Broadbent	Runner-up
London Film Critics Circle Awards	10 February 2011	Best British Actress	Lesley Manville	Won
London Film Critics Circle Awards	10 February 2011	Best British Actress	Ruth Sheen	Nominated
London Film Critics Circle Awards	10 February 2011	Best British Director	Mike Leigh	Runner-up
London Film Critics Circle Awards	10 February 2011	Best British Film		Runner-up
London Film Critics Circle Awards	10 February 2011	Best British Supporting Actor	David Bradley	Runner-up
London Film Critics Circle Awards	10 February 2011	Best British Supporting Actor	Peter Wight	Nominated
London Film Festival Awards	27 October 2010	Best Film		Nominated
National Board of Review Awards	2 December 2010	Top Ten Film		Won
National Board of Review Awards	2 December 2010	Best Actress	Lesley Manville	Won
San Diego Film Critics Society Awards	14 December 2010	Best Supporting Actress	Lesley Manville	Won
San Diego Film Critics Society Awards	14 December 2010	Best Ensemble Cast		Nominated
Washington D.C. Area Film Critics Association Awards	6 December 2010	Best Original Screenplay	Mike Leigh	Nominated
