= 1993 New York Film Critics Circle Awards =

59th New York Film Critics Circle Awards

59th New York Film Critics Circle Awards

January 16, 1994

Best Picture:
Schindler's List

The 59th New York Film Critics Circle Awards honored the best filmmaking of 1993. The winners were announced on 15 December 1993 and the awards were given on 16 January 1994.

== Winners ==
- Best Actor:
  - David Thewlis - Naked
  - Runners-up: Anthony Hopkins - The Remains of the Day and Shadowlands and Daniel Day-Lewis - In the Name of the Father
- Best Actress:
  - Holly Hunter - The Piano
  - Runners-up: Ashley Judd - Ruby in Paradise and Emma Thompson - The Remains of the Day
- Best Cinematography:
  - Janusz Kamiński - Schindler's List
  - Runners-up: Michael Ballhaus - The Age of Innocence and Stuart Dryburgh - The Piano
- Best Director:
  - Jane Campion - The Piano
  - Runners-up: Steven Spielberg - Schindler's List and Mike Leigh - Naked
- Best Documentary:
  - Visions of Light
  - Runners-up: The War Room and Rock Hudson's Home Movies
- Best Film:
  - Schindler's List
  - Runners-up: The Piano and Naked
- Best Foreign Language Film:
  - Farewell My Concubine (Ba wang bie ji) • China/Hong Kong
  - Runners-up: The Story of Qiu Ju (Qiu Ju da guan si) • China and Highway Patrolman (El patrullero) • Mexico
- Best Screenplay:
  - Jane Campion - The Piano
  - Runners-up: Steven Zaillian - Schindler's List and Danny Rubin and Harold Ramis - Groundhog Day
- Best Supporting Actor:
  - Ralph Fiennes - Schindler's List
  - Runners-up: Leonardo DiCaprio - What's Eating Gilbert Grape and This Boy's Life and John Malkovich - In the Line of Fire
- Best Supporting Actress:
  - Gong Li - Farewell My Concubine (Ba wang bie ji)
  - Runners-up: Rosie Perez - Fearless and Untamed Heart and Jennifer Jason Leigh - Short Cuts
