= Karina Fernandez =

British actress

Karina Fernandez is a British actress. She is best known for her performances in three of Mike Leigh's films – Another Year, Happy-Go-Lucky, and Mr. Turner. Fernandez graduated from Drama Centre London. She is an instructor at City Academy, London.

== Career ==
=== Theatre ===
Fernandez began her regular theatre work in 1997, and has since performed in several plays including Shopping and Fucking and Woody Allen's Murder Mysteries. Her Shakespearean work includes Hamlet (as Ophelia), Romeo and Juliet (as Juliet) and Macbeth (as Lady Macduff).

=== Television ===
She has appeared regularly on British television, including appearances in Twenty Twelve, My Family, The Forsyte Saga, Married Single Other and Killing Eve.

=== Film ===
Her first major film was the multiple award-winning Happy-Go-Lucky, directed by Mike Leigh, where she played a flamenco teacher from Seville with emotional problems. She gained praise as one of the Top 10 Best Performances of 2008 That You May Not Have Heard About.

She followed this up with a larger role in Another Year, also directed by Leigh. She has talked about her experiences working with Leigh in a Guardian video.

In 2014, she appeared in historical comedy-drama film Pride as Stella. She also appeared in 2014 as Miss Coggins in the biographical drama Mr. Turner and plays Dido's Lament by Henry Purcell to Turner's (Timothy Spall) singing.

=== Voice ===
Fernandez has narrated or co-narrated a number of audio books, including The Happy Home for Broken Hearts by Rowan Coleman, Want to Know a Secret? by Sue Moorcroft and The Constant Princess by Philippa Gregory.
