= Life Is Sweet (film) =

1990 film by Mike Leigh

- Theatrical release poster
- Directed by: Mike Leigh
- Written by: Mike Leigh
- Produced by: Simon Channing Williams
- Starring: Alison Steadman; Jim Broadbent; Timothy Spall; Claire Skinner; Jane Horrocks; David Thewlis; Moya Brady; Stephen Rea
- Cinematography: Dick Pope
- Edited by: Jon Gregory
- Music by: Rachel Portman
- Production company: Thin Man Films
- Distributed by: Palace Pictures
- Release dates: 11 November 1990 (London Film Festival); 22 March 1991 (United Kingdom)
- Running time: 103 minutes
- Country: United Kingdom
- Language: English
- Budget: £1 million
- Box office: $1.5 million (US) £530,000 (UK)

Life Is Sweet is a 1990 British comedy drama film directed by Mike Leigh, starring Alison Steadman, Jim Broadbent, Claire Skinner, Jane Horrocks and Timothy Spall. Leigh's third cinematic film, it was his most commercially successful title at the time of release. A tragi-comic story, it follows the fortunes of a working-class North London family over a few weeks one summer.

== Plot ==
Andy (a senior chef in a large London catering facility) impulsively buys a dilapidated fast-food van touted by a disreputable acquaintance. Andy plans to restore the van for use on a local fast-food round. Wendy, his hard-working, good-natured and innuendo-prone wife, is sceptical about the project but understands her husband's ambitions. Their non-identical twin 22-year-old daughters Natalie and Nicola have profoundly different attitudes: tomboyish Natalie thinks it is a good idea if it will make her father happy, whereas the bitter, shut-in Nicola contemptuously dismisses Andy as a "Capitalist!" Late that night, Nicola binges on chocolate and snacks, then forces herself to vomit. Natalie, awake in her adjacent bedroom and looking through US travel brochures, overhears: her reactions indicate this is something she is painfully familiar with.

Aubrey, a hyperactive but emotionally labile family friend, is opening a Parisian-themed restaurant named The Regret Rien. Wendy and Andy's initial confidence in the scheme is undermined by Aubrey's unorthodox approach to the interior décor and by his menu.

Whilst the rest of the family are out at work, Nicola's lover comes to the family home to have sex with her. It appears that Nicola only can be aroused by a combination of light bondage and the consumption of chocolate spread from her chest – a practice to which he only reluctantly agrees. Trying to engage and understand her, he ultimately loses patience with her combative attitude, concluding she is "a bit vacant" and incapable of having a sincere, adult conversation or allowing herself to enjoy his companionship. Nicola calls his bluff and loses: he leaves, and her fragile emotional state deteriorates further.

The opening night of The Regret Rien is a disaster. Volunteering her help when Aubrey's waitress has let him down, Wendy discovers that Aubrey has neglected to advertise the opening, and no customers turn up. Aubrey proceeds to get helplessly drunk, taking to the pavement and railing against the world. Wendy gets him back inside, where Aubrey blubbers that he fancies her, starts to undress and passes out. Wendy has to deal not only with him but with his glum and passive sous-chef/dogsbody Paula.

Meanwhile, Andy and Patsy have gone to their local pub, where Andy gets drunk and ends up sleeping inside the decrepit fast-food van in his driveway. Wendy returns home to find him. Unnerved by her bizarre evening, she loses her temper with the whole family.

Natalie enjoys her unconventional work as a plumber, the simple pleasures of a pint and a game of pool, and dreams of visiting the US. In contrast, Nicola becomes increasingly agitated, aggressive and reclusive, and Wendy finally confronts her. Wendy makes it clear to Nicola that she is deeply worried about her, wondering why she makes no attempt to get involved with the causes she claims to believe in. She tells Nicola of the struggle that she and Andy endured to care for their baby daughters – how it meant she never went to college and Andy working in a "job he hates". It emerges that during an earlier phase of Nicola's eating disorder, she almost starved to death. Ashamed and angry, Nicola is convinced that Wendy and the rest of the family hate her. Instead, as the exasperated Wendy tells her "We don't hate you! We love you, you stupid girl!" and leaves the room, deeply upset. Nicola breaks down sobbing.

Meanwhile, Andy is seen running his kitchen. He slips on a spoon, breaking his ankle. Wendy receives the news with a characteristic mixture of sympathy and amusement. She drives him home from the hospital; aided by Natalie she makes him comfortable, and then goes to see Nicola, still in her room. Wendy and Nicola reconcile.

Finally, Natalie and Nicola sit peacefully in the evening sunshine in the back garden. Natalie observes that Nicola must own up to her parents about her bulimia. She then asks Nicola "D'you want some money?" and Nicola accepts gratefully, the first time in the film where she has accepted an offer of help.

== Cast ==
- Alison Steadman as Wendy
- Jim Broadbent as Andy, Wendy's husband and a professional head cook in an industrial kitchen
- Claire Skinner as Natalie, a plumber and Andy and Wendy's daughter
- Jane Horrocks as Nicola, Natalie's twin sister
- Timothy Spall as Aubrey, an old friend of the family
- Stephen Rea as Patsy
- David Thewlis as Nicola's lover
- Moya Brady as Paula

== Production ==
The film was a co-production between British Screen Productions, Channel Four Films and Thin Man Films, a production company created by Mike Leigh and producer Simon Channing Williams. This was the first release by Thin Man, who have produced all Leigh's films since Life Is Sweet.

The script was developed by Leigh and the cast, employing his established practice of collectively improvising and rehearsing for several weeks before shooting. For example, Aubrey's bizarre recipes were devised by Leigh and Timothy Spall over the course of an evening, and then checked for plausibility with a professional chef, who advised them about which ones were technically impossible to prepare; all the ones that appear in the film are, as Leigh put it, "all feasible, gross as it sounds."

David Thewlis, who played Nicola's anonymous lover, was disappointed at being given such a small role. Leigh promised him that the next time he considered Thewlis for a role in a film "he'd be given a fair slice of the pie." Thewlis' next role in a Leigh film was his award-winning performance as the lead character Johnny in Naked.

The film was shot entirely on location in Enfield, UK and used local people as extras, including an Enfield-based dance school for the opening title sequence.

Alison Chitty found the house in Enfield for Life Is Sweet and fell in love with it because of its garden shed. She also found the old mobile snack-bar, which Rea's Patsy sells on to Broadbent's Andy as a pig in a poke in Northampton and painted it.

Life is Sweet's bright, primary-coloured production design contrasted with that of Leigh's next film, Naked, which was conceived in blacks and blues and a 'dark, dilapidated grunginess'.

== Release ==
The film had its world premiere on 11 November 1990 at the Lumiere cinema at the London Film Festival. It opened in the United Kingdom on 22 March 1991.

== Reception ==
=== Critical reception ===
The film received very favourable reviews, and on Rotten Tomatoes, it holds a rating of 94% from 17 reviews, with an average rating of 7.8/10. The Guardian film reviewer awarded the film seven stars out of a possible ten. Roger Ebert of the Chicago Sun-Times was full of praise, commenting that in spite of the constraints of independent film production, the film was "as funny, spontaneous and free as if it had been made on a lark by a millionaire". He added that "By the end of Life Is Sweet, we are treading close to the stuff of life itself – to the way we all struggle and make do, compromise some of our dreams and insist on the others. Watching this movie made me realize how boring and thin many movies are; how they substitute plots for the fascinations of life." Hal Hinson of The Washington Post called the film "sublime" and "gently brilliant". Desson Thompson of the same paper agreed, praising Leigh for discovering "the tragic beauty of the mundane".

David Sexton in the Times Literary Supplement was critical, however, and wrote that "the film never transcends sitcom and remains static and anecdotal, its unit the scene, not the complete story." Further, he wrote that the film is "the product of an unresolved attitude to its subject matter and in particular of an uneasy relation to questions of class." Philip French in The Observer countered this idea: "Leigh has been called patronising. The charge is false. The Noël Coward/David Lean film This Happy Breed, evoked by Leigh in several panning shots across suburban back gardens, is patronising. Coward and Lean pat their characters on the back...Leigh shakes them, hugs them, sometimes despairs over them, but never thinks that they are other than versions of ourselves."

=== Accolades ===
Year	Association	Category	Recipient(s)	Result	Ref.
1991	Los Angeles Film Critics Association	Best Supporting Actress	Jane Horrocks	Won	
1991	Taormina Film Fest	Golden Charybdis	Mike Leigh	Won	
1991	Taormina Film Fest	Golden Mask	Alison Steadman, Jim Broadbent, Claire Skinner, Jane Horrocks	Won	
1992	Bodil Awards	Best European Film	Mike Leigh	Won	
1992	Independent Spirit Awards	Best International Film	Mike Leigh	Nominated	
1992	London Film Critics' Circle	British Film of the Year	Life Is Sweet	Won	
1992	National Society of Film Critics	Best Film	Life Is Sweet	Won	
1992	National Society of Film Critics	Best Actress	Alison Steadman	Won	
1992	National Society of Film Critics	Best Supporting Actress	Jane Horrocks	Won	
1992	National Society of Film Critics	Best Director	Mike Leigh	Runner-up	
2011	20/20 Awards	Best Director	Mike Leigh	Nominated	

== Cultural references ==
Aubrey's restaurant The Regret Rien is named after the 1956 song "Non, je ne regrette rien" by Charles Dumont and Michel Vaucaire, made famous by French singer Edith Piaf. A framed black-and-white head shot of Piaf hanging on a wall is replaced by a stuffed cat's head when he shows Wendy and Andy his restaurant before its opening.

In his first appearance in the movie, Aubrey wears a San Francisco Giants Starter jacket while visiting the family's home.

Andy often speaks in comic voices, at one point uttering the out-of-context line "He's fallen in the water!". This was the catchphrase of Little Jim, a recurring character from the 1950s BBC radio comedy programme The Goon Show.

Patsy is a supporter of Tottenham Hotspur football club. According to Leigh, this was a source of some discomfort to Stephen Rea who played the character because Rea is a supporter of the team's long-term rivals Arsenal.

== Home media ==
Life Is Sweet initially was released on VHS format in the United Kingdom following its theatrical showing, with two subsequent re-releases in 1993 and 2000. It was released on DVD region 2 on 11 February 2002, with a re-release on 17 March 2008. It was made available as part of several DVD collections, including a triple feature DVD alongside Secrets & Lies and Career Girls on 30 September 2002, a double feature DVD again with Secrets & Lies, released on 3 May 2004, and "The Mike Leigh Feature Film Collection" with featured 10 of Leigh's more successful films on 7 April 2008. The film was released on Blu-ray format in the United Kingdom on 28 May 2012.

Life Is Sweet was released in the United States and Canada on DVD and Blu-ray on 28 May 2013 via The Criterion Collection. The set contains a newly restored 2K transfer with special features, including an audio commentary from Mike Leigh, an audio recording of a 1991 interview with Leigh at the National Film Theatre in London, five short films written and directed by Leigh for the television series Five-Minute Films, a new introduction by Leigh, and a booklet featuring an essay from critic David Sterritt.

The film was released in Australia on DVD region 4 on 7 July 2002 from Shock Records.

== See also ==
- BFI Top 100 British films
