= Thin Man Films =

British film production company

- Type: Production company
- Industry: Film production
- Founded: 1988
- Founder: Mike Leigh; Simon Channing Williams
- Headquarters: Greek Street, London, United Kingdom
- Key people: Mike Leigh; Georgina Lowe
- Website: Official website

Thin Man Films is a British film production company, based in London. It was founded in 1988 by director Mike Leigh and producer Simon Channing Williams to produce Mike Leigh's films. They chose the company name because both founders were the opposite of it.

Following Channing Williams' death from cancer in 2009, producer Georgina Lowe, who had assisted in the production of all Mike Leigh films since 1993, became the company's main producer, and in 2011 Mike Leigh made her his new company partner.

Thin Man films shares its offices in London's Greek Street with Potboiler Production, a production company started by Simon Channing Williams and producer Gail Egan in 2000, which produced seven films before Channing Williams died, among them Douglas McGrath's Nicholas Nickleby and Fernando Meirelles' Oscar-winning The Constant Gardener.

Gail Egan has also been involved in the production of Mike Leigh's films since 2004.

The logo is an in-credit logo, as it consists of a fat brunette white man in blue overalls and a light blue button-down shirt pointing at the company name.

== Filmography ==
- Mr. Turner (2014) – biographical film about painter J. M. W. Turner
- A Running Jump (2012) – short
- Another Year (2010)
- Happy-Go-Lucky (2008)
- Vera Drake (2004)
- All or Nothing (2002)
- Topsy-Turvy (1999)
- Career Girls (1997)
- Secrets & Lies (1996)
- Naked (1993)
- A Sense of History (1992) – short
- Life Is Sweet (1990)
