= Claire Skinner =

British actress (born 1965)

- Born: 1965 (age 60–61); Hemel Hempstead, Hertfordshire, England
- Education: London Academy of Music and Dramatic Art
- Occupation: Actress
- Years active: 1988–present
- Spouses: Charles Palmer (m. 2001; div. 2016); Hugh Dennis (m. 2022)
- Children: 2
- Claire Skinner's voice from the BBC programme Woman's Hour, 1 September 2010

Claire Skinner (born 1965) is an English actress, known in the United Kingdom for her television career, particularly playing Sue Brockman from the BBC television series Outnumbered. She is also known for her collaboration with director Mike Leigh on two of his films, Life is Sweet (1990) and Naked (1993).

== Early life ==
Claire Skinner was born and brought up in Hemel Hempstead, the youngest daughter of a shopkeeper and an Irish-born secretary, and was shy as a child. Her dream was to be an actress and she immersed herself in her ambition. She acted, neglecting school work at Cavendish School, and "barely scraped through [her] A-levels". She went on to study at the London Academy of Music and Dramatic Art and then joined the Royal Shakespeare Company.

== Career ==
Her first role was in Hanky Park, by Walter Greenwood at the Oldham Repertory Theatre, which she describes as a "really traditional start". She is best known as Clare on the British television comedy Life Begins and as Lucinda, the sous chef in the first series of Chef! alongside Lenny Henry. From 2007 to 2016, she portrayed Sue Brockman in the sitcom Outnumbered. Skinner reprised her role in a one-off special that aired at Christmas 2024. For many years, she has preferred theatre to screen roles because she has been disappointed with her TV projects ("apart from Mike Leigh's stuff"), "not just when you see the final thing, but also because it hasn't taken off."

Skinner has worked with directors including Mike Leigh – in Life Is Sweet, and Naked – Trevor Nunn, Tim Burton and Sam Mendes, but according to her, Alan Ayckbourn "was a great influence for me as he pushed me so hard, but every director you work with has a big influence in some way, they really push you."

She has made appearances in TV shows such as Lark Rise to Candleford where for two episodes she played Mrs Macey. She appeared in the 2011 Doctor Who Christmas special "The Doctor, the Widow and the Wardrobe".

In 2019, she played Sheila in A Day in the Death of Joe Egg, which ran in Trafalgar Studios in the West End from September to November.

In 2026, she completed an MA/Masters by Research postgraduate degree in Drama and Theatre at Royal Holloway, University of London.

== Personal life ==
Skinner was married to director Charles Palmer from 2001 to 2016. The couple had two sons, one born in 1999, the other born in 2002. Since 2017, she has been in a relationship with her Outnumbered co-star Hugh Dennis. In 2025, it was revealed that the couple had married in 2022.

== Filmography ==
=== Film ===
Year	Title	Role	Notes	Ref.
1989	The Rachel Papers	Gloria		
1990	Life Is Sweet	Natalie		
1993	Naked	Sandra		
1994	The Return of the Native	Thomasin Yeobright	Television film	
1995	I.D.	Marie		
1995	Clockwork Mice	Fairy		
1999	You're Dead	Jo		
1999	Sleepy Hollow	Beth Killian		
1999	The Escort	Patricia		
2001	Bridget Jones's Diary	Magda		
2003	The Booze Cruise	Leone Sewell	Television film	
2003	Eroica	Countess Josephine von Deym	Television film	
2004	Strings	Jhinna	English version	
2006	The Enlightenment	Roxanne	Short film	
2007	The Trial of Tony Blair	Nicky	Television film	
2007	You Can Choose Your Friends	Jane Arden	Television film	
2007	And When Did You Last See Your Father?	Gillian		
2012	Act of Memory	Mother	Short film	
2012	Shoot Me!	Claire	Short film	
2012	Eliminate: Archie Cookson	Camilla		
2015	Elsewhere	Jane	Short film	
2019	Isabel	Mary	Short film	
2021	Boxing Day	Caroline		
2023	The Critic	Mary Brooke		
2025	Bridget Jones: Mad About the Boy	Magda		
2025	The Trial	Dione Sinclair	Television film	

=== Television ===
Year	Show	Role	Notes	Ref.
1988	South of the Border	Laura	Episode: "Series 1, Episode 7"	
1989	Inspector Morse	Girl Pupil	Episode: "The Ghost in the Machine"	
1992	Woof!	Liz	Episode: "Badgers"	
1993	Chef!	Lucinda	Series regular; 7 episodes	
1994	Screen One	Linda	Episode: "Two Golden Balls"	
1995	Capital Lives	Alice	Episode: "In Cahoots"	
1995	Coogan's Run	Frances	Episode: "The Curator"	
1997	The Wingless Bird	Agnes Conway	Miniseries; 3 episodes	
1997	Brass Eye	Various	Recurring role; 3 episodes	
1997	A Dance to the Music of Time	Jean	Miniseries; 3 episodes	
1997–2000	The Peter Principle	Susan Harvey	Series regular; 12 episodes	
2000–2001	Second Sight	DI Catherine Tully	Series regular	
2001	Perfect Strangers	Rebecca	Miniseries; 3 episodes	
2001	Bedtime	Sarah Newcombe	Series regular; 6 episodes	
2001	Swallow	Gail Collins	Miniseries; 2 episodes	
2003	Trevor's World of Sport	Meryl	Series regular; 7 episodes	
2004	The Genius of Mozart	Nannerl Mozart	Miniseries; 3 episodes	
2004	Murphy's Law	Alice	Episode: "Go Ask Alice"	
2004–2006	Life Begins	Clare	Series regular; 15 episodes	
2005	Agatha Christie's Marple	Amy Murgatroyd	Episode: "A Murder Is Announced"	
2005	Class of '76	Dr. Kate Tremaine	Miniseries; 2 episodes	
2006	The Family Man	Natalie Simpson	Miniseries; 3 episodes	
2006–2007	Rupert Bear, Follow the Magic...	—N/a	Recurring role	
2007	Kingdom	Brenda Collins	Episode: "Series 1, Episode 5"	
2007–2024	Outnumbered	Sue Brockman	Series regular; 38 episodes	
2008	Sense and Sensibility	Fanny Dashwood	Miniseries; 3 episodes	
2008	Lark Rise to Candleford	Mrs. Macey	Recurring role; 2 episodes	
2008	Burn Up	Clare McConnell	Miniseries; 2 episodes	
2008	Agatha Christie's Poirot	Miss Rich	Episode: "Cat Among the Pigeons"	
2008	The Commander	Fiona	Guest role; 3 episodes	
2009	Trinity	Dr Angela Donne	Series regular; 8 episodes	
2010	Moving On	Mary Ann	Episode: "Skies of Glass"	
2011	Doctor Who	Madge Arwell	Episode: "The Doctor, the Widow and the Wardrobe"	
2012	Tilly and Friends	Tumpty	Recurring role	
2012	Homefront	Claire Marshbrook	Miniseries; 6 episodes	
2013	Playhouse Presents	Linda	Episode: "Mr Understood"	
2014	Silk	Sarah Stephens	Episode: "Heavy Metal"	
2015	Critical	Lorraine Rappaport	Series regular; 6 episodes	
2015	Inside No. 9	Angela	Episode: "Nana's Party"	
2015–2017	Scream Street	Various	Recurring role	
2016	Power Monkeys	Sara	Miniseries; 6 episodes	
2017	Midsomer Murders	Kitty Oswood	Episode: "Death by Persuasion"	
2018	Next of Kin	DCI Vivien Barnes	Miniseries; 6 episodes	
2018	Vanity Fair	Louisa Sedley	Miniseries; 4 episodes	
2018–2023	Hilda	Various	Series regular; 34 episodes	
2020	The Pale Horse	Yvonne Tuckerton	Miniseries; 2 episodes	
2021	Ted Lasso	Dr Rogers	Episode: "Carol of the Bells"	
2022	Kate & Koji	Amanda	Episode: "Koji’s Date"	
2022	Murder, They Hope	Kerry	Miniseries; 3 episodes	
2022–2024	McDonald & Dodds	Mary Ormond	Series regular; 6 episodes	
2023	The Chelsea Detective	Charlotte Twist	Episode: "The Reliable Witness"	
2024	Coma	Beth Henderson	Miniseries; 4 episodes	
2024	Inside No. 9	Party Guest	Episode: "Plodding On"	
2025	Riot Women	Tricia	Recurring role; 2 episodes	
2025	The Lady	June Andrews	Miniseries	

=== Radio ===
- Five Beats to the Bar by Neil d'Souza, BBC Radio 4, (2002)
- Old Harry's Game—Christmas Special by Andy Hamilton on BBC Radio 4, (2002)
- Trevor's World of Sport by Andy Hamilton on BBC Radio 4, (2005, 2006, 2007)
- Oblomov (2005)
- The Light of Knowledge by Mya Hnuang Nyo, BBC Radio 4, (2005)
- Measure for Measure by William Shakespeare, BBC Radio 4, (2005)
- Bed and Breakfast by Helen Simpson, BBC Radio 4, (2005)
- Not a Games Person, narrating Julie Myerson's play, BBC Radio 4, (2006)
- Sculptor's Daughter-Christmas, Snow, Pets and Females, and The Bays by Tove Jansson, BBC Radio 4, (2006)
- Standing Sideways, by Matt Charman, BBC Radio 4, (2006)
- Elizabeth and Her German Garden, by Elizabeth von Arnim, BBC Radio 4, (2006)
- School Runs, by Alexis Zegerman, BBC Radio 4, (2006)
- Jigsaw, by Sybille Bedford, BBC Radio 4, (2006, 2007)
- Poetry Please, reading poems by Percy Bysshe, Mary Shelley, John Donne, Gerard Manley Hopkins, Thomas Hardy, Philip Larkin, BBC Radio 4, (2007)
- Mrs. Warren's Profession, by George Bernard Shaw, BBC Radio 3, (2007)
- Bird Song BBC Radio 3, (2008)
- Don't Turn Around (radio short) by Marian Garvey, BBC Radio 4, (2008)
- Five Easy Ways with Chilli by Scarlett Thomas, BBC Radio 4, (2008)
- Lunch: A Platonic Romantic Comedy by Marcy Kahan, BBC Radio 4, (2013, 2014, 2015)
- The Father by Florian Zeller, BBC Radio 3, (2017)
- The Archers:Truth and Lies by David Payne, BBC Radio 4 (2026)

== Theatre credits ==
Year	Title	Role	Venue	Notes	Ref.
1987	The Playboy of the Western World	Sara Tansey	Oldham Coliseum Theatre, Oldham		
1989	The Revengers' Comedies	Norma / Tracey	Stephen Joseph Theatre, Scarborough		
1990	Othello	Desdemona	Stephen Joseph Theatre, Scarborough		
1990	Taking Steps	Kitty	Stephen Joseph Theatre, Scarborough		
1991	Invisible Friends	Zara	Cottesloe Theatre, London		
1992	Measure for Measure	Isabella	Young Vic, London		
1993	The Importance of Being Earnest	Cecily Cardew	Aldwych Theatre, London		
1993	Moonlight	Bridget	Almeida Theatre, London		
1995	Look Back in Anger	Alison Porter	Royal Exchange Theatre, Manchester		
1995	The Glass Menagerie	Laura Wingfield	Donmar Warehouse, London & Comedy Theatre, London		
1998	Othello	Desdemona	Lyttelton Theatre, London		
2001	The Winter's Tale	Hermione	Olivier Theatre, London		
2009	Mrs. Affleck	Rita Affleck	Dorfman Theatre, London		
2010	Deathtrap	Myra Bruhl	Noël Coward Theatre, London		
2014	Blurred Lines	Office Worker	The Shed, London		
2015	The Father	Anne	Kiln Theatre, London & Wyndham's Theatre, London		
2016	Rabbit Hole	Becca	Hampstead Theatre, London		
2017	Prism	Nicola / Katharine Hepburn	Hampstead Theatre, London		
2018	Nightfall	Jenny	Bridge Theatre, London		
2019	A Day in the Death of Joe Egg	Sheila	Trafalgar Studios, London		
2022	The Narcissist	Senator	Minerva Theatre, Chichester		

== Awards ==
- 1992 – Won – Geneva Stars de Demain Best Actress for Life Is Sweet
- 1995 – Won – Critics' Circle Theatre Award Best Actress for The Glass Menagerie
- 1995 – Won – Time Out Award for Best Performance Off West End for The Glass Menagerie
- 1996 – Nominated – Laurence Olivier Award Best Supporting Performance for The Glass Menagerie
- 2009 – Nominated – BAFTA Best Comedy Performance for Outnumbered
