= All or Nothing (film) =

2002 film by Mike Leigh

- British DVD cover
- Directed by: Mike Leigh
- Written by: Mike Leigh
- Produced by: Simon Channing Williams
- Starring: Timothy Spall; Lesley Manville
- Edited by: Lesley Walker
- Music by: Andrew Dickson
- Production companies: Thin Man Films; StudioCanal
- Distributed by: UGC Films UK
- Release dates: 17 May 2002 (Cannes); 18 October 2002
- Running time: 128 minutes
- Country: United Kingdom
- Language: English
- Budget: $9 million
- Box office: $2.8 million

All or Nothing is a 2002 British drama film written and directed by Mike Leigh and starring Timothy Spall and Lesley Manville. Like much of Leigh's work, the film is set in present-day London, and depicts three working-class families and their everyday lives.

== Synopsis ==
The film begins with a day nearing its end. Rachel, the daughter in the first family, is shown working in a nursing home. Phil, her father, is seen driving people around in his minicab. Penny, Rachel's mother, is shown working as a cashier at a Safeway store alongside Maureen, the mother in the second family. When Penny leaves work, she cycles home to find her 18-year-old son Rory in a fight with a local boy for taking his football.

Rory is a lazy, obese, ill-mannered teenager who neither goes to school nor has a job. Complications with his obesity arise when after an altercation with a gang of youths playing piggy in the middle, he runs out of breath, begins to hyperventilate and is hospitalized after suffering a heart attack.

The second family consists of Maureen, another cashier at Safeway, and her daughter Donna, a waitress at a cafe. Donna becomes pregnant by her boyfriend Jason despite being on the pill, and this leads to a heated argument among the three characters.

The third family consists of Ron, who also drives a minicab, his unemployed teenage daughter Samantha, and his wife Carol, an unemployed alcoholic. Samantha shows interest in both Jason and Craig, a taciturn young man who seems to stalk her.

== Cast ==
- Timothy Spall as Phil
- Lesley Manville as Penny
- James Corden as Rory
- Alison Garland as Rachel
- Ruth Sheen as Maureen
- Marion Bailey as Carol
- Paul Jesson as Ron
- Sam Kelly as Sid
- Kathryn Hunter as Cécile
- Sally Hawkins as Samantha
- Helen Coker as Donna
- Daniel Mays as Jason
- Ben Crompton as Craig
- Robert Wilfort as Dr. Simon Griffith
- Gary McDonald as Neville
- Dorothy Atkinson as A Silent Passenger
- Alan Williams as Drunk
- Michele Austin as Care Worker

== Film locations ==
Dungeness in Kent was used as a film location for the scene where Phil visits the coast to contemplate his problems.

== Reception ==
It was well received by critics and audiences alike, receiving an 82% fresh rating on Rotten Tomatoes, based on 92 reviews, with an average rating of 7.1/10. The critical consensus states that "All or Nothing's depiction of the working-class can be depressingly bleak, but the performances are wonderfully true to life." It has a 72/100 average on Metacritic. The film holds an average B+ grade on Yahoo! Movies.

=== Awards ===
The film won the London Film Critics Circle Award for Best British Film of the Year, and Mike Leigh was nominated for Best Director at the European Film Awards. The film was nominated for the Palme d'Or at the 2002 Cannes Film Festival.
