= Secrets & Lies (film) =

1996 British film by Mike Leigh

- British theatrical release poster
- Directed by: Mike Leigh
- Written by: Mike Leigh
- Produced by: Simon Channing Williams
- Starring: Timothy Spall; Brenda Blethyn; Phyllis Logan; Marianne Jean-Baptiste; Claire Rushbrook; Ron Cook; Lesley Manville; Elizabeth Berrington; Michele Austin; Lee Ross; Emma Amos; Hannah Davis
- Cinematography: Dick Pope
- Edited by: Jon Gregory
- Music by: Andrew Dickson
- Production companies: Thin Man Films; Ciby 2000; Channel Four Films
- Distributed by: FilmFour Distributors (United Kingdom); Ciby 2000 (France)
- Release dates: 10 May 1996 (Cannes); 24 May 1996 (United Kingdom)
- Running time: 136 minutes
- Countries: United Kingdom; France
- Language: English
- Budget: $4.5 million
- Box office: $33-50 million

Secrets & Lies is a 1996 comedy-drama film written and directed by Mike Leigh. Led by an ensemble cast consisting of many Leigh regulars, it focuses on a dysfunctional family whose relations are thrown into further chaos after Cynthia (Brenda Blethyn) is contacted by her adult daughter Hortense (Marianne Jean-Baptiste), who was put up for adoption at birth and wishes to connect with her birth mother. Timothy Spall, Phyllis Logan, and Claire Rushbrook co-star as other members of the family.

The film premiered on 10 May 1996 at the Cannes Film Festival, where it won both the Palme d'Or and the Best Actress Award (Blethyn). Upon its release, it received critical acclaim for its performances and emotional weight, and grossed $33–50 million at the box office, against a budget of $4.5 million. At the 69th Academy Awards, Secrets & Lies was nominated in five categories: Best Picture, Best Director, Best Original Screenplay, Best Actress (Blethyn), and Best Supporting Actress (Jean-Baptiste). It also received three nominations at the 54th Golden Globe Awards, winning Best Actress in a Motion Picture – Drama (Blethyn), and seven nominations at the 50th British Academy Film Awards, winning Outstanding British Film, Best Original Screenplay and Best Actress in a Leading Role (Blethyn).

== Plot ==
Hortense Cumberbatch, a black optometrist in London, embarks on a journey to trace her family history following the death of her adoptive mother. Despite warnings about potential challenges, she discovers her birth mother is Cynthia Purley, a white woman working in a cardboard box factory in South East London, near Old Kent Road. Cynthia lives with her daughter Roxanne, a street sweeper, and tensions arise in their strained relationship. Cynthia's brother Maurice, a successful photographer, lives in the suburbs with his wife Monica, who struggles with depression over her inability to have children.

Cynthia and Monica share a mutual dislike, with Monica viewing Cynthia as self-pitying and hysterical, while Cynthia sees Monica as greedy and snobbish. Maurice, caught in the middle, rarely visits Cynthia and Roxanne. However, they all anticipate celebrating Roxanne's 21st birthday. Maurice's surprise visit to Cynthia prompts an emotional breakdown, and he gives her money for house repairs, expressing a desire to host a barbecue for Roxanne's birthday.

Roxanne, unknown to Cynthia, has a boyfriend named Paul, leading to a heated argument between mother and daughter. Hortense, determined to connect with her birth mother, contacts Cynthia and eventually persuades her to meet. In a face-to-face meeting, Cynthia, unprepared for Hortense's race, denies her identity until confronted with birth documents. Cynthia, overwhelmed with shame, slowly accepts the truth, and the two begin bonding.

As Cynthia and Hortense develop a friendship, Roxanne notices her mother's newfound secrecy. Cynthia, planning to bring Hortense to Roxanne's birthday party, asks Maurice if she can bring a colleague from work. Maurice hesitates, abruptly asks if it's a man, to which Cynthia replies with derision no, just a mate from work. Maurice finally agrees. The party becomes tense, with passive-aggressive exchanges between Cynthia, Monica, and other guests.

In a moment of nervousness, while Hortense is in the toilet, Cynthia reveals to Roxanne that Hortense is her daughter, leading to disbelief and anger. Maurice intervenes, convincing Roxanne to listen, while Cynthia and Monica quarrel. Cynthia berates Monica and Maurice defends her, disclosing her infertility, and urges everyone to share their pain rather than harbour resentments.

Monica breaks down, Cynthia comforts her, and the two women reconcile with a hug. Cynthia reveals Roxanne's father was an American medical student who disappeared after a vacation encounter. When asked about Hortense's father, Cynthia cryptically replies, "Don't break my heart, darling," and then breaks down crying and Monica and Hortense comfort her. After the party, Monica expresses her love for Maurice, and Hortense visits Cynthia and Roxanne, expressing her desire for a sister. Roxanne, despite the complexities, welcomes Hortense as her half-sister.

== Cast ==
- Timothy Spall as Maurice Purley, Monica's husband and Cynthia's brother
- Phyllis Logan as Monica Purley, Maurice's wife
- Brenda Blethyn as Cynthia Rose Purley, Hortense and Roxanne's mother
- Claire Rushbrook as Roxanne Purley, Cynthia's younger daughter, who was raised by Cynthia
- Marianne Jean-Baptiste as Hortense Cumberbatch, Cynthia's biological daughter, who was adopted at birth
- Elizabeth Berrington as Jane, Maurice's assistant
- Michele Austin as Dionne, Hortense's friend
- Lee Ross as Paul, Roxanne's boyfriend
- Lesley Manville as Jenny Ford, a social worker
- Ron Cook as Stuart, the former owner of Maurice's photography business
- Emma Amos as Maurice's client with a scar on her face

Many Leigh regulars make cameo appearances in the film, most of whom serve as clients of Maurice's photography business. They include: Peter Wight as the father in a family group, Gary McDonald as a boxer, Alison Steadman (Leigh's wife at the time) as a dog owner, Liz Smith as a cat owner, Sheila Kelley as a fertile mother, Phil Davis as a man in a suit, Anthony O'Donnell as an uneasy man, Ruth Sheen as a laughing woman, and musician Mia Soteriou as a fiancée.

== Production ==
Leigh was inspired to make a film about adoption by "people close to [him] who have had adoption-related experiences." Speaking on the subject, he stated: "I wanted for years to make a film which explored this predicament in a fictitious way. I also wanted to make a film about the new generation of young black people who are moving on and getting away from the ghetto stereotypes. And these were jumping off points for a film which turns out to be an exploration of roots and identity."

As with all of Leigh's films, the performances were created through months of intensive improvisation, during which Leigh worked with the actors, individually and together, to create their characters. The emotional scene in the cafe, in which Cynthia realises she is indeed Hortense's mother, was filmed in a single uninterrupted take of just over seven minutes. It had been a common misunderstanding that Brenda Blethyn was not told before filming that Hortense was black, making her reaction in the scene more authentic, but, in a supplement on the March 2021 Criterion Collection release of the film, Leigh, in conversation with Gary Yershon, clarified that, while Blethyn did not know Marianne Jean-Baptiste would be playing her daughter when they first improvised the scene, this took place during pre-production.

The film was partly shot in Whitehouse Way, Southgate, London. Principal photography began on 29 May 1995 and finished on 12 August.

== Reception ==
=== Box office ===
Secrets & Lies grossed £1.7 million ($2.8 million) in the United Kingdom, $8.9 million in France, and $13.4 million in the United States and Canada. It grossed $29 million in other international markets, for a worldwide gross of $33–50 million.

=== Critical reception ===
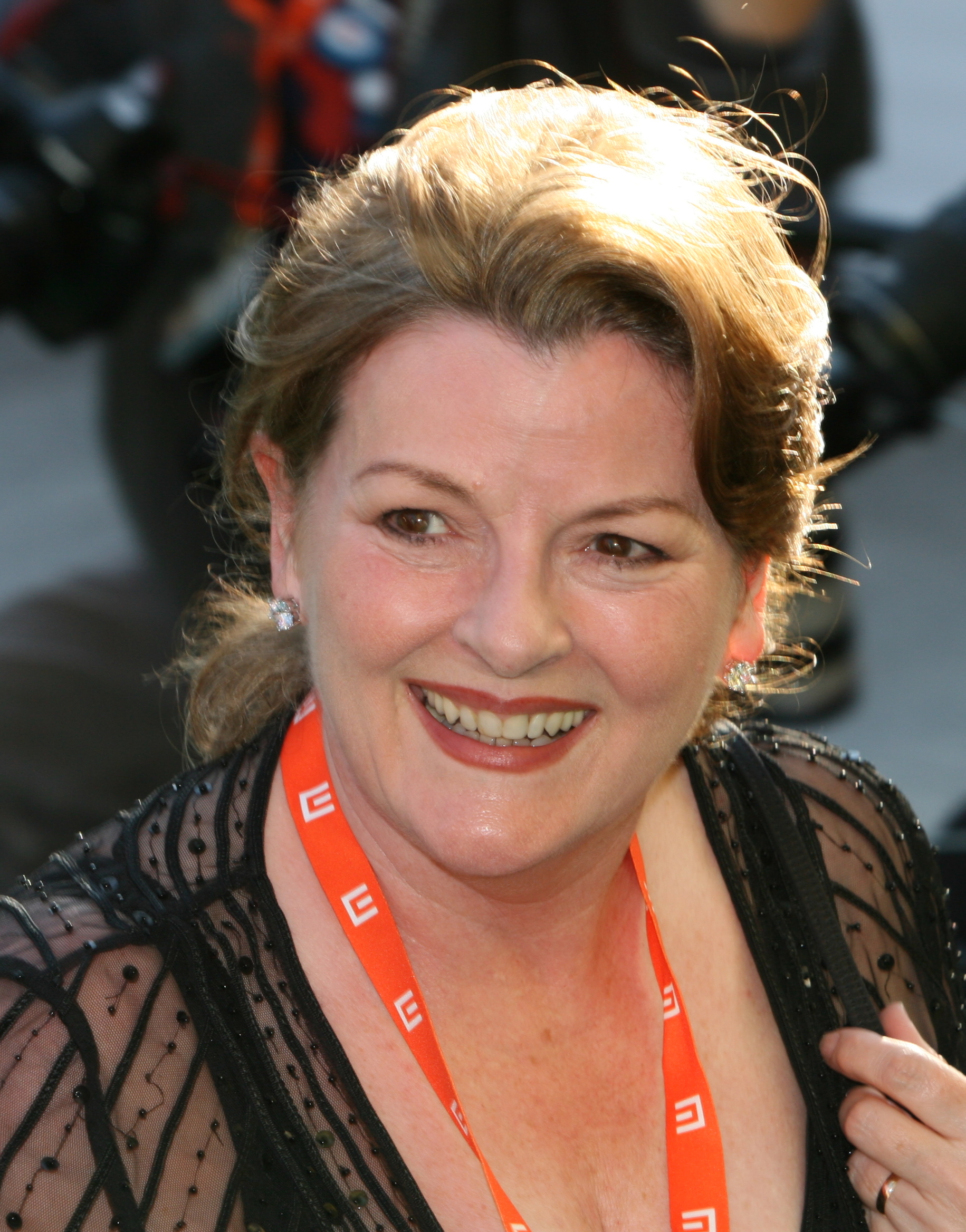
Brenda Blethyn's performance received critical acclaim, earning her the BAFTA Award for Best Actress in a Leading Role, in addition to a nomination for the Academy Award for Best Actress.

The film was released to critical acclaim. On the review aggregator website Rotten Tomatoes, 96% of 45 critics' reviews are positive, with an average rating of 8.7/10; the site's "critics consensus" reads: "Secrets & Lies delves into social issues with delicate aplomb and across-the-board incredible acting, and stands as one of writer-director Mike Leigh's most powerful works." On Metacritic, the film has a weighted average score of 91 out of 100 based on 27 reviews, indicating "universal acclaim".

Roger Ebert of the Chicago Sun-Times gave the film four out of four stars, writing that "moment after moment, scene after scene, Secrets & Lies unfolds with the fascination of eavesdropping", and adding that Leigh "finds a rhythm of life – not 'real life,' but real life as fashioned and shaped by all the art and skill his actors can bring to it – and slips into it, so that we are not particularly aware we're watching a film". He called the film "a flowering of [Leigh's] technique. It moves us on a human level, it keeps us guessing during scenes as unpredictable as life, and it shows us how ordinary people have a chance of somehow coping with their problems, which are rather ordinary, too." In 2009, Ebert added the film to his Great Movies collection.

Edward Guthmann of the San Francisco Chronicle called the film Leigh's "best and most accessible work to date", and remarked that "everyone's had these family skirmishes and confrontations in their lives, and it's remarkable to see them recorded so accurately and painfully on film. Leigh's marvelous achievement is not only in capturing emotional clarity on film, but also in illustrating the ways in which families start to heal and find a certain bravery in their efforts". Similarly, Kenneth Turan of the Los Angeles Times ranked the film among the best of the 14 features Leigh had written and directed by then, finding it "a piercingly honest, completely accessible piece of work that will go directly to the hearts of audiences who have never heard of him. If film means anything to you, if emotional truth is a quality you care about, this is an event that ought not be missed [...] Unforced, confident and completely involving, with exceptional acting aided by Dick Pope's unobtrusive camera work and John Gregory's [sic] telling editing, Secrets & Lies is filmmaking to savor."

Desson Howe of The Washington Post felt the film incorporates all the "elements of humor, sweetness, cruelty and directness" of Leigh's previous films, but is "more emotional, tear-inducing and compassionate than its predecessors", and declared it "an extended, multilayered revelation, and you don't get the full, complex picture until the final scene". His colleague Rita Kempley called the film "a magnificent melodrama that draws both tears and laughter from the everyday give-and-take of seemingly ordinary souls", and noted that "Blethyn and Jean-Baptiste are a joy to behold in tandem, but Blethyn's endearing portrait is transcendent."

In 1999, Secrets & Lies was listed as the 40th-best British film of the 20th century on a list compiled by the British Film Institute.

=== Accolades ===
Award	Date of ceremony	Category	Recipient(s)	Result	Ref(s)
AACTA Awards	1997	Best Foreign Film	Simon Channing Williams	Won	
Academy Awards	24 March 1997	Best Actress in a Leading Role	Brenda Blethyn	Nominated	
Academy Awards	24 March 1997	Best Actress in a Supporting Role	Marianne Jean-Baptiste	Nominated	
Academy Awards	24 March 1997	Best Director	Mike Leigh	Nominated	
Academy Awards	24 March 1997	Best Picture	Simon Channing Williams	Nominated	
Academy Awards	24 March 1997	Best Writing, Screenplay Written Directly for the Screen	Mike Leigh	Nominated	
British Academy Film Awards	29 April 1997	Best Actor in a Leading Role	Timothy Spall	Nominated	
British Academy Film Awards	29 April 1997	Best Actress in a Leading Role	Brenda Blethyn	Won	
British Academy Film Awards	29 April 1997	Best Actress in a Supporting Role	Marianne Jean-Baptiste	Nominated	
British Academy Film Awards	29 April 1997	Best British Film	Mike Leigh; Simon Channing Williams	Won	
British Academy Film Awards	29 April 1997	Best Direction	Mike Leigh	Nominated	
British Academy Film Awards	29 April 1997	Best Film	Mike Leigh; Simon Channing Williams	Nominated	
British Academy Film Awards	29 April 1997	Best Original Screenplay	Mike Leigh	Won	
Boston Society of Film Critics	13 December 1996	Best Actress	Brenda Blethyn	Won	
Boston Society of Film Critics	13 December 1996	Best Director	Mike Leigh	Won	
Cannes Film Festival	9–20 May 1996	Best Actress	Brenda Blethyn	Won	
Cannes Film Festival	9–20 May 1996	Palme d'Or	Mike Leigh	Won	
Cannes Film Festival	9–20 May 1996	Prize of the Ecumenical Jury	Mike Leigh	Won	
César Awards	8 February 1997	Best Foreign Film	Mike Leigh	Nominated	
Chicago Film Critics Association	10 March 1997	Best Actress	Brenda Blethyn	Nominated	
Chicago Film Critics Association	10 March 1997	Best Director	Mike Leigh	Nominated	
Chicago Film Critics Association	10 March 1997	Best Film	Secrets & Lies	Nominated	
Directors Guild of America	8 March 1997	Outstanding Directorial Achievement in Motion Pictures	Mike Leigh	Nominated	
Empire Awards	5 March 1997	Best Actress	Brenda Blethyn	Won	
European Film Awards	8 November 1996	Best Film	Simon Channing Williams	Nominated	
Florida Film Critics Circle	1996	Best Actress	Brenda Blethyn	Runner-up	
Golden Globe Awards	19 January 1997	Best Actress in a Motion Picture – Drama	Brenda Blethyn	Won	
Golden Globe Awards	19 January 1997	Best Supporting Actress – Motion Picture	Marianne Jean-Baptiste	Nominated	
Golden Globe Awards	19 January 1997	Best Motion Picture – Drama	Secrets & Lies	Nominated	
Goya Awards	25 January 1997	Best European Film	Mike Leigh	Won	
Humanitas Prize		Feature Film Category	Mike Leigh	Won	
Independent Spirit Awards	22 March 1997	Best Foreign Film	Mike Leigh	Won	
Silver Ribbon		Best Foreign Director	Mike Leigh	Won	
London Film Critics Circle	2 March 1997	Actor of the Year	Timothy Spall	Nominated	
London Film Critics Circle	2 March 1997	British Actress of the Year	Brenda Blethyn	Won	
London Film Critics Circle	2 March 1997	Director of the Year	Mike Leigh	Won	
London Film Critics Circle	2 March 1997	Film of the Year	Secrets & Lies	Won	
Los Angeles Film Critics Association	December 1996	Best Actress	Brenda Blethyn	Won	
Los Angeles Film Critics Association	December 1996	Best Director	Mike Leigh	Won	
Los Angeles Film Critics Association	December 1996	Best Film	Secrets & Lies	Won	
National Board of Review	9 December 1996	Best Film and Top Ten Films	Secrets & Lies	Won	
National Society of Film Critics	5 January 1997	Best Actress	Brenda Blethyn	Nominated	
National Society of Film Critics	5 January 1997	Best Director	Mike Leigh	Nominated	
National Society of Film Critics	5 January 1997	Best Film	Secrets & Lies	Nominated	
Satellite Awards	15 January 1997	Best Actress – Motion Picture	Brenda Blethyn	Nominated	
Satellite Awards	15 January 1997	Best Director	Mike Leigh	Nominated	
Satellite Awards	15 January 1997	Best Motion Picture – Drama	Simon Channing Williams	Nominated	
Screen Actors Guild	22 February 1997	Outstanding Performance by a Female Actor in a Leading Role	Brenda Blethyn	Nominated	
Writers Guild of America	16 March 1997	Best Original Screenplay	Mike Leigh	Nominated	

== Positive pickets ==
This film was the subject of "positive pickets" by the adult adoptee rights organisation Bastard Nation, which used it as a vehicle to raise awareness of sealed birth records in the United States and Canada.

Director Leigh and actress Blethyn met with Bastard Nation activists at a positive picket in Beverly Hills on 10 March 1997, where they were presented with Bastard Nation T-shirts.

== See also ==
- BFI Top 100 British films
