= Topsy-Turvy =

1999 British film by Mike Leigh

- Theatrical release poster
- Directed by: Mike Leigh
- Written by: Mike Leigh
- Produced by: Simon Channing Williams
- Starring: Jim Broadbent; Allan Corduner; Timothy Spall; Lesley Manville; Ron Cook
- Cinematography: Dick Pope
- Edited by: Robin Sales
- Music by: Sir Arthur Sullivan; W. S. Gilbert; Carl Davis
- Production company: Thin Man Films
- Distributed by: Pathé Distribution
- Release dates: 3 September 1999 (Venice); 18 February 2000 (United Kingdom)
- Running time: 160 minutes
- Country: United Kingdom
- Language: English
- Budget: $20 million
- Box office: $7.2 million

Topsy-Turvy is a 1999 British musical period drama film written and directed by Mike Leigh, starring Jim Broadbent as W. S. Gilbert and Allan Corduner as Sir Arthur Sullivan, along with Timothy Spall, Lesley Manville and Ron Cook. The story concerns the 15-month period in 1884 and 1885 leading up to the premiere of Gilbert and Sullivan's The Mikado. The work explores the creative conflict between playwright and composer, and depicts their decision to continue their partnership, which led to their creation of several more Savoy operas.

The film received very favourable reviews, film festival awards and two Academy Awards for design. While it is considered an artistic success as an in-depth illustration of British life in the theatre during the Victorian era, the film did not recover its production costs. Leigh cast actors who did their own singing in the film, and the singing performances were faulted by some critics, while others lauded Leigh's strategy.

== Plot ==
On the opening night of Princess Ida at the Savoy Theatre in January 1884, the composer Sir Arthur Sullivan, ill from kidney disease, is barely able to make it to the theatre to conduct. He goes on a holiday to the continent hoping that the rest will improve his health. While he is away, ticket sales and audiences at the Savoy Theatre wilt in the hot summer weather. Producer Richard D'Oyly Carte has called on Sullivan and the dramatist W. S. Gilbert to create a new piece for the Savoy, but it is not ready when Ida closes. Until a new piece can be prepared, Carte revives an earlier Gilbert and Sullivan work, The Sorcerer.

Gilbert's idea for their next opera involves a transformative magic potion, which Sullivan feels is too similar to the magic lozenge and other magic talismans used in previous operas (Note: Gilbert and Sullivan's The Sorcerer (1877) involved a magic love potion, and several of Gilbert's other works involved various magic devices that transform the possessor. See, e.g., Dulcamara, or the Little Duck and the Great Quack (1866). Gilbert later used a version of this 1884 plot suggestion in The Mountebanks.) and mechanical in its reliance on a supernatural device. Sullivan, under pressure from the British musical establishment to write more serious music, says he longs for something that is "probable", centers on "human interest", and is not dependent on magic. Gilbert sees nothing wrong with his libretto and refuses to write a new one, resulting in a standoff. The impasse is resolved after Gilbert and his wife visit a popular exhibition of Japanese arts and crafts in Knightsbridge, London. (Note: This scene in the film is anachronistic: Gilbert is shown in the film visiting the exhibition and getting inspiration for his play, but the real exhibition did not open until January 1885, long after Gilbert sent Sullivan the first plot sketch of The Mikado in May 1884.) When the katana sword he purchases there noisily falls off the wall of his study, he is inspired to write a libretto set in exotic Japan. Sullivan likes the idea and agrees to compose the music for it.

Gilbert, Sullivan and Carte work to make The Mikado a success, and many glimpses of rehearsals and stressful backstage preparations for the show follow: cast members lunch together before attempting to negotiate their salaries. Gilbert brings in Japanese girls from the exhibition to teach the ladies' chorus how to walk and use fans in the Japanese manner. The principal cast react to the fittings of their costumes designed by C. Wilhelm. The cast objects to Gilbert's proposed cut of the title character's Act Two solo, "A more humane Mikado," persuading the playwright to restore it. The actors face first-night jitters in their dressing rooms. Finally The Mikado is ready to open. As usual, Gilbert is too nervous to watch the opening performance and paces the streets. Returning to the theatre, he finds that the new opera is a resounding success.

== Cast ==
- Jim Broadbent as W. S. Gilbert
- Allan Corduner as Sir Arthur Sullivan
- Lesley Manville as Lucy "Kitty" Gilbert, Gilbert's wife
- Ron Cook as Richard D'Oyly Carte, owner of the Savoy Theatre
- Eleanor David as the American socialite Fanny Ronalds, Sullivan's mistress
- Wendy Nottingham as Helen Lenoir, Carte's indispensable business manager
- Timothy Spall as Richard Temple, who plays the Mikado
- Vincent Franklin as Rutland Barrington, who plays Pooh-Bah
- Martin Savage as George Grossmith, who plays Ko-Ko
- Dexter Fletcher as Louis, Sullivan's valet
- Dorothy Atkinson as Jessie Bond, who plays Pitti-Sing
- Shirley Henderson as Leonora Braham, who plays Yum-Yum
- Kevin McKidd as Durward Lely, who plays Nanki-Poo
- Louise Gold as Rosina Brandram, who plays Katisha
- Cathy Sara as Sybil Grey, who plays Peep-Bo
- Michael Simkins as Frederick Bovill, who plays Pish-Tush
- Andy Serkis as John D'Auban, choreographer
- Nicholas Woodeson as W. H. Seymour
- Naoko Mori as Miss "Sixpence Please", a tea seller at the Japanese Village, Knightsbridge
- Sukie Smith as Clothilde, Sullivan's maid
- Kenneth Hadley as Mr. Pidgeon, Gilbert's butler
- Kate Doherty as Mrs. Judd, Gilbert's house-keeper and cook
- Keeley Gainey as Gilbert's maid
- Charles Simon as Mr. William Gilbert, Gilbert's father
- Theresa Watson as Maude Gilbert, Gilbert's youngest sister
- Lavinia Bertram as Florence Gilbert, Gilbert's middle sister
- Eve Pearce as Mrs. Anne Gilbert, Gilbert's mother
- Ashley Jensen as Miss Tringham, a member of the chorus
- Mark Benton as Mr. Price, a member of the chorus
- Steve Speirs as Mr. Kent, a member of the chorus
- Nicholas Boulton as Mr. Conyngham, a member of the chorus
- Sam Kelly as Richard Barker, the stage manager
- Jonathan Aris as C. Wilhelm, the costume designer
- Alison Steadman as Madame Leon, the wardrobe mistress
- William Neenan as Cook, Grossmith's attendant
- Adam Searles as Shrimp, backstage messenger-boy
- Katrin Cartlidge as the madame of a Paris brothel
- Julia Rayner as Mademoiselle Fromage, a singing prostitute at the brothel
- Bríd Brennan as a mad beggar woman
- Simon Butteriss as Mr. Lewis, Grossmith's understudy

== Depiction of Victorian society ==
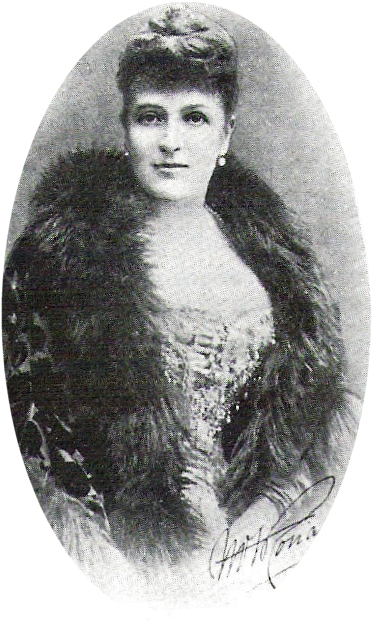
Fanny Ronalds

Film professor Wheeler Winston Dixon wrote that the film "uses the conventions of the biographical narrative film to expose the ruthlessness and insularity of the Victorian era, at the same time as it chronicles, with great fidelity, the difficulties of a working relationship in the creative arts. ... Topsy-Turvy is an investigation into the social, political, sexual and theatrical economies of the Victorian era".

While the film deals primarily with the production of The Mikado, it depicts many aspects of 1880s British life and society, some based on historical episodes. Scenes show George Grossmith's use of morphine; Leonora Braham's alcoholism and single motherhood; Jessie Bond's health issues, including an abscess on her leg that does not heal; Sullivan's visit to a French brothel (Note: There is little evidence that Sullivan ever visited a brothel; the researcher Gregory Anderson has argued that the idea is a misreading of that scant evidence.) and his relationship with his longtime mistress, Fanny Ronalds, implying that she obtains an abortion; three actors' discussion of the destruction of the British garrison at Khartoum by the Mahdi; a private salon concert; a conversation about the use of nicotine by women; and Gilbert being accosted outside the theatre on opening night by an elderly prostitute. The film also depicts the Savoy Theatre as having electric lighting; it was the first public building in Britain, and one of the first of any kind, to be lit entirely by electricity. Another scene shows an early use of the telephone. During costume fittings, the actors protest at having to perform without their corsets for the sake of accuracy.

== Production ==
Principal photography took place at 3 Mills Studios in London beginning 29 June 1998 and completed shooting on 24 October. Location shooting took place in London and Hertfordshire, and scenes which took place at the Savoy Theatre were filmed at the Richmond Theatre in Richmond, London. The film's budget was $20,000,000.

== Release ==
=== Box office ===
In the United States and Canada, the film grossed $31,387 on its opening weekend and $6,208,548 in total. In the United Kingdom, the film grossed £139,700 on its opening weekend and £610,634 ($1 million) in total.

=== Critical reception ===
The film received very positive reviews from critics. On Rotten Tomatoes, the film has a 90% "Fresh" score based on 88 reviews, with an average rating of 7.8/10. The site's consensus states: "Dressed to the nines in exquisite production value and buoyed by Mike Leigh's sardonic wit, Topsy-Turvy is rich entertainment that is as brainy as it is handsome." Metacritic reports a 90 out of 100 rating based on 31 critics, indicating "universal acclaim".

Janet Maslin of The New York Times found Topsy-Turvy "grandly entertaining", "one of those films that create a mix of erudition, pageantry and delectable acting opportunities, much as Shakespeare in Love did". She continued:

Topsy-Turvy ... is much bigger than their story. Its aspirations are thrilling in their own right. Mr. Leigh's gratifyingly long view of life in the theatre (Gilbert has a dentist who tells him Princess Ida could have been shorter) includes not only historical and biographical details but also the painstaking process of creating a Gilbert and Sullivan production from the ground up. The film details all this with the luxury of a leisurely pace, as opposed to a slow one.

Richard Schickel in Time magazine described the film as "one of the year's more beguiling surprises" and a "somewhat comic, somewhat desperate, very carefully detailed" story given "heartfelt heft" in the way it depicts how rehearsing and putting on a comic opera "takes over everyone's life". According to Philip French in The Observer, "Topsy-Turvy is not a conventional biographical film. ... [It] is an opulently mounted, warm-hearted celebration of two great artists and of a dedicated group of actors, backstage personnel and front-of-house figures working together." French also calls the film "a rare treat, thanks to Dick Pope's photography, Eve Stewart's production design and Lindy Hemming's costumes", with "great music orchestrated by Carl Davis." For Roger Ebert, it was "one of the year's best films."

Topsy-Turvy ranks 481st on Empire's 2008 list of the 500 greatest films of all time.

== Awards and honours ==
At the 72nd Academy Awards, Topsy-Turvy received the Academy Award for Best Costume Design and the Academy Award for Best Makeup, and was nominated for Best Art Direction and Best Original Screenplay.

The film also won Best Make Up/Hair at the 53rd British Academy Film Awards and was nominated for Best British Film, Best Actor in a Leading Role (Jim Broadbent), Best Supporting Actor (Timothy Spall) and Best Original Screenplay. Broadbent also won the Volpi Cup for Best Actor at the 56th Venice International Film Festival, and the film was nominated for the Golden Lion at the same festival.

Topsy-Turvy won the Best British Film Award at the Evening Standard British Film Awards, Best Film (shared with Spike Jonze's Being John Malkovich) and Best Director at the 1999 National Society of Film Critics Awards, and Best Picture and Best Director at the 1999 New York Film Critics Circle Awards.

== Home media; similar works ==
A digitally restored version of the film, released on DVD and Blu-ray by The Criterion Collection in March 2011, includes an audio commentary featuring director Leigh; a new video conversation between Leigh and musical director Gary Yershon; Leigh's 1992 short film A Sense of History, written by and starring actor Jim Broadbent; deleted scenes; and a featurette from 1999 including interviews with Leigh and cast members.

Another film treating the Gilbert and Sullivan partnership is The Story of Gilbert and Sullivan (1951), and in the short 1950 film The Return of Gilbert and Sullivan, Gilbert and Sullivan contemporarily appear to protest the jazz treatment of their operas. Stage shows about the duo include Knights of Song, which premiered in 1938 on Broadway, Dr Sullivan and Mr Gilbert (1993), and the musicals The Savoyards, by Donald Madgwick (1971); Tarantara Tarantara, by Ian Taylor (1975); and Sullivan and Gilbert, by Ken Ludwig (1983).

== See also ==
- Topsyturveydom
