= Naked (1993 film) =

1993 British film directed by Mike Leigh

- Canadian poster
- Directed by: Mike Leigh
- Written by: Mike Leigh
- Produced by: Simon Channing Williams
- Starring: David Thewlis; Katrin Cartlidge; Lesley Sharp
- Cinematography: Dick Pope
- Edited by: Jon Gregory
- Music by: Andrew Dickson
- Production company: Thin Man Films
- Distributed by: First Independent Films
- Release date: 5 November 1993
- Running time: 131 minutes
- Country: United Kingdom
- Language: English
- Budget: £2.5 million
- Box office: $2.3 million (UK/US)

Naked is a 1993 British black tragicomedy film written and directed by Mike Leigh and starring David Thewlis as Johnny, a loquacious intellectual, philosopher and conspiracy theorist. The film won several awards, including Best Director and Best Actor at the Cannes Film Festival. Naked marked a new career high for Leigh as a director and made Thewlis an internationally recognised star.

== Plot ==
In a Manchester alley, Johnny is having sex with a woman, who initially encourages him but then protests that he is hurting her, pushes him away, and runs off vowing that "her Bernard" will get vengeance on him for this. Johnny grabs his things from his apartment, steals a car, and flees to Dalston, a "scrawny, unpretentious area" in east London. He seeks refuge at the home of Louise, a former girlfriend from Manchester, who is not happy to see him. Louise works as a file clerk and lives with two flatmates, the unemployed Sophie, whom she calls her "hippy-dippy friend", and the primary tenant Sandra, a nurse who is away in Zimbabwe.

Johnny seduces Sophie while treating Louise coldly, but soon tires of her. He leaves and walks around central London, expounding his worldview at length to anyone who will listen. Among the people he meets are Archie, a young Scottish man looking for his girlfriend Maggie on Brewer Street, and Brian, a security guard who looks after an empty office building at night, which Johnny calls "the most tedious job in England", while planning to move to a seaside cottage. At one point, Brian and Johnny look across the way at a scantily clad woman standing by her unshaded window.

After pursuing the woman they saw through the window and rejecting her after he notices a skull and crossbones tattoo on her shoulder, Johnny follows a young cafe worker home, but she grows upset and throws him out. He hitches a ride with a man hanging posters around town until the man, exasperated by Johnny's nonstop haranguing, knees him in the groin, and, once Johnny is curled on the pavement, kicks him again before driving off with Johnny's duffel bag containing his clothes and books. Johnny wanders the streets and is severely beaten by a wandering gang of thugs.

Meanwhile at Louise's residence, Jeremy (a.k.a. Sebastian), claiming to be the landlord, lets himself in, rapes Sophie, and tosses several hundred pounds at her for "services rendered". Louise returns, realizes that Sophie is traumatised and vainly tries to get Jeremy out of the house. When Johnny, in awful shape, reaches the house, the two women try to keep him quiet, but he has a fit that wakes the sleeping Jeremy.

Sandra returns early from her trip. Though horrified by the state of the apartment, she tends to Johnny's injuries. Jeremy departs after being threatened by Louise. Johnny makes clear that he has no time for Sophie who, desolate and rejected, flees the house with her few possessions. Louise and Johnny seemingly reconcile and discuss returning to Manchester together, but once she leaves for work, Johnny takes the money Jeremy tossed at Sophie and hobbles out into the streets.

== Cast ==
- David Thewlis as Johnny Fletcher
- Lesley Sharp as Louise Clancy
- Katrin Cartlidge as Sophie
- Greg Cruttwell as Jeremy G. Smart/Sebastian Hawk
- Claire Skinner as Sandra
- Peter Wight as Brian
- Ewen Bremner as Archie
- Susan Vidler as Maggie
- Gina McKee as the Cafe Girl
- Elizabeth Berrington as Giselle
- Darren Tunstall as the Poster Man

== Production ==
=== Background and development ===
Leigh first had the idea for the story while a student in Manchester in the early 1960s: "We had a very enlightened teacher who endlessly reminded us that the next total eclipse would be in August 1999. Later I started thinking about the millennium and the end of the world. In 1992 the millennium was impending, so I brought that idea to the film."

In 1965, Leigh had teamed up with David Halliwell, hired the Unity Theatre for a fortnight, and directed the first production of Halliwell's Little Malcolm and His Struggle Against the Eunuchs. According to theatre critic Michael Coveney, "Malcolm Scrawdyke is clearly a precursor of Johnny in Naked. Scrawdyke was a loutish art student and absurd ideologue from Huddersfield who had trouble with girls and a hatred for his teachers...the play shared a deeply felt schoolboy coarseness with Alfred Jarry's Ubu Roi, a piece originally written as a vicious attack on a loathed mathematics master."

=== Principal photography ===
Leigh's method, as in all his character dramas, consisted of elaborate improvisational rehearsals with the cast to develop the characters' background stories and traits. The actors interacted with the outside world and each other while in character until Leigh told them to come out of character and be themselves. The dialogue produced from these interactions was then edited, or "distilled", to form the script, based on a minimal plot outline by Leigh. The cast was not allowed to discuss their characters with one another outside of rehearsals, as Leigh, for realism, would rather they meet and interact as they would in real life. Thewlis's background reading for the part of Johnny included Voltaire's Candide, the teachings of the Buddha and James Gleick's Chaos, as well as the Bible and the Qur'an.

After weeks of improvisation, filming took place in London from 9 September to 16 December 1992. Sandra's Neo-Gothic home was an actual interior/exterior location that Leigh featured heavily, particularly in the last shot of the film, as its corner location allowed for wide street views.

The scenes between Johnny and Brian the security guard came from an eight-hour improvisation. The uncut shot of Johnny and Brian in silhouette, where Johnny expounds on his convoluted apocalyptic conspiracy theory, had 26 takes, but Leigh ended up using one of the earliest. The film's dialogue has a loose, improvisational quality but, according to Thewlis, the only improvisation filmed on location was the scene of Johnny meeting and antagonising the poster man.

The song sung by Johnny and Louise near the film's end, "Take me back to Manchester when it's raining", was one Leigh used to sing with his friends in Habonim ("the Builders"), the international socialist Jewish youth movement he joined as a schoolboy. After the film was released, Leigh heard from a retired schoolmaster at Stand Grammar in Whitefield, Greater Manchester, who had written the song for a school revue in 1950.

=== Themes ===
The film is dark, monochromatic and claustrophobic, with subtle visual references to film noir and Alfred Hitchcock. Many shots are in stairwells and in borrowed flats whose tenants are hostile toward or unaware of the decor, making them seem disconnected from cultural touchstones and their place in their homes. Alienation, sexual violence and misogyny, addiction and depression are touched upon as Johnny meets various rootless individuals who work in dead-end jobs or are unemployed.

Intelligent, educated and eloquent, Johnny is also deeply embittered and egotistical. He tends to dominate conversations with his aggressive intellectualism and theories about modern culture. His tactics are based on a particular form of intellectual bullying, directed at strangers and intimate partners alike, and summed up in domineering, scholastic barrages drawn from eclectic sources. His overall behaviour is reckless, self-destructive, and at times borderline sadistic, and he shows a penchant for aggressive sexual domination at least twice in the film.

Biographer Sheridan Morley described Johnny as "Alfie in the grips of Thatcherite depression"—thus, according to critic Michael Coveney, "cross fertilising Bill Naughton's chirpy cockney Lothario, immortalised by Michael Caine, with the dark sinister disaffection of the new underclass—a neat way of indicating that the Swinging Sixties had degenerated into the nauseated Nineties." Coveney said that Leigh had captured something of the anxiety, rootless cynicism, and big-city disaffection of the time.

Ben Myers, in a Guardian article calling Naked Mike Leigh's "finest work" and "the best British film in recent history", elaborated on the many theories filmgoers have had on whom Johnny might represent: "a modern, albeit highly flawed, Jesus attempting to change people's lives. Or perhaps he's the devil himself. Others have suggested it is a post-AIDS morality movie, or a classic urban existentialist tale."

Critics have suggested comparisons with William Shakespeare's Hamlet and Jean Renoir's Boudu Saved from Drowning (one of Leigh's favourite films). Hamlet talks "incessantly to the audience [...] assuming a dominance over other characters through expressions of mania, and rapid, witty speech. Thewlis, [...] wrapped like Hamlet in a black and inky coat, [is similarly] socially untethered but burdened with useless knowledge and a vicious, bullying line in repartee." Of the precedent of "idiosyncratic, character-driven film-making" in Boudu, Coveney said: "Both Naked and Boudu explore the tension between the domesticated and the anarchic (this is a central theme, probably the theme running through Leigh's work), and focus this tension in the tragicomedy of a central character."

== Reception ==
The film generated mostly positive reviews from critics. Review aggregator Rotten Tomatoes gives the film an 89% "fresh" rating based on reviews from 61 critics, with an average score of 8.30/10 and the consensus: "Naked lives up to its title with a thoroughly committed performance from David Thewlis that's backed up with some of Mike Leigh's most powerful direction." Metacritic, another review aggregator, assigned the film a weighted average score of 84 (out of 100) based on 20 reviews from mainstream critics, considered to be "universal acclaim".

Derek Malcolm of The Guardian noted that the film "is certainly Leigh's most striking piece of cinema to date" and that "it tries to articulate what is wrong with the society that Mrs Thatcher claims does not exist." Of Johnny, he writes: "He likes no one, least of all himself, and he dislikes women even more than men, relapsing into sexual violence as his misogyny takes hold. He is perhaps redeemable, but only just. And not by any woman in our immediate view." He praised the directing and performances, singling out Thewlis, writing that he "plays [Johnny] with a baleful brilliance that is certain to make this underrated, but consistently striking, actor into a star name ... [Johnny] is, at his worst, a cold, desperate fish. His redeeming feature is that he still cares."

Roger Ebert of the Chicago Sun-Times gave the film four out of four stars and analysed the message behind the title, saying it "describes characters who exist in the world without the usual layers of protection. They are clothed, but not warmly or cheerfully. But they are naked of families, relationships, homes, values and, in most cases, jobs. They exist in modern Britain with few possessions except their words." He praised the directing, writing: "[Leigh's] method has created in Naked a group of characters who could not possibly have emerged from a conventional screenplay; this is the kind of film that is beyond imagining, and only observation could have created it." He concluded: "This is a painful movie to watch. But it is also exhilarating, as all good movies are, because we are watching the director and actors venturing beyond any conventional idea of what a modern movie can be about. Here there is no plot, no characters to identify with, no hope. But there is care: The filmmakers care enough about these people to observe them very closely, to note how they look and sound and what they feel."

Julie Burchill attacked the film in The Sunday Times, saying that Leigh's characters talked like lobotomised Muppets: "sub-wittily, the way Diane Arbus's subjects look." And Suzanne Moore in The Guardian criticised the lethargic females whose lives Johnny routinely ruins: "What sort of realism is this? To show a misogynist and surround him with such walking doormats has the effect, intentional or not, of justifying this behaviour." Lesley Sharp responded: "There are a lot of people who don't go to art house cinemas who do have deeply troubled lives and are at risk ... We do actually live in a misogynistic, violent society and there are a lot of women in abusive relationships who find it very difficult to get out of them. And a lot of men, too." Coveney wrote in the film's defence: "Is there no room for irony, for the idea that in depicting horror in the sex war an artist is exposing them, not endorsing them? And who says that Sophie is an unwilling doormat or that Louise is a doormat at all? It is clear that the latter is taking serious stock of her relationship with Johnny. She exhibits both patience and tenderness in her dealings with him, whereas she finally pulls a knife on Jeremy."

=== Box office ===
The film opened in the UK on 22 screens on 5 November 1993 and grossed £52,279 for the weekend for 16th position at the UK box office. It went on to gross £326,693. In the United States and Canada it grossed $1,769,305. In 2021, it was reissued in the UK, where it grossed $27,890.

=== Accolades ===
| Award | Date of ceremony | Category | Recipient(s) | Result | Ref. |
|---|---|---|---|---|---|
| BAFTA Awards | 15 April 1994 | Outstanding British Film | Naked | Nominated | |
| Cannes Film Festival | 24 May 1993 | Best Actor | David Thewlis | Won | |
| Cannes Film Festival | 24 May 1993 | Best Director | Mike Leigh | Won | |
| Cannes Film Festival | 24 May 1993 | Palme d'Or | Naked | Nominated | |
| Chicago International Film Festival | 24 October 1993 | Best Feature | Naked | Nominated | |
| Cinéfest Sudbury International Film Festival | 1993 | Best International Film | Naked | Won | |
| Toronto International Film Festival | 18 September 1993 | Metro Media Award | Naked | Won | |
| Belgian Film Critics Association | 1994 | Grand Prix | Naked | Nominated | |
| Evening Standard British Film Awards | 1994 | Best Actor | David Thewlis | Won | |
| Independent Spirit Awards | 19 March 1994 | Best Foreign Film | Naked | Nominated | |
| London Film Critics' Circle | 1994 | British Actor of the Year | David Thewlis | Won | |
| National Society of Film Critics | 3 January 1994 | Best Actor | David Thewlis | Won | |
| New York Film Critics Circle | 16 January 1994 | Best Actor | David Thewlis | Won | |
| New York Film Critics Circle | 16 January 1994 | Best Director | Mike Leigh | 3rd place | |
| New York Film Critics Circle | 16 January 1994 | Best Film | Naked | 3rd place | |
| Village Voice Film Poll | 1999 | Best Film of the Decade | Naked | 7th place | |

Year-end lists

- Top 7 (not ranked) – Duane Dudek, Milwaukee Sentinel
- Best "sleepers" (not ranked) – Dennis King, Tulsa World
