= Simon Channing Williams =

British film producer (1945–2009)

- Born: Simon Channing Williams; 10 June 1945; Berkshire, England
- Died: 11 April 2009 (aged 63); Cornwall, England

Simon Channing Williams (10 June 1945 – 11 April 2009) was a British film producer. After having worked as a production assistant and producer of TV films and TV series in the 1970s and early 1980s, he and Mike Leigh formed the film production company Thin Man Films in 1988. This company has produced all of Mike Leigh's films since then, among them the double Oscar-winning Topsy-Turvy, the Oscar-nominated Vera Drake and the Palme d'Or-winning Secrets & Lies.

In addition to his collaborations with Mike Leigh, he also produced other films, including teen suicide drama New Year's Day (2001 film) in 1999. He co-produced Nick Love's first film Goodbye Charlie Bright in 2000, and the same year he formed Potboiler Productions with producer Gail Egan (who also works closely with Mike Leigh and has been involved in the production of several of his films). Through Potboiler Productions Channing Williams produced Douglas McGrath's Nicholas Nickleby and Fernando Meirelles' Oscar-winning The Constant Gardener.

Channing Williams died aged 63, in Cornwall on 11 April 2009, five years after being diagnosed with cancer. Leigh paid tribute saying "His great phrase was 'let's just get on with things' and right almost to the last he was still working. He was a very extraordinary big man and he will be missed universally." Leigh dedicated his 2010 film Another Year to the memory of Simon Channing Williams.

Following Channing Williams' death, Mike Leigh started to collaborate with producer Georgina Lowe, who in 2011 took over Channing Williams' half of Thin Man Films.

A Most Wanted Man was dedicated to both Philip Seymour Hoffman and Simon Channing Williams in the closing credits.
