= Vera Drake =

- Theatrical release poster
- Directed by: Mike Leigh
- Written by: Mike Leigh
- Produced by: Simon Channing Williams
- Starring: Imelda Staunton; Eddie Marsan; Daniel Mays; Phil Davis
- Cinematography: Dick Pope
- Edited by: Jim Clark
- Music by: Andrew Dickson
- Production company: Thin Man Films
- Distributed by: Momentum Pictures
- Release date: 6 September 2004 (Venice)
- Running time: 125 minutes
- Countries: United Kingdom; United States; France
- Language: English
- Budget: $11 million
- Box office: $13.3 million

Vera Drake is a 2004 period drama film written and directed by Mike Leigh and starring Imelda Staunton, Phil Davis, Daniel Mays and Eddie Marsan. It tells the story of a working-class woman in London in 1950 who performs illegal abortions.

The film was acclaimed, winning the Golden Lion at the Venice Film Festival and three BAFTA Awards. At the Academy Awards, it was nominated for Best Actress for Staunton, and Best Director and Best Original Screenplay for Leigh.

== Plot ==
Vera Drake is devoted to her family, looking after her husband and children, her elderly mother, and a sick neighbour. Her shy daughter, Ethel, works in a lightbulb factory, and her son, Sid, tailors men's suits. Her husband, Stanley, is a car mechanic. Although Vera and her family are poor, their strong family bonds hold them together. During her working day as a house cleaner, Vera performs constant small acts of kindness for the many people she encounters, being eager to help others.

Unknown to her family, Vera secretly provides abortions for young women. She receives no money for providing this service because she believes that her help is an act of charity to women in trouble. However, her partner Lily, who also carries on a black-market trade in scarce postwar foodstuffs, charges two guineas (two pounds and two shillings: equivalent to £59 in 2025) for arranging the abortions, without Vera's knowledge.

The film contains a subplot about an upper-class young woman, Susan, the daughter of one of Vera's employers. Susan is raped by a suitor, becomes pregnant, and asks a friend to put her in contact with a doctor, through whom she can obtain an abortion. The doctor refers her to a psychiatrist, who prompts her to answer questions in a certain way, so that he can legally recommend an abortion on therapeutic psychiatric grounds: that she has a family history of mental illness and that she may commit suicide if not allowed to terminate the pregnancy. The procedure costs Lily 100 guineas (£105), although the psychiatric quoted her £150.

Vera performs an abortion for a young woman named Pamela, whose mother recognises Vera. After Pamela nearly dies and is hospitalised, the surgeon tells her mother that it is a police matter, but Pamela's mother refuses to tell the police so the surgeon has to inform them. Vera is arrested at her daughter's engagement meal, and is taken into custody for questioning. She is held overnight and appears before a magistrate the next morning. Sid is shocked by his mother's secret activities and tells his father that he does not think that he can forgive her. In a later conversation with Vera, Sid expresses fear for what could happen to her in prison, before telling Vera that he loves her.

Vera is bailed to appear at the Old Bailey. None of Vera's employers will give her a character reference. Her solicitor thinks she will receive the minimum sentence of 18 months in jail; the judge sentences her to two-and-a-half years' imprisonment "as a deterrent to others". This affects all the people who previously depended on Vera's kindness.

While in prison, Vera meets others who have been convicted of performing illegal abortions. They discuss their sentences, explaining that it is not their first time in prison for performing illegal abortions, and that she will probably only serve half her sentence. Vera tearfully leaves to go to her cell.

== Main cast ==
- Imelda Staunton as Vera Drake
- Phil Davis as Stan Drake
- Daniel Mays as Sid Drake
- Alex Kelly as Ethel Drake
- Sandra Voe as Vera's Mother
- Eddie Marsan as Reg
- Adrian Scarborough as Frank Drake
- Heather Craney as Joyce Drake
- Sally Hawkins as Susan Wells
- Ruth Sheen as Lily
- Lesley Sharp as Jessie Barnes
- Sam Troughton as David
- Anna Keaveney as Nellie
- Leo Bill as Ronnie
- Gerard Monaco as Kenny
- Liz White as Pamela Barnes
- Peter Wight as Det. Inspector Webster
- Martin Savage as Det. Sergeant Vickers
- Jim Broadbent as Judge
- Simon Chandler as Mr. Wells
- Lesley Manville as Mrs. Wells
- Marion Bailey as Mrs. Fowler
- Anthony O'Donnell as Mr. Sharp

Appearing in the film in various unnamed minor roles are Chris O'Dowd, Sinead Matthews, Tilly Vosburgh, Alan Williams, Nina Fry, Elizabeth Berrington, Emma Amos, Fenella Woolgar, Nicky Henson, Allan Corduner, Vinette Robinson, Rosie Cavaliero, Tom Ellis, Jake Wood, Vincent Franklin, Paul Jesson, Jeffry Wickham, Nicholas Jones, and Eileen Davies.

== Background ==
In Vera Drake, Leigh incorporated elements of his own childhood. He grew up in north Salford, Lancashire, and experienced a very ordinary but socio-economically mixed life as the son of a doctor and a midwife. In the book The Cinema of Mike Leigh: A Sense of the Real, Leigh said, "I lived in this particular kind of working-class district with some relations living in slightly leafier districts up the road. So there was always a tension, or at least a duality: those two worlds were forever colliding. So you constantly get the one world and its relationship with the other going on in my films."

== Production ==
Mike Leigh is known to use unusual methods to achieve realism in his films. "Leigh's actors literally have to find their characters through improvisation and research the ways people in specific communities speak and behave. Leigh and his cast immerse themselves in the local life before creating the story". Critic Roger Ebert explains:

His method is to gather a cast for weeks or months of improvisation in which they create and explore their characters. I don't think the technique has ever worked better than here; the family life in those cramped little rooms is so palpably real that as the others wait around the dining table while Vera speaks to policeman behind the kitchen door, I felt as if I were waiting there with them. It's not that we 'identify' so much as that the film quietly and firmly includes us.

Leigh often uses improvisation to capture his actors' unscripted emotions. When filming Vera Drake, only Imelda Staunton knew ahead of time that the subject of the film was abortion. None of the cast members playing the family members, including Staunton, knew that Vera was to be arrested until the moment the actors playing the police knocked on the door of the house they were using for rehearsals. Their genuine reactions of shock and confusion provided the raw material for their dialogue and actions.

In addition to these methods utilised by Mike Leigh, the director is also admired for his preference of English actors to Hollywood stars. This has led to criticism of Leigh as being a patroniser of the working class. However, using Dickens in his defence, he rebuts these accusations outright proclaiming that the last thing he seeks in his actors is a stereotype. This stereotype was fiercely criticised in the film, Vera Drake:

These abiding quibbles aside, Vera Drake is a compelling and complex film. Though much has been made of the controversial subject matter—back street abortion—its main theme is the buried family secret, the ticking time bomb that can lurk underneath even the most stable marriage. Much of the film's cumulative power lies in its delineation of a rock solid family suddenly rocked to the core by a revelation that is literally beyond their comprehension: the fact that their beloved, and loving, mother is an abortionist. Why, I ask Leigh, does she keep her secret for so long?

Leigh wanted to shoot in 35mm but, after being denied by the producers, the film was shot on 16mm film stock.

== Reception ==
=== Box office ===
As of 9 April 2006, Vera Drake had grossed $12,941,817 at the box office worldwide, including over $3.7 million in the US. As of 29 July 2026, it had grossed $13,267,869 worldwide.

=== Critical response ===
Review aggregator Rotten Tomatoes gives the film an approval rating of 93% based on 160 reviews. The site's consensus reads, "With a piercingly powerful performance by Imelda Staunton, Vera Drake brings teeming humanity to the controversial subject of abortion." The website Metacritic, which compiles and averages reviews from leading film critics, gave it a score of 83 out of 100 from 40 reviews, indicating "universal acclaim".

The film has attracted some criticism from those who worked in midwifery during the 1950s. The chief concern is the method of abortion used by Vera Drake in the film. This involves using a Higginson bulb, which is a type of enema syringe, to introduce a warm, dilute solution of carbolic soap and an unspecified liquid disinfectant into the woman's uterus. This method is claimed by Jennifer Worth, a nurse and midwife in the 1950s and 1960s and author of the book Call the Midwife, to be invariably fatal. She called the film itself "dangerous", as it could be shown in countries where abortion is illegal and the method depicted copied by desperate women. In reply Leigh told interviewer Amy Raphael:

There was a ludicrous and offensive assertion from a retired mid-wife – in the Guardian no less – that the method shown in the film was implausible and would simply have killed a person. No one could walk around with all that liquid inside them. Well, any number of obstetricians and gynaecologists, some of whom I know, were outraged by those comments.

Quite apart from the fact that the procedure we showed was the most common in use, the assertion that everybody would have been infected and died was simply not true. But there was a risk of infection, which is why somebody gets infected in the film. We happened to show a back-street abortionist who chose to visit women where they were – be it at home or at a friend's place – to set up the device, do the job and clear off. But plenty of girls actually went round to the abortionist's house, then got on the bus and went home, which makes a nonsense of the thing of not being able to walk about.

Unfortunately, I was stupidly so incensed that I couldn't be bothered to respond. That was a big mistake: the story just proliferated and other journalists picked up on it.

== Home media ==
Vera Drake was released on DVD on 29 March 2005.

== Awards and nominations ==
- 2004 European Film Awards – won Best Actress and nominated for Best Film
- 2004 Venice Film Festival – won Golden Lion for Best Film & Volpi Cup for Best Actress
- 2004 Camerimage – won Golden Frog for Best Cinematography
- 2004 British Independent Film Awards – won Best British Independent Film, Best Director, Best Actor, Best Actress, Best Supporting Actor/Actress, Best Achievement in Production
- 2004 London Film Critics Circle Awards – won British Film of the Year, British Director of the Year, British Screenwriter of the Year, Actress of the Year, British Supporting Actor of the Year
- 2005 Golden Globes – nominated for Best Actress – Motion Picture Drama
- 2005 BAFTAs – won Best Director, Best Actress in a Leading Role and Best Costume Design. Nominated for Best Film, Best British Film, Best Supporting Actor, Best Supporting Actress, Best Screenplay – Original, Best Editing, Best Production Design, and Best Makeup/Hair
- 2005 Academy Awards – nominated for Best Director, Best Actress, Best Original Screenplay

== See also ==
- Abortion in the United Kingdom
