= Mike Leigh =

English writer and director (born 1943)

Mike Leigh OBE FRSL
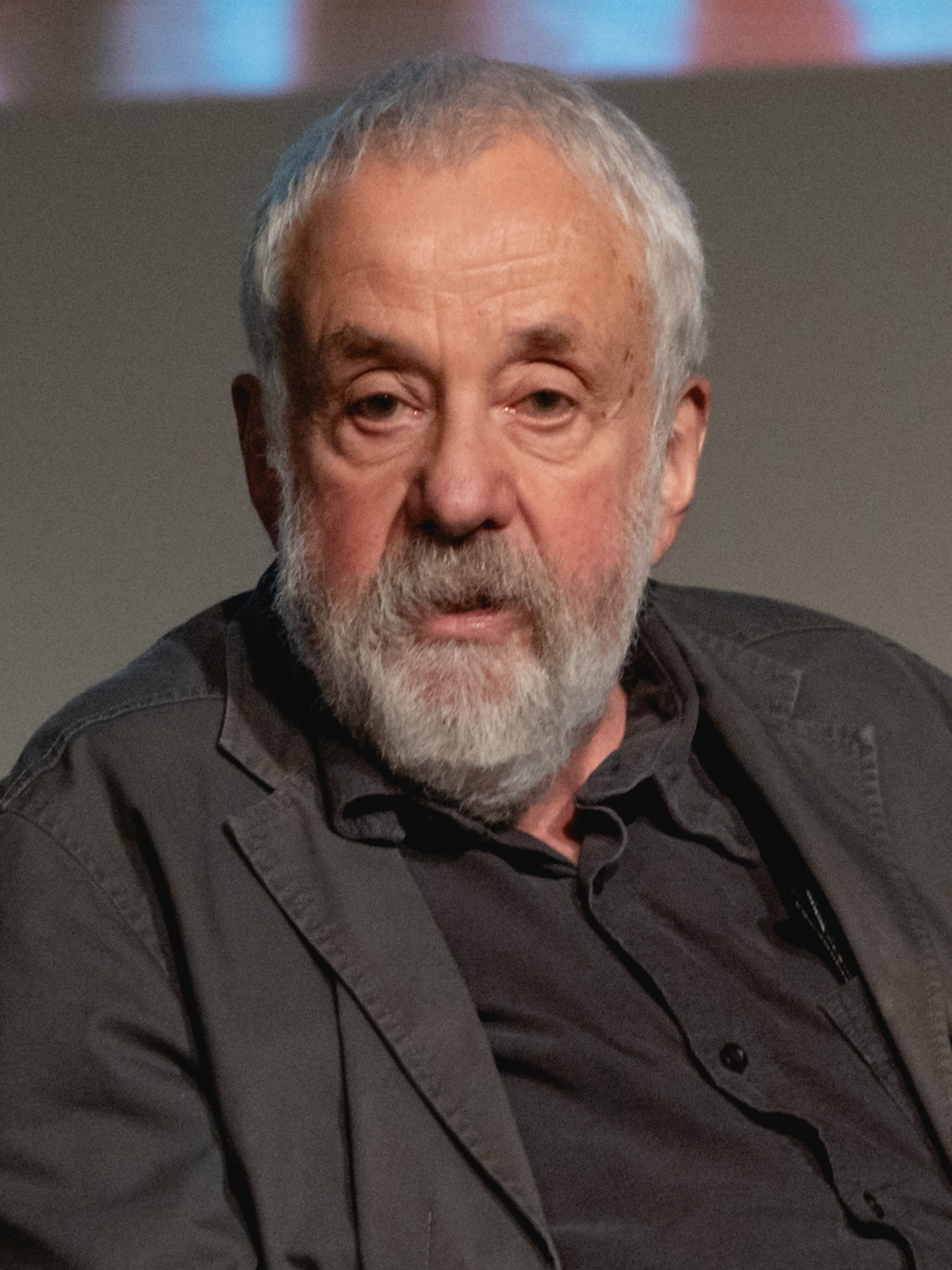
- Leigh in 2021
- Born: 20 February 1943 (age 83); Welwyn Garden City, Hertfordshire, England
- Education: Royal Academy of Dramatic Art; Camberwell School of Art and Design; Central School of Art and Design; London Film School
- Occupations: Director, screenwriter, producer, actor
- Years active: 1963–present
- Spouse: Alison Steadman (m. 1973; div. 2001)
- Children: 2
- Mike Leigh's voice discussing High Hopes, from the BBC programme The Film Programme, 30 August 2007

Mike Leigh (born 20 February 1943) is an English screenwriter, producer, director and former actor with a film, theatre, and television career spanning more than 60 years. His accolades include prizes at the Cannes Film Festival, the Berlin International Film Festival, and the Venice International Film Festival, three BAFTA Awards, and nominations for seven Academy Awards. He also received the BAFTA Fellowship in 2014, and was appointed an Officer of the Order of the British Empire (OBE) in the 1993 Birthday Honours for services to the film industry.

Leigh studied at the Royal Academy of Dramatic Art (RADA), the Camberwell School of Art, the Central School of Art and Design and the London School of Film Technique. His short-lived acting career included the role of a mute in the 1963 Maigret episode "The Flemish Shop". He began working as a theatre director and playwright in the mid-1960s, before transitioning to making televised plays and films for BBC Television in the 1970s and '80s. Leigh is known for his lengthy rehearsal and improvisation techniques with actors to build characters and narrative for his films. His purpose is to capture reality and present "emotional, subjective, intuitive, instinctive, vulnerable films".

Leigh's early films include Bleak Moments (1971), Meantime (1983), Life Is Sweet (1990), and Naked (1993). He received Academy Award nominations for Best Director and Best Original Screenplay for Secrets & Lies (1996) and Vera Drake (2004). He received further Academy Award nominations for Topsy-Turvy (1999), Happy-Go-Lucky (2008), and Another Year (2010). Other notable films include All or Nothing (2002), Mr. Turner (2014), Peterloo (2018), and Hard Truths (2024). His stage plays include Smelling A Rat, It's a Great Big Shame, Greek Tragedy, Goose-Pimples, Ecstasy and Abigail's Party.

== Early life and education ==
Leigh was born on 20 February 1943 to Phyllis Pauline (née Cousin) and Alfred Abraham Leigh, a doctor. Leigh was born at Brocket Hall in Welwyn Garden City, Hertfordshire, at the time a maternity home. His mother, in her confinement, went to stay with her parents in Hertfordshire for comfort and support while her husband was serving as a captain in the Royal Army Medical Corps. Leigh was brought up in the Broughton area of Salford, Lancashire. He attended North Grecian Street Junior School. He is from a Jewish family; his paternal grandparents were Russian-Jewish immigrants who settled in Manchester. The family name, originally Lieberman, was anglicised in 1939 "for obvious reasons". When the war ended, Leigh's father began his career as a general practitioner in Higher Broughton, "the epicentre of Leigh's youngest years and the area memorialised in Hard Labour." Leigh went to Salford Grammar School, as did the director Les Blair, his friend, who produced Leigh's first feature film, Bleak Moments (1971). There was a strong tradition of drama in the all-boys school, and an English master, Mr Nutter, supplied the library with newly published plays.

Outside school, Leigh thrived in the Manchester branch of Labour Zionist youth movement Habonim. In the late 1950s, he attended summer camps and winter activities over the Christmas break all round the country. During this time the most important part of his artistic consumption was cinema, although this was supplemented by his discovery of Picasso, Surrealism, The Goon Show, and even family visits to the Hallé Orchestra and the D'Oyly Carte. His father strongly opposed the idea that Leigh might become an artist or an actor. He forbade him his frequent habit of sketching visitors who came to the house and regarded him as a problem child because of his creative interests. In 1960, "to his utter astonishment", Leigh won a scholarship to RADA. Initially trained as an actor at RADA, Leigh started to hone his directing skills at East 15 Acting School, where he met the actress Alison Steadman.

Leigh responded negatively to RADA's agenda, finding himself being taught how to "laugh, cry and snog" for weekly rep purposes, and became a sullen student. He later attended Camberwell School of Arts and Crafts (in 1963), the Central School of Art and Design and the London School of Film Technique on Charlotte Street. When he had arrived in London, one of the first films he had seen was Shadows (1959), an improvised film by John Cassavetes, in which a cast of unknowns was observed "living, loving and bickering" on the streets of New York, and Leigh "felt it might be possible to create complete plays from scratch with a group of actors". Other influences from this time included Harold Pinter's The Caretaker—"Leigh was mesmerised by the play and the (Arts Theatre) production"—Samuel Beckett, whose novels he read avidly, and Flann O'Brien, whose "tragi-comedy" Leigh found particularly appealing. Influential and important productions he saw in this period included Beckett's Endgame, Peter Brook's King Lear and in 1965 Peter Weiss's Marat/Sade, a production developed through improvisation, the actors basing their characterisations on people they had visited in a mental hospital. The visual worlds of Picasso, Ronald Searle, George Grosz, and William Hogarth exerted another kind of influence. Leigh had small roles in several British films in the early 1960s (West 11, Two Left Feet), and played a young deaf-mute, interrogated by Rupert Davies, in the BBC Television series Maigret. In 1964–65, he collaborated with David Halliwell, and designed and directed the first production of Little Malcolm and His Struggle Against the Eunuchs at the Unity Theatre.

Leigh has been called "a gifted cartoonist ... a northerner who came south, slightly chippy, fiercely proud (and critical) of his roots and Jewish background; and he is a child of the 1960s and of the explosion of interest in the European cinema and the possibilities of television."

== Career ==
=== 1965–1979: Plays and television films ===
In 1965, Leigh went to work at the Midlands Art Centre in Birmingham as a resident assistant director and started to experiment with the idea that writing and rehearsing could be part of the same process. The Box Play, a family scenario staged in a cagelike box, "absorbed all sorts of contemporary ideas in art such as the space frames of Roland Pichet..it was visually very exciting," and two more "improvised" pieces followed.

After the Birmingham interlude, Leigh found a flat in Euston, where he lived for the next ten years. In 1966–67, he worked as an assistant director with the Royal Shakespeare Company on productions of Macbeth, Coriolanus, and The Taming of the Shrew. He worked on an improvised play of his own with some professional actors called NENAA (an acronym for "North East New Arts Association"), which explored the fantasies of a Tynesider working in a café, with ideas of founding an arts association in the northeast.

In 1970, Leigh wrote, "I saw that we must start off with a collection of totally unrelated characters (each one the specific creation of its actor) and then go through a process in which I must cause them to meet each other, and build a network of real relationships; the play would be drawn from the results." After Stratford-upon-Avon, Leigh directed a couple of London drama school productions that included Thomas Dekker's The Honest Whore at E15 Acting School in Loughton—where he met Alison Steadman for the first time. In 1968, wanting to return to Manchester, he sublet his London flat and moved to Levenshulme. Taking up a part-time lectureship in a Catholic women teachers training college, Sedgley Park, he ran a drama course and devised and directed Epilogue, focusing on a priest with doubts, and for the Manchester Youth Theatre he devised and directed two big-cast projects, Big Basil and Glum Victoria and the Lad with Specs.

As the decade came to a close, Leigh knew he wanted to make films, and that "The manner of working was at last fixed. There would be discussions and rehearsals. Plays or films would develop organically with actors fully liberated into the creative process. After an exploratory improvisation period, Leigh would write a structure, indicating the order in which scenes happened, usually with a single bare sentence: Johnny and Sophie meet; Betty does Joy's hair; [etc.] And it was rehearsed and rehearsed until it achieved the required quality of 'finish'."

In the 1970s, Leigh made nine television plays. Earlier plays such as Nuts in May (1976) and Abigail's Party (1977) tended more toward bleak yet humorous satire of middle-class manners and attitudes. His plays are generally more caustic, stridently trying to depict society's banality. Goose-Pimples and Abigail's Party focus on the vulgar middle class in a convivial party setting that spirals out of control. The television version of Abigail's Party was made at some speed; Steadman was pregnant at the time, and Leigh's objections to flaws in the production, particularly the lighting, led to his preference for theatrical films.

=== 1980–1993: Early British films ===
In 1983, Leigh directed the comedy-drama film Meantime, starring Gary Oldman and Tim Roth. The project was shown on Channel 4 and premiered at the Berlin International Film Festival. For The Criterion Collection, Sean O'Sullivan wrote that the film was addressing "the crisis of national identity triggered by Margaret Thatcher's election in 1979".

There was something of a hiatus in Leigh's career after his father died in February 1985. Leigh was in Australia at the time—having agreed to attend a screenwriters' conference in Melbourne at the start of 1985, he had then accepted an invitation to teach at the Australian Film School in Sydney—and he then "buried his solitude and sense of loss in a busy round of people, publicity and talks". He gradually extended "the long journey home", visiting Bali, Singapore, Hong Kong, and China. He has said, "The whole thing was an amazing, unforgettable period in my life. But it was all to do with personal feelings, my father, where to go next, and my desire to make a feature film. I felt I was at the end of one stage of my career and at the start of another."

Leigh's 1986 project code-named "Rhubarb", for which he had gathered actors in Blackburn, including Jane Horrocks, Julie Walters and David Thewlis, was cancelled after seven weeks' rehearsals, and Leigh returned home. "The nature of what I do is totally creative, and you have to get in there and stick with it. The tension between the bourgeois suburban and the anarchist bohemian that is in my work is obviously in my life, too...I started to pull myself together. I didn't work, I simply stayed at home and looked after the boys." In 1987 Channel 4 put up some money for a short film and, with Portman Productions, agreed to co-produce Leigh's first feature film since Bleak Moments.

In 1988, Leigh and producer Simon Channing Williams founded Thin Man Films, a film production company based in London, to produce Leigh's films. They chose the company name because neither of them was thin. Later in 1988, Leigh made High Hopes, about a disjointed working-class family whose members live in a rundown flat and a council house. His later films, such as Naked and Vera Drake, are somewhat starker and more brutal, and concentrate more on the working class. Leigh's stage plays include Smelling A Rat, It's A Great Big Shame, Greek Tragedy, Goose-Pimples, Ecstasy, and Abigail's Party.

In the 1990s, Leigh enjoyed critical successes, including such films as the comedy Life Is Sweet (1990) starring Alison Steadman, Jim Broadbent, Timothy Spall, Claire Skinner, and Jane Horrocks. It was his third feature film, and follows a working-class North London family over a few summer weeks. Film critic Philip French in The Observer defended the film against criticism that it was patronising: "Leigh has been called patronising. The charge is false. The Noël Coward/David Lean film This Happy Breed, evoked by Leigh in several panning shots across suburban back gardens, is patronising. Coward and Lean pat their characters on the back...Leigh shakes them, hugs them, sometimes despairs over them, but never thinks that they are other than versions of ourselves." Independent Spirit Awards nominated Life Is Sweet for Best International Film.

Leigh's fourth feature film was the black comedy Naked (1993), starring David Thewlis. It premiered at the 46th Cannes Film Festival, where it competed for the Palme d'Or and won Best Director for Leigh and Best Actor for Thewlis. Derek Malcolm of The Guardian wrote that the film "is certainly Leigh's most striking piece of cinema to date" and that "it tries to articulate what is wrong with the society that Mrs Thatcher claims does not exist."

=== 1996–2009: International recognition ===
In 1996, Leigh directed his fifth feature film, the drama Secrets & Lies (1996). Its ensemble cast included Leigh regulars Timothy Spall, Brenda Blethyn, Phyllis Logan, and Marianne Jean-Baptiste. The film premiered at the 1996 Cannes Film Festival, where it received the Palme d'Or and the Best Actress award for Blethyn. It was a financial and critical success. Film critic Roger Ebert, writing for the Chicago Sun-Times, gave Secrets & Lies four out of four stars, writing, "moment after moment, scene after scene, Secrets & Lies unfolds with the fascination of eavesdropping". He called the film "a flowering of his technique. It moves us on a human level, it keeps us guessing during scenes as unpredictable as life, and it shows us how ordinary people have a chance of somehow coping with their problems, which are rather ordinary, too." In 2009, Ebert added the film to his "Great Movies" list. It received five Academy Award nominations, including Best Picture and Best Director.

He followed that success with Career Girls (1997) and Topsy-Turvy (1999), a period drama about the creation of Gilbert and Sullivan's The Mikado. The anger inherent in Leigh's material, in some ways typical of the Thatcher years, softened after her departure from the political scene. In 2005, Leigh returned to directing for the stage after many years with a new play, Two Thousand Years, at the Royal National Theatre. The play deals with divisions within a left-wing secular Jewish family when one of the younger members finds religion. It was the first time Leigh had drawn on his Jewish background for material. In 2002, Leigh directed the working-class drama All or Nothing. The same year, he became chairman for his alma mater, London Film School. He remained chair until March 2018, when he was succeeded by Greg Dyke.

In 2004, he directed his ninth feature film, Vera Drake, a period film about a working-class woman (Imelda Staunton) who performs illegal abortions during the 1950s. The film premiered at the 61st Venice International Film Festival to rapturous reviews, winning the Golden Lion for Best Film and the Volpi Cup for Best Actress for Staunton. Review aggregator Rotten Tomatoes gave the film an approval rating of 92% with the consensus, "with a piercingly powerful performance by Imelda Staunton, Vera Drake brings teeming humanity to the controversial subject of abortion." The film received 11 British Academy Film Award nominations, winning three awards, for Best Director, Best Actress in a Leading Role and Best Costume Design. The film was also nominated for three Academy Awards, for Best Director, Best Actress, and Best Screenplay.

In 2008, Leigh released a modern-day comedy, Happy-Go-Lucky, starring Sally Hawkins. It debuted at the Berlin International Film Festival, where Hawkins won the Silver Bear for Best Actress. The film was a critical success, with many praising Hawkins's performance. She received many awards, including a Golden Globe Award for Best Actress – Motion Picture Comedy or Musical. The same year, Leigh was elected a Fellow of the Royal Society of Literature.

=== 2010–present ===
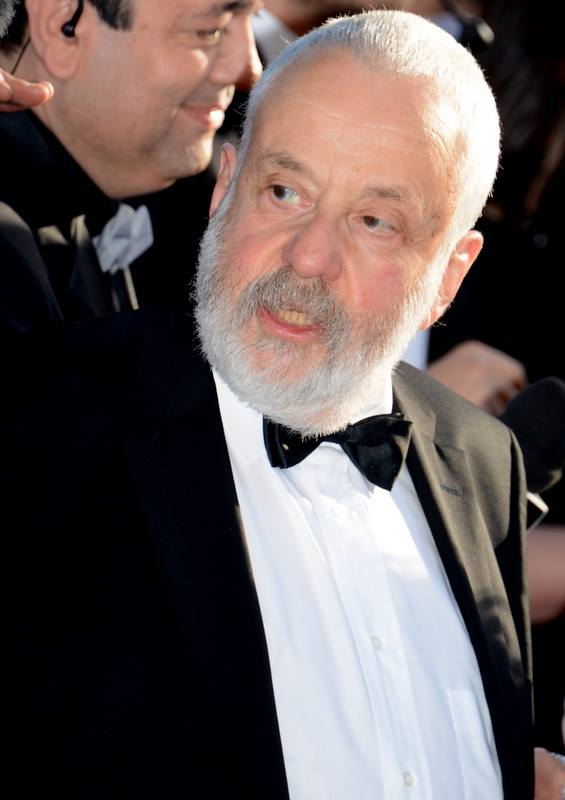
Leigh at the 2014 Cannes Film Festival

In 2010, Leigh released his film Another Year, starring Jim Broadbent, Ruth Sheen, and Lesley Manville. It premiered at the 2010 Cannes Film Festival in competition for the Palme d'Or. The film was shown at the 54th London Film Festival before its general British release date on 5 November 2010. The film was also a success in the U.S., with Ebert giving the film his highest rating, four out of four stars, and writing, "Not quite every year brings a new Mike Leigh film, but the years that do are blessed with his sympathy, penetrating observation, and instinct for human comedy...Leigh's Another Year is like a long, purifying soak in empathy." At the 83rd Academy Awards, Leigh was nominated for Best Original Screenplay, losing to The King's Speech.

In 2012, Leigh was selected to be jury president of the 62nd Berlin International Film Festival. He released his 12th feature film, the biographical period film Mr. Turner (2014), based on the life and artworks of J. M. W. Turner, portrayed by Timothy Spall. The film premiered at the 2014 Cannes Film Festival, where it competed for the Palme d'Or and won rave reviews, with many critics praising Spall's performance. Spall received the Cannes Film Festival Award for Best Actor and the film won the Vulcan Award for its cinematography by Dick Pope. Observer critic Mark Kermode called the film a "portrait of a man wrestling light with his hands as if it were a physical element: tangible, malleable, corporeal". That year, Leigh joined The Hollywood Reporter for an hourlong roundtable discussion with other directors who had made films that year: Richard Linklater (Boyhood), Bennett Miller (Foxcatcher), Morten Tyldum (The Imitation Game), Angelina Jolie (Unbroken), and Christopher Nolan (Interstellar). Mr. Turner received Academy Award nominations for Cinematography, Production Design, and Costume Design.

In 2015, Leigh accepted an offer from English National Opera to direct the Gilbert and Sullivan operetta The Pirates of Penzance (with conductor David Parry, designer Alison Chitty, and starring Andrew Shore, Rebecca de Pont Davies and Jonathan Lemalu). The production then toured Europe, visiting Luxembourg (Les Théâtres de la Ville de Luxembourg), Caen (Théâtre de Caen) and Saarländisches Staatstheater. In 2018, Leigh released another historical feature, Peterloo, based on the 1819 Peterloo Massacre. The film was selected to be screened in the main competition section of the 75th Venice International Film Festival. It was distributed in the UK by Entertainment One and in the US by Amazon Video. It received mixed reviews; The New York Times called it a "brilliant and demanding film".

In February 2020, it was reported that Leigh would begin shooting his latest film in the summer. After a delay due to the COVID-19 pandemic, it was announced that the film, Hard Truths, would go into production in 2023. Set in contemporary times, it stars Marianne Jean-Baptiste and Michele Austin, and was released in 2024. In 2024, Leigh said he was struggling to secure funding for his next project, but in October 2025, it was announced that Bleecker Street had made a distribution deal for his new film. Set to be released in 2026, Tender Loving Care stars Marion Bailey and Kate O'Flynn. Later that year, he announced the film would "most likely" be his last, given physical challenges caused by a muscular illness.

== Filmmaking style ==
Leigh uses lengthy improvisations developed over several weeks to build characters and storylines for his films. He starts with some ideas of how he thinks things might develop, but does not reveal all his intentions to the cast, who gradually discover their fates and act out their responses. Initial preparation is in private with Leigh, and then the actors are introduced to each other in the order that their characters would have met in their lives. Intimate moments are explored that will not even be referred to in the final film, to build insight and understanding of history, character and personal motivation. When an improvisation needs to be stopped, he tells the actors, "Come out of character", before they discuss what happened or might have happened in a situation. According to critic Michael Coveney, Leigh's films and stage plays "comprise a distinctive, homogenous body of work which stands comparison with anyone's in the British theatre and cinema over the same period."

Final filming is more traditional as a definite sense of story, action and dialogue is then in place. Leigh reminds the cast of material from the improvisations that he hopes to capture on film. "The world of the characters and their relationships is brought into existence by discussion and a great amount of improvisation ... And research into anything and everything that will fill out the authenticity of the character." After months of rehearsal, or "preparing for going out on location to make up a film", Leigh writes a shooting script, a bare scenario. Then, on location, after further "real rehearsing", the script is finalized: "I'll set up an improvisation, ... I'll analyse and discuss it, ... we'll do another and I'll ... refine and refine... until the actions and dialogue are totally integrated. Then we shoot it."

In an interview with Laura Miller, Leigh said, "I make very stylistic films indeed, but style doesn't become a substitute for truth and reality. It's an integral, organic part of the whole thing." He strives to depict ordinary life, "real life", unfolding under extenuating circumstances. He has said, "I'm not an intellectual filmmaker. These are emotional, subjective, intuitive, instinctive, vulnerable films. And there's a feeling of despair...I think there's a feeling of chaos and disorder." Of the criticism Naked received, Leigh said: "The criticism comes from the kind of quarters where 'political correctness' in its worst manifestation is rife. It's this kind of naive notion of how we should be in an unrealistic and altogether unhealthily over-wholesome way."

Leigh's characters often struggle "to express inexpressible feelings. Words are important, but rarely enough. The art of evasion and failure in communication certainly comes from Pinter, whom Leigh acknowledges as an important influence. He especially admires Pinter's earliest work and directed The Caretaker while still at RADA."

Leigh has helped to create stars—Liz Smith in Hard Labour, Alison Steadman in Abigail's Party, Brenda Blethyn in Grown-Ups, Antony Sher in Goose-Pimples, Gary Oldman and Tim Roth in Meantime, Jane Horrocks in Life Is Sweet, David Thewlis in Naked—and it has been said that the list of actors who have worked with him—including Paul Jesson, Phil Daniels, Lindsay Duncan, Lesley Sharp, Kathy Burke, Stephen Rea, and Julie Walters—"comprises an impressive, almost representative, nucleus of outstanding British acting talent." His sensibility has been compared to those of Yasujirō Ozu and Federico Fellini. In The New York Review of Books, Ian Buruma wrote: "It is hard to get on a London bus or listen to the people at the next table in a cafeteria without thinking of Mike Leigh. Like other wholly original artists, he has staked out his own territory. Leigh's London is as distinctive as Fellini's Rome or Ozu's Tokyo."

== Influences ==
Leigh has cited Jean Renoir and Satyajit Ray among his favourite film makers. In a 1991 interview, he also cited Frank Capra, Fritz Lang, Yasujirō Ozu and even Jean-Luc Godard, "until the late '60s." When pressed for British influences in that interview, he referred to the Ealing comedies, "despite their unconsciously patronizing way of portraying working-class people", and the early '60s British New Wave films. Asked for his favourite comedies, he replied, One, Two, Three; La règle du jeu; and "any Keaton". The critic David Thomson has written that, with the camera work in his films characterised by "a detached, medical watchfulness", Leigh's aesthetic may justly be compared to Ozu's. Michael Coveney wrote: "The cramped domestic interiors of Ozu find many echoes in Leigh's scenes on stairways and in corridors and on landings, especially in Grown-Ups, Meantime and Naked. And two wonderful little episodes in Ozu's Tokyo Story, in a hairdressing salon and a bar, must have been in Leigh's subconscious memory when he made The Short and Curlies (1987), one of his most devastatingly funny pieces of work and the pub scene in Life Is Sweet".

== Favourite films ==
In 2012, Leigh participated in that year's Sight & Sound film polls. Held every ten years to select the greatest films of all time, contemporary directors were asked to select ten films. Leigh named the following ten:

- American Madness (USA, 1932)
- Barry Lyndon (UK/USA, 1975)
- The Emigrants (Sweden, 1970)
- How a Mosquito Operates (USA, 1912)
- I Am Cuba (Cuba/USSR, 1964)
- Jules and Jim (France, 1962)
- Radio Days (USA, 1987)
- Songs from the Second Floor (Sweden, 2000)
- Tokyo Story (Japan, 1953)
- The Tree of Wooden Clogs (Italy, 1978)

Leigh participated again in the 2022 poll, selecting the following ten films:

- The 400 Blows (France, 1959)
- Barry Lyndon (UK/USA, 1975)
- The Death of Mr. Lazarescu (Romania, 2005)
- The Gospel According to St. Matthew (Italy, 1964)
- Here Is Your Life (Sweden, 1966)
- How a Mosquito Operates (USA, 1912)
- Loves of a Blonde (Czechoslovakia, 1965)
- Some Like It Hot (USA, 1959)
- Songs from the Second Floor (Sweden, 2000)
- Tokyo Story (Japan, 1953)

== Personal life ==
Blue plaque to Mike Leigh and Alison Steadman

In September 1973, Leigh married actress Alison Steadman. They have two sons. Steadman appeared in seven of his films and several of his plays, including Wholesome Glory and Abigail's Party. They divorced in 2001. Leigh then lived in central London with the actress Marion Bailey.

== Political activism ==
Leigh is an atheist and a Distinguished Supporter of Humanists UK. He is also a republican. In 2014, Leigh publicly backed "Hacked Off" and its campaign for UK press self-regulation by "safeguarding the press from political interference while also giving vital protection to the vulnerable."

In November 2019, along with other public figures, Leigh signed a letter supporting Labour Party leader Jeremy Corbyn, calling him "a beacon of hope in the struggle against emergent far-right nationalism, xenophobia and racism in much of the democratic world" and endorsing him in the 2019 UK general election. In December 2019, along with 42 other leading cultural figures, Leigh signed a letter endorsing the Labour Party under Corbyn's leadership in the 2019 general election. The letter stated: "Labour's election manifesto under Jeremy Corbyn's leadership offers a transformative plan that prioritises the needs of people and the planet over private profit and the vested interests of a few."

== Filmography ==
Year	Title	Distribution
1971	Bleak Moments	BBC Films
1983	Meantime	BBC Films
1988	High Hopes	Palace Pictures
1990	Life Is Sweet	Palace Pictures
1993	Naked	First Independent Films
1996	Secrets & Lies	FilmFour Distributors
1997	Career Girls	FilmFour Distributors
1999	Topsy-Turvy	Pathé Distribution
2002	All or Nothing	UGC Films UK
2004	Vera Drake	Momentum Pictures
2008	Happy-Go-Lucky	Momentum Pictures
2010	Another Year	Momentum Pictures
2014	Mr. Turner	Momentum Pictures
2018	Peterloo	Entertainment One/Amazon
2024	Hard Truths	StudioCanal
2026	Tender Loving Care	StudioCanal

== Accolades and honours ==
Leigh has been nominated at the Academy Awards seven times: twice each for Secrets & Lies and Vera Drake (Best Original Screenplay and Best Director) and once for Topsy-Turvy, Happy-Go-Lucky, and Another Year (Best Original Screenplay only). Leigh has also won several prizes at major European film festivals. Most notably, he won the Best Director award at Cannes for Naked in 1993 and the Palme d'Or in 1996 for Secrets & Lies. He won the Leone d'Oro for the best film at the International Venice Film Festival in 2004 with Vera Drake.

Leigh has also directed six actors to best actor or actress wins at the three major European film festivals: Berlin, Cannes, and Venice. David Thewlis, Brenda Blethyn, and Timothy Spall won for Naked, Secrets & Lies, and Mr. Turner, respectively, at the Cannes Film Festival; Jim Broadbent and Imelda Staunton won for Topsy-Turvy and Vera Drake at the Venice Film Festival; and Sally Hawkins won for Happy-Go-Lucky at the Berlin Film Festival.

Leigh was appointed an Officer of the Order of the British Empire (OBE) in the 1993 Birthday Honours, for services to the film industry. In 2002 he was awarded an honorary degree from the University of Essex.

Accolades for Leigh's directed features
Year	Picture	Academy Awards		BAFTAs		Golden Globes	
Year	Picture	Nominations	Wins	Nominations	Wins	Nominations	Wins
1993	Naked			1			
1996	Secrets & Lies	5		7	3	3	1
1999	Topsy-Turvy	4	2	5	1		
2004	Vera Drake	3		11	3	1	
2008	Happy-Go-Lucky	1				2	1
2010	Another Year	1		2			
2014	Mr. Turner	4		4			
2024	Hard Truths			2			
Total		18	2	32	7	6	2

Directed Academy Award performances

Under Leigh's direction, these actresses have received Academy Award nominations for their performances in their respective roles.

Year	Performer	Film	Result
Academy Award for Best Actress
1997	Brenda Blethyn	Secrets & Lies	Nominated
2005	Imelda Staunton	Vera Drake	Nominated
Academy Award for Best Supporting Actress
1997	Marianne Jean-Baptiste	Secrets & Lies	Nominated

== See also ==
- Kitchen sink realism
- Angry young men
- Working class culture
- List of Academy Award winners and nominees from Great Britain
