= Washington D.C. Area Film Critics Association Award for Best Supporting Actress =

Annual US film award

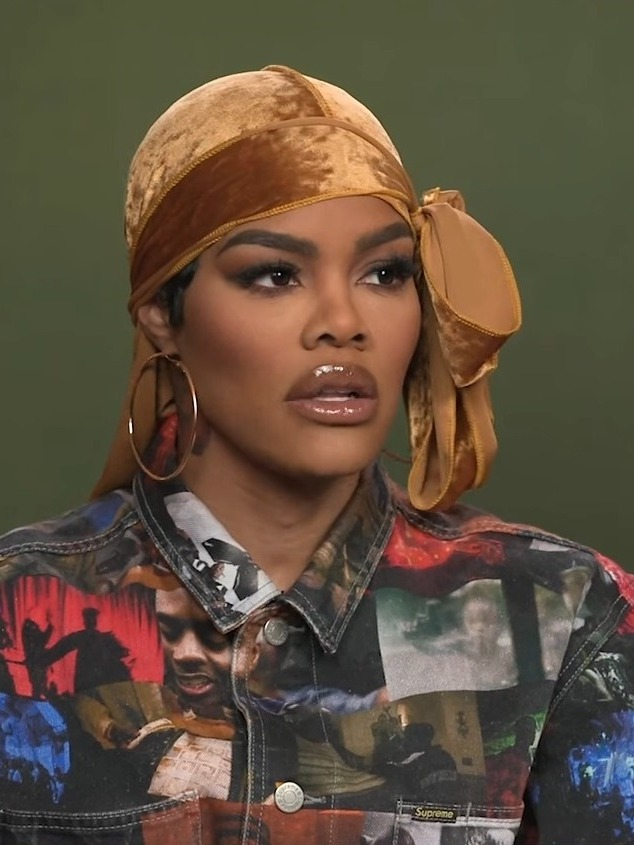
- Current recipient: Teyana Taylor
- Awarded for: Best Performance by an Actress in a Supporting Role
- Country: United States
- Presented by: Washington D.C. Area Film Critics Association
- First award: Kathy Bates, About Schmidt (2002)
- Currently held by: Teyana Taylor; One Battle After Another (2025)

The Washington D.C. Area Film Critics Association Award for Best Supporting Actress is one of the annual awards given by the Washington D.C. Area Film Critics Association.

== Winners and nominees ==
=== 2000s ===
| Year | Actress | Film | Role |
|---|---|---|---|
| 2002 | Kathy Bates | About Schmidt | Roberta Hertzel |
| 2002 | Michelle Pfeiffer | White Oleander | Ingrid Magnussen |
| 2002 | Renée Zellweger | White Oleander | Claire Richards |
| 2003 | Anna Deavere Smith | The Human Stain | Dorothy Silk |
| 2003 | Sarah Bolger | In America | Christy Sullivan |
| 2003 | Holly Hunter | Thirteen | Melanie Freeland |
| 2003 | Ludivine Sagnier | Swimming Pool | Julie |
| 2003 | Renée Zellweger | Cold Mountain | Ruby Thewes |
| 2004 | Cate Blanchett | The Aviator | Katharine Hepburn |
| 2005 | Amy Adams | Junebug | Ashley Johnsten |
| 2005 | Brenda Blethyn | Pride & Prejudice | Mrs. Bennet |
| 2005 | Taraji P. Henson | Hustle & Flow | Shug |
| 2005 | Catherine Keener | Capote | Nelle Harper Lee |
| 2005 | Michelle Williams | Brokeback Mountain | Alma Beers-Del Mar |
| 2006 | Jennifer Hudson | Dreamgirls | Effie White |
| 2007 | Amy Ryan | Gone Baby Gone | Helene McCready |
| 2007 | Amy Ryan | Before the Devil Knows You're Dead | Martha Hanson |
| 2008 | Rosemarie DeWitt | Rachel Getting Married | Rachel Buchman |
| 2009 | Mo'Nique | Precious | Mary Lee Johnston |
| 2009 | Vera Farmiga | Up in the Air | Alex Goran |
| 2009 | Anna Kendrick | Up in the Air | Natalie Keener |
| 2009 | Julianne Moore | A Single Man | Charlotte (Charley) |
| 2009 | Samantha Morton | The Messenger | Olivia Pitterson |

=== 2010s ===
| Year | Actress | Film | Role |
|---|---|---|---|
| 2010 | Melissa Leo | The Fighter | Alice Eklund |
| 2010 | Amy Adams | The Fighter | Charlene Fleming |
| 2010 | Helena Bonham Carter | The King's Speech | Queen Elizabeth |
| 2010 | Hailee Steinfeld | True Grit | Mattalyn "Mattie" Ross |
| 2010 | Jacki Weaver | Animal Kingdom | Janine "Smurf" Cody |
| 2011 | Octavia Spencer | The Help | Minny Jackson |
| 2011 | Bérénice Bejo | The Artist | Peppy Miller |
| 2011 | Melissa McCarthy | Bridesmaids | Megan Price |
| 2011 | Carey Mulligan | Shame | Sissy Sullivan |
| 2011 | Shailene Woodley | The Descendants | Alexandra "Alex" King |
| 2012 | Anne Hathaway | Les Misérables | Fantine |
| 2012 | Amy Adams | The Master | Peggy Dodd |
| 2012 | Samantha Barks | Les Misérables | Éponine |
| 2012 | Sally Field | Lincoln | Mary Todd Lincoln |
| 2012 | Helen Hunt | The Sessions | Cheryl Cohen-Greene |
| 2013 | Lupita Nyong'o | 12 Years a Slave | Patsey |
| 2013 | Scarlett Johansson | Her | Samantha |
| 2013 | Jennifer Lawrence | American Hustle | Rosalyn Rosenfeld |
| 2013 | Octavia Spencer | Fruitvale Station | Wanda Johnson |
| 2013 | June Squibb | Nebraska | Kate Grant |
| 2014 | Patricia Arquette | Boyhood | Olivia Evans |
| 2014 | Jessica Chastain | A Most Violent Year | Anna Morales |
| 2014 | Laura Dern | Wild | Bobbi Grey |
| 2014 | Emma Stone | Birdman | Sam Thomson |
| 2014 | Tilda Swinton | Snowpiercer | Deputy-Minister Mason |
| 2015 | Alicia Vikander | Ex Machina | Ava |
| 2015 | Jennifer Jason Leigh | The Hateful Eight | Daisy Domergue |
| 2015 | Rooney Mara | Carol | Therese Belivet |
| 2015 | Alicia Vikander | The Danish Girl | Gerda Wegener |
| 2015 | Kate Winslet | Steve Jobs | Joanna Hoffman |
| 2016 | Viola Davis | Fences | Rose Maxson |
| 2016 | Greta Gerwig | 20th Century Women | Abbie |
| 2016 | Naomie Harris | Moonlight | Paula |
| 2016 | Molly Shannon | Other People | Joanne Mayer |
| 2016 | Michelle Williams | Manchester by the Sea | Randi Chandler |
| 2017 | Laurie Metcalf | Lady Bird | Marion McPherson |
| 2017 | Mary J. Blige | Mudbound | Florence Jackson |
| 2017 | Tiffany Haddish | Girls Trip | Dina |
| 2017 | Holly Hunter | The Big Sick | Beth Gardner |
| 2017 | Allison Janney | I, Tonya | LaVona Golden |
| 2018 | Regina King | If Beale Street Could Talk | Sharon Rivers |
| 2018 | Cynthia Erivo | Bad Times at the El Royale | Darlene Sweet |
| 2018 | Nicole Kidman | Boy Erased | Nancy Eamons |
| 2018 | Emma Stone | The Favourite | Abigail Masham |
| 2018 | Rachel Weisz | The Favourite | Sarah Churchill |
| 2019 | Jennifer Lopez | Hustlers | Ramona Vega |
| 2019 | Laura Dern | Marriage Story | Nora Fanshaw |
| 2019 | Scarlett Johansson | Jojo Rabbit | Rosie Betzler |
| 2019 | Florence Pugh | Little Women | Amy March |
| 2019 | Zhao Shuzhen | The Farewell | Nai Nai |

=== 2020s ===
| Year | Actress | Film | Role |
|---|---|---|---|
| 2020 | Youn Yuh-jung | Minari | Soon-ja |
| 2020 | Maria Bakalova | Borat Subsequent Moviefilm | Tutar Sagdiyev |
| 2020 | Olivia Colman | The Father | Anne |
| 2020 | Dominique Fishback | Judas and the Black Messiah | Deborah Johnson |
| 2020 | Amanda Seyfried | Mank | Marion Davies |
| 2021 | Aunjanue Ellis-Taylor | King Richard | Oracene "Brandy" Price |
| 2021 | Caitríona Balfe | Belfast | Ma |
| 2021 | Ariana DeBose | West Side Story | Anita |
| 2021 | Ann Dowd | Mass | Linda |
| 2021 | Kirsten Dunst | The Power of the Dog | Rose Gordon |
| 2022 | Kerry Condon | The Banshees of Inisherin | Siobhán Súilleabháin |
| 2022 | Angela Bassett | Black Panther: Wakanda Forever | Ramonda |
| 2022 | Jamie Lee Curtis | Everything Everywhere All at Once | Deirdre Beaubeirdre |
| 2022 | Stephanie Hsu | Everything Everywhere All at Once | Joy Wang / Jobu Tupaki |
| 2022 | Janelle Monáe | Glass Onion: A Knives Out Mystery | Cassandra "Andi" Brand / Helen Brand |
| 2023 | Da'Vine Joy Randolph | The Holdovers | Mary Lamb |
| 2023 | Emily Blunt | Oppenheimer | Katherine Oppenheimer |
| 2023 | Danielle Brooks | The Color Purple | Sofia |
| 2023 | Viola Davis | Air | Deloris Jordan |
| 2023 | Jodie Foster | Nyad | Bonnie Stoll |
| 2024 | Danielle Deadwyler | The Piano Lesson | Berniece Charles |
| 2024 | Ariana Grande | Wicked | Galinda "Glinda" Upland |
| 2024 | Aunjanue Ellis-Taylor | Nickel Boys | Hattie |
| 2024 | Isabella Rossellini | Conclave | Sister Agnes |
| 2024 | Zoe Saldaña | Emilia Pérez | Rita Mora Castro |
| 2025 | Teyana Taylor | One Battle After Another | Perfidia Beverly Hills |
| 2025 | Ariana Grande | Wicked: For Good | Galinda "Glinda" Upland |
| 2025 | Inga Ibsdotter Lilleaas | Sentimental Value | Agnes Borg Pettersen |
| 2025 | Amy Madigan | Weapons | Gladys |
| 2025 | Wunmi Mosaku | Sinners | Annie |
