= Dallas–Fort Worth Film Critics Association Awards 2008 =

Annual US film awards ceremony

14th Dallas–Fort Worth Film Critics Association Awards
- Date: December 17, 2008
- Location: Dallas, Texas
- Country: United States
- Presented by: Dallas–Fort Worth Film Critics Association
- Website: dfwfilmcritics.net

The 14th Dallas–Fort Worth Film Critics Association Awards honoring the best in film for 2008 were announced on December 17, 2008. These awards "recognizing extraordinary accomplishment in film" are presented annually by the Dallas–Fort Worth Film Critics Association (DFWFCA), based in the Dallas–Fort Worth metroplex region of Texas. The organization, founded in 1990, includes 32 film critics for print, radio, television, and internet publications based in north Texas. The Dallas–Fort Worth Film Critics Association began presenting its annual awards list in 1991.

Unlike most years, no one film dominated the 2008 DFWFCA awards. Two films led the pack with just two wins each: Slumdog Millionaire took top honors in the Best Picture and Best Director (Danny Boyle) categories while The Dark Knight took Best Supporting Actor (Heath Ledger) and Best Cinematography (Wally Pfister).

Along with the 11 "best of" category awards, the group also presented the Russell Smith Award to Wendy and Lucy as the "best low-budget or cutting-edge independent film" of the year. The award is named in honor of late Dallas Morning News film critic Russell Smith.

== Winners ==
Winners are listed first and highlighted with boldface. Other films ranked by the annual poll are listed in order. While most categories saw 5 honorees named, some categories ranged from as many as 10 (Best Film) to as few as 2 (Best Cinematography, Best Animated Film, Best Screenplay).

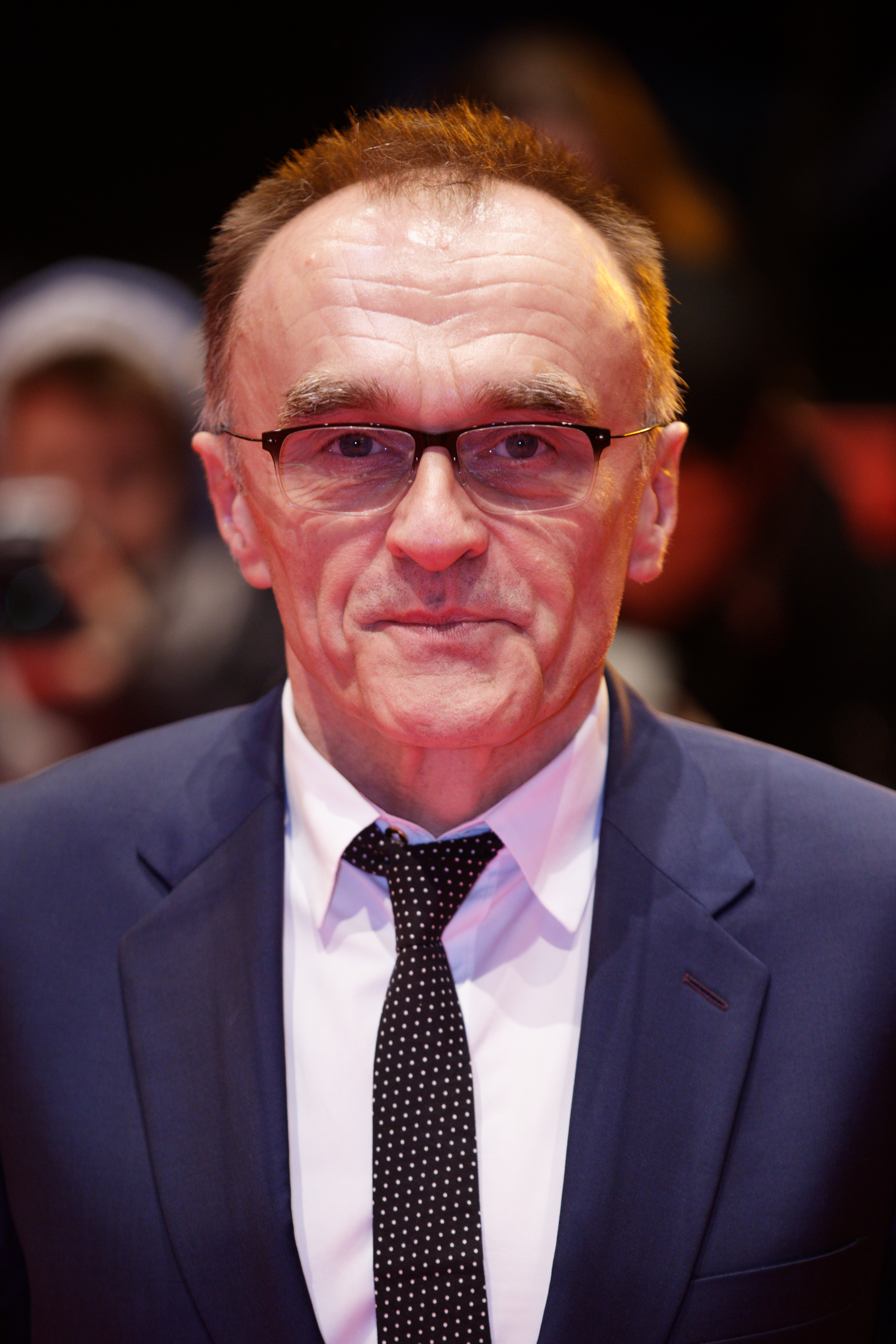
Danny Boyle, Best Director winner

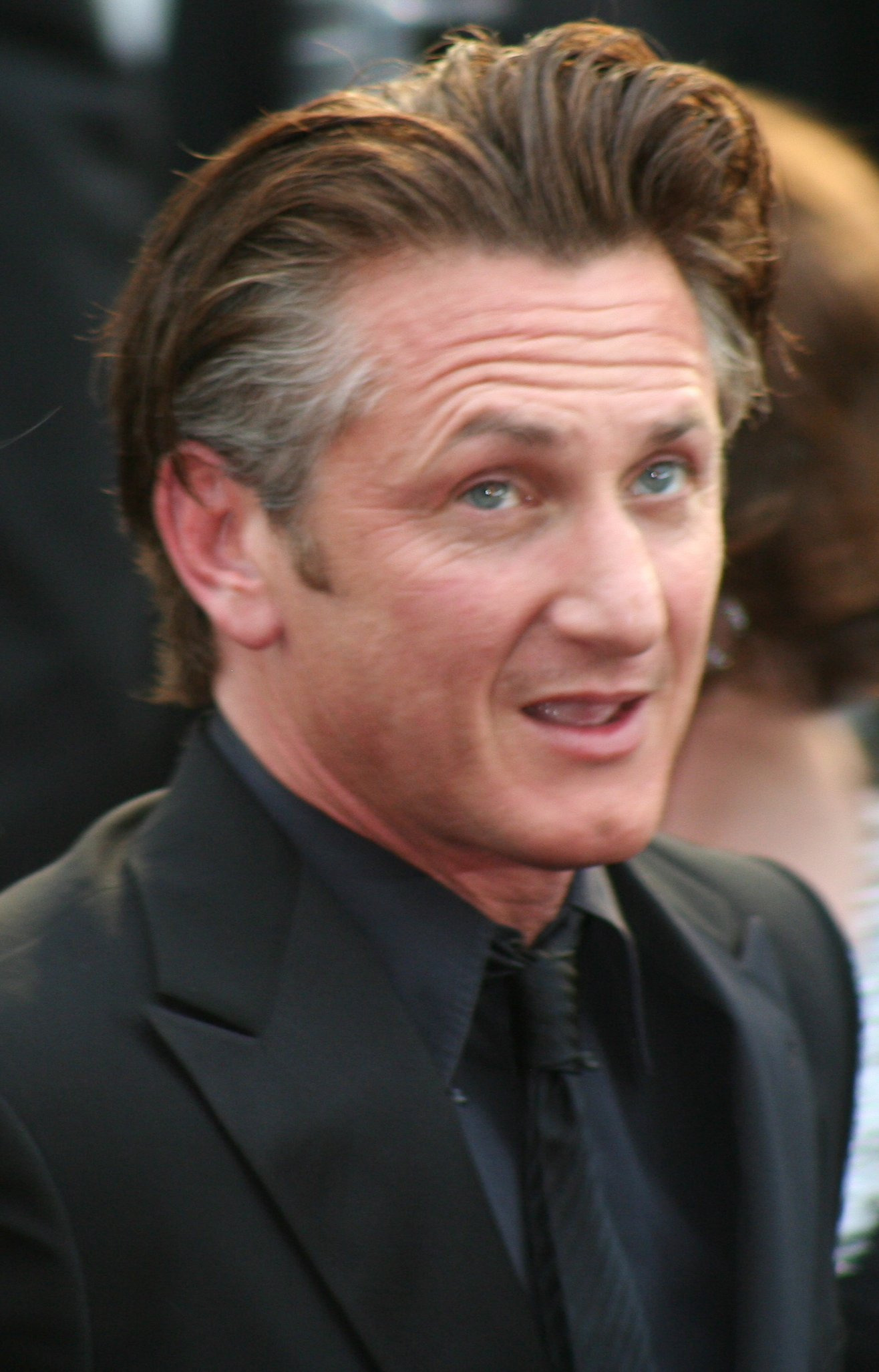
Sean Penn, Best Actor winner

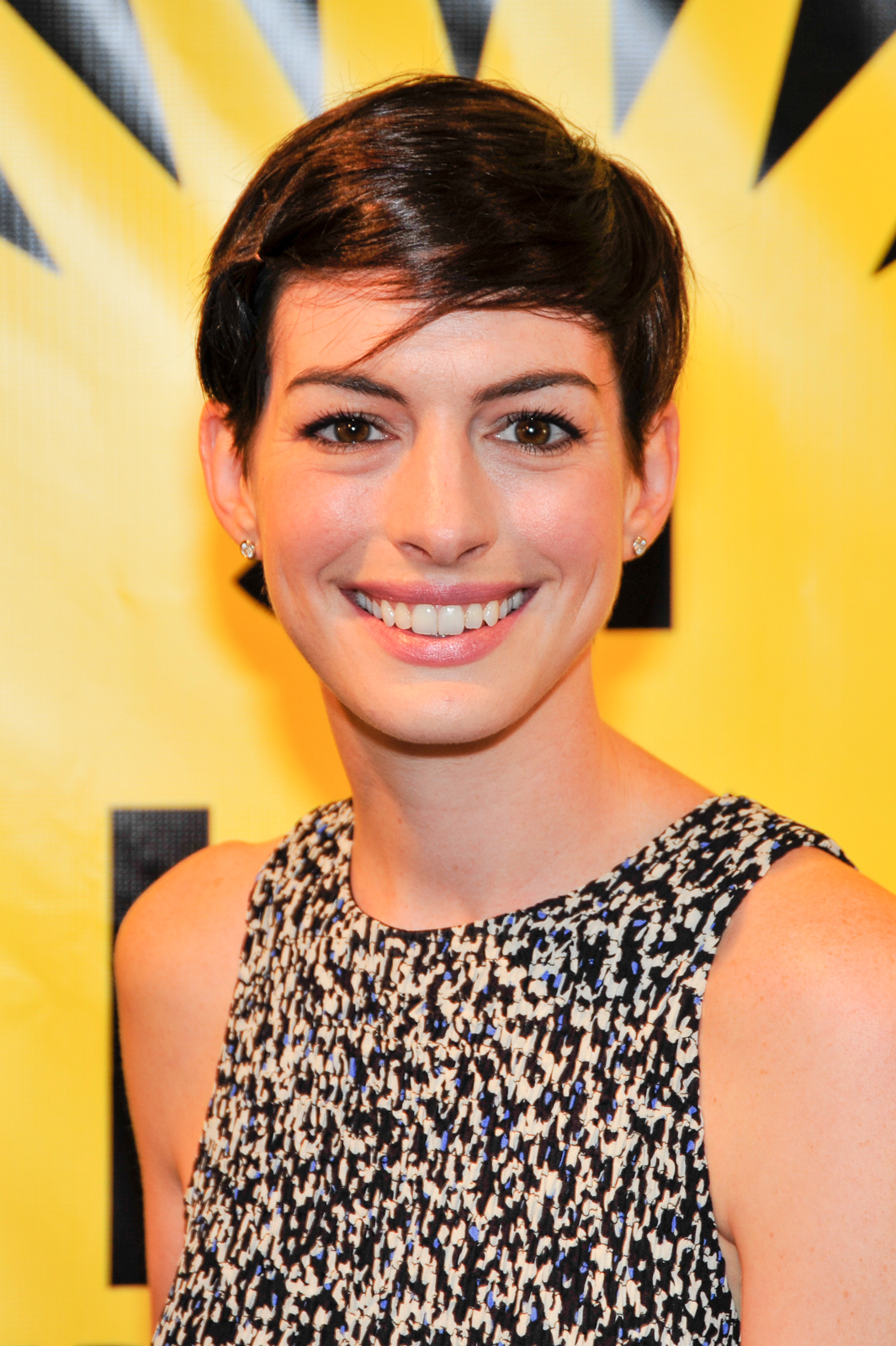
Anne Hathaway, Best Actress winner

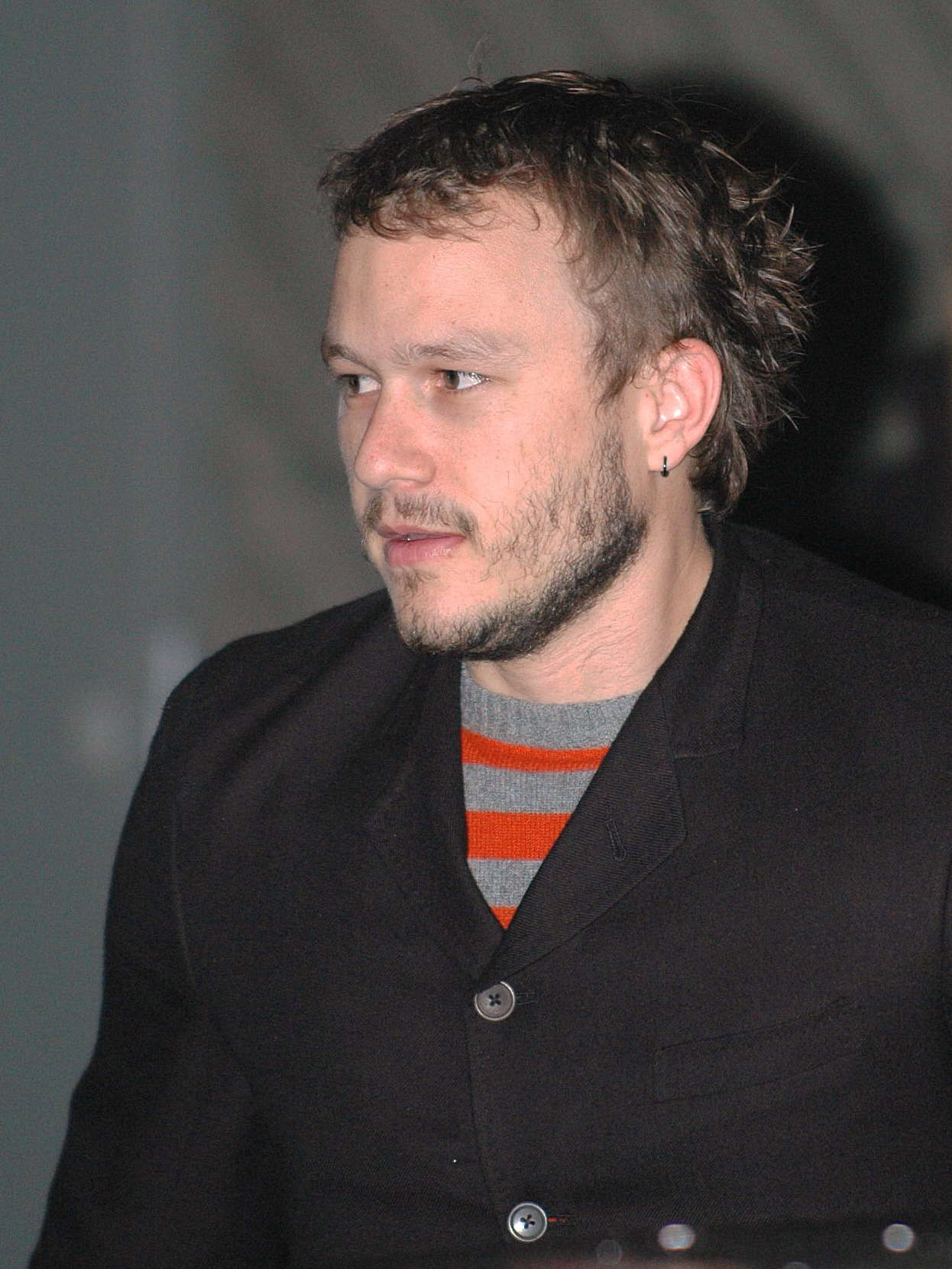
Heath Ledger, Best Supporting Actor winner

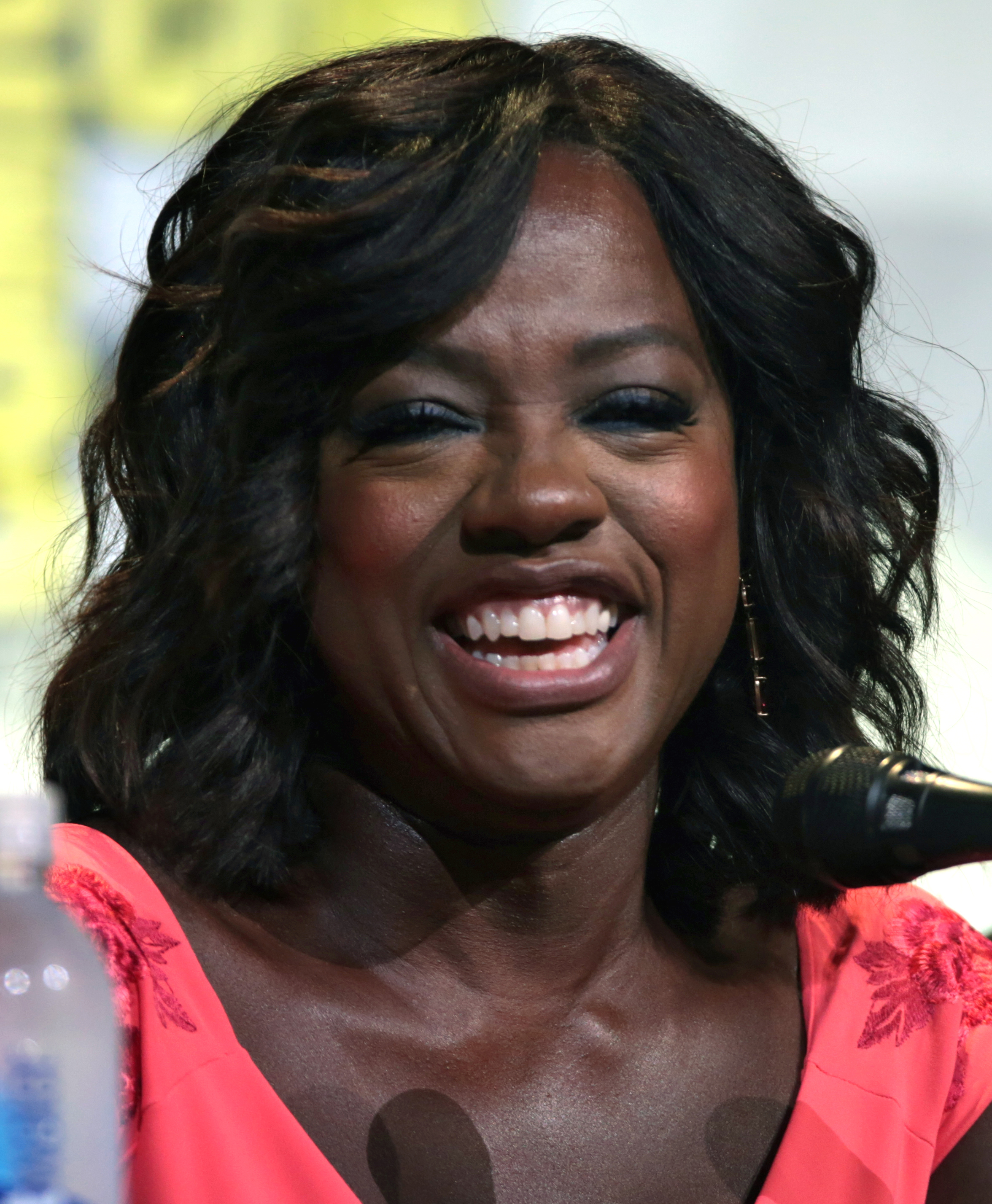
Viola Davis, Best Supporting Actress winner

=== Category awards ===
Best Picture	Best Director
1. **Slumdog Millionaire**; 2. Milk; 3. The Dark Knight; 4. The Curious Case of Benjamin Button; 5. The Wrestler; 6. The Visitor; 7. Frost/Nixon; 8. Doubt; 9. WALL-E; 10. Happy-Go-Lucky	1. **Danny Boyle** – Slumdog Millionaire; 2. David Fincher – The Curious Case of Benjamin Button; 3. Christopher Nolan – The Dark Knight; 4. Gus Van Sant – Milk; 5. Ron Howard – Frost/Nixon
Best Actor	Best Actress
1. **Sean Penn** – Milk as Harvey Milk; 2. Mickey Rourke – The Wrestler as Randy "The Ram" Robinson; 3. Frank Langella – Frost/Nixon as Richard Nixon; 4. Brad Pitt – The Curious Case of Benjamin Button as Benjamin Button; 5. Richard Jenkins – The Visitor as Walter Vale	1. **Anne Hathaway** – Rachel Getting Married as Kym; 2. Meryl Streep – Doubt as Sister Aloysius Beauvier; 3. Sally Hawkins – Happy-Go-Lucky as Pauline "Poppy" Cross; 4. Kristin Scott Thomas – I've Loved You So Long as Juliette Fontaine; 5. Kate Winslet – Revolutionary Road as April Wheeler
Best Supporting Actor	Best Supporting Actress
1. **Heath Ledger** – The Dark Knight as The Joker; 2. Josh Brolin – Milk as Dan White; 3. Eddie Marsan – Happy-Go-Lucky as Scott; 4. Philip Seymour Hoffman – Doubt as Father Brendan Flynn; 5. Robert Downey Jr. – Tropic Thunder as Kirk Lazarus	1. **Viola Davis** – Doubt as Mrs. Miller; 2. Penélope Cruz – Vicky Cristina Barcelona as María Elena; 3. Marisa Tomei – The Wrestler as Pam / Cassidy; 4. Taraji P. Henson – The Curious Case of Benjamin Button as Queenie; 5. Rosemarie DeWitt – Rachel Getting Married as Rachel
Best Foreign Language Film	Best Documentary Film
1. **Tell No One (Ne le dis à personne)** • France; 2. Waltz with Bashir • Israel; 3. Let the Right One In • Sweden; 4. I've Loved You So Long • France; 5. Gomorrah • Italy	1. **Man on Wire**; 2. Waltz with Bashir; 3. Young@Heart; 4. Standard Operating Procedure; 5. Dear Zachary: A Letter to a Son About His Father
Best Animated Film	Best Cinematography
1. **WALL-E**; 2. Kung Fu Panda	1. **Wally Pfister** – The Dark Knight; 2. Claudio Miranda – The Curious Case of Benjamin Button
Best Screenplay	
1. **Dustin Lance Black** – Milk; 2. Simon Beaufoy – Slumdog Millionaire	

=== Individual awards ===
==== Russell Smith Award ====
- Wendy and Lucy, for "best low-budget or cutting-edge independent film"
