= The Miss Firecracker Contest =

Play by Beth Henley

- Original language: English
- Written by: Beth Henley
- Characters: Carnelle Scott; Popeye Jackson; Elain Rutledge; Delmount Williams; Mac Sam; Tessy Mahoney
- Setting: Brookhaven, Mississippi

Premiere
- Date: May 1, 1984
- Place: Manhattan Theatre Club; New York City

The Miss Firecracker Contest is a Southern literature play written by Beth Henley. It was originally produced in Los Angeles in 1980 at the Victory Theater directed by Maria Gobetti. It got a production at the Manhattan Theatre Club off-Broadway in 1984 directed by Stephen Tobolowsky, who was Henley's romantic partner at the time. It moved to a larger off-Broadway house, the Westbank Theater, where it ran for a year. Although not as popular as Henley's Crimes of the Heart, The Miss Firecracker Contest has been generally well received among critics. Set in Brookhaven, Mississippi, the play explores the themes of femininity, beauty, and the need to be accepted.

== Plot ==
=== Background ===
The Miss Firecracker Contest is set in Brookhaven, Mississippi during the midst of Carnelle's attempt to salvage her tarnished reputation as "Miss Hot Tamale" through entering the Miss Firecracker Contest, the town's annual beauty pageant held on the Fourth of July. Carnelle, who is an orphan, was taken in by her Aunt Ronelle and raised with her two cousins, Elain and Delmount. Aunt Ronelle died of cancer after receiving a pituitary gland transplant from a monkey, causing her entire body to grow long black hairs. Elain won the Miss Firecracker pageant at the young age of 17, compared to Carnelle who pushes the pageant age limit of 24. Elain married well, using her beauty to win a husband after junior college. Delmount was admitted to a mental institution and has been involved in quite a few scandals with exotic beauties who catch his eye. Carnelle recently recovered from syphilis, though not before giving it to the sickly Mac Sam. Carnelle has been attempting to redefine herself by volunteering for the cancer society, attending church, and taking an orphan to dinner every week. She now plans to win the Miss Firecracker Contest to prove to everyone in Brookhaven that she is a valuable and beautiful young woman.

=== Act 1 ===
The play opens with Carnelle practicing her skit in her living room for the talent section of the pageant. Carnelle is a 24-year-old self-conscious woman with a tarnished reputation. Growing up, Carnelle developed self-esteem issues which caused her to seek the company of many men and eventually contract syphilis. Her past promiscuity earned her the nickname "Miss Hot Tamale," and in an effort to dissociate herself from her past Carnelle wants to be crowned Miss Firecracker at the upcoming pageant. Popeye, a 23-year-old quirky seamstress, arrives to take her measurements for the contest. Popeye earned her nickname by accidentally putting ear drops in her eyes as a child which caused them to swell. Popeye herself is quiet, shy, and impressionable, shown when she falls in love with Delmount after only seeing his picture. Carnelle and Elain then discuss the beauty pageant and Carnelle's chances of winning. Elain is Carnelle's beautiful first cousin who previously won the title of Miss Firecracker and has continued to be remembered for her beauty. Encouraged by her mother, Elain went to junior college and capitalized on her beauty to marry a wealthy man and while she appears to have the perfect life, Elain is unhappy and narcissistic. Elain confides in Carnelle that she has left her family. Delmount arrives to an empty living room, and Popeye meets Delmount. Delmount is Carnelle's 28-year-old cousin and Elain's brother. He has a history of violence, and pleaded insanity to avoid a jail sentence after hitting a man in the face with a glass bottle. Elain refused to take custody of him, so Delmount remained in the asylum longer than was originally intended. As a result, Delmount and Elain often butt heads. In addition, Delmount has strange recurring dreams about dismembered and deformed women's body parts, and has a strange obsession with beauty. Delmount explains to Carnelle that Aunt Ronelle's house was left to him and he intends to sell it and all of its contents. Elain and Delmount get into a heated debate about Delmount's criminal history and time in the asylum. Delmount tells Carnelle he intends to give half of the profits made from the house to her, and Carnelle eventually takes to the idea, inspired by the prospect of "leaving in a blaze of glory" after she wins the pageant.

As Delmount sets prices for the items in the living room, he and Elain argue about the past. The two reveal that Carnelle has not received a telephone call yet saying she is a finalist for the pageant. Although Delmount thinks the pageant is ridiculous, he still feels sorry for Carnelle. Elain tells Delmount she is leaving her husband, and Delmount is very happy because he does not like Franklin, though he suspects that Elain is not completely sincere. They discuss their mother, Carnelle's Aunt Ronelle, and her shortcomings as their caregiver. Popeye enters and tells Elain that her "heart is hot" and that she believes she is in love with Delmount. Elain is surprised to hear this and tells Popeye that Delmount is not sane. The phone rings and Carnelle answers it, finally receiving news that she is a finalist for the pageant.

=== Act 2 ===
The scene opens in a dressing room at the beauty pageant. Carnelle tells Tessy that she needs Popeye to fix her dress. Tessy is the 23-year-old coordinator of the Miss Firecracker Contest. Her twin sister is a contestant in the pageant, although neither of the women are attractive. Despite this fact, she has a history with Delmount, and flirts with him at the pageant. Mac Sam, Carnelle's 36-year-old ex-lover, is the balloon man at the pageant and visits her in her dressing room. They discuss the fact that Carnelle gave him syphilis and he has not been treated for the disease. In addition to syphilis, Mac Sam has a plethora of other diseases, all of which he refuses to treat medically simply because he has lived longer than he expected without treatment. After Mac Sam leaves, Delmount informs Carnelle that the house auction went well. Carnelle tells Delmount that Popeye has feelings for him, and Delmount becomes agitated. Elain enters with the news that Popeye is missing and thus cannot fix the dress, but she has brought a Mardi Gras mask that Carnelle can use to hide the poor alteration. Carnelle receives a frog suit from Mac Sam and realizes that Popeye is somewhere close by, so Carnelle and Elain leave to find her. Popeye tries to fix the dress in their absence. Mac Sam, Carnelle, and Elain all come back to the dressing room, and Carnelle panics because the dress cannot be fixed without scissors. The others calm her down and then she finishes getting dressed.

Mac Sam and Delmount discuss the pageant and their views on beautiful women. Popeye and Elain reveal that Carnelle tripped while wearing the red dress, and consequently the audience began to laugh at her and call her names. Delmount is furious at one man in particular and exits with intent to fight him. Carnelle appears and feels humiliated. Carnelle does not feel confident in her chances of winning. After Carnelle leaves, Delmount and Elain explain that they are reluctant to watch Carnelle humiliate herself further. Elain receives flowers from Franklin and tells Delmount she is returning to her family, which makes Delmount very angry with her. Carnelle reappears, happy because the crowd loved her act. Carnelle then nervously departs for the crowning. Alone, Delmount further criticizes beauty pageants. Mac Sam, Elain, and Popeye come back to the dressing room after Carnelle loses the pageant. Carnelle follows after them and loses her temper with everyone. Tessy informs Carnelle she has to follow the parade carrying a flag, which Carnelle readily does.

Elain arrives back in the dressing room slightly drunk. She and Delmount make amends. Elain leaves to have a fling with a man. Popeye and Delmount discuss the future, and Delmount invites Popeye to watch the fireworks with him. The two of them leave before Carnelle arrives once more. Carnelle is surprised when Mac Sam appears next, and explains that in her absence she was by the railroad tracks thinking about her life. Mac Sam says he does not regret the times he spent with her, then departs. Delmount and Popeye climb up a tent to watch the fireworks. Delmount and Popeye invite Carnelle to watch the show with them. While she is climbing up, Delmount kisses Popeye and tells her he loves her. Carnelle reaches the top and explains that she realized that the beauty pageant was not that important after all. The play ends with the three admiring the fireworks.

== Relationship with tradition and movements ==
=== Southern literature ===
This play exemplifies the qualities possessed by Southern literature. The setting, Brookhaven, is a small town in Mississippi. Even the author, Beth Henley, was raised in the South. The themes and focuses of the story incorporate Southern values, such as family and community. Carnelle respects her aunt and uncle, which is clear in the way she reveres the house and does not change the decorating style even after her aunt passes away. The interactions between Carnelle and her cousins further show the importance of family. The community plays a huge role in Southern society, an important fact which is presented in the play through this annual pageant and Carnelle's concern about her reputation. A good reputation, particularly in a small Southern town, is one of the most important possessions one can have. The Miss Firecracker Contest is a symbol for the deep-seated tradition that runs through the town of Brookhaven. This explains why it is so important to Carnelle to regain acceptance through this time-honored event. The dialect used throughout the play is strongly Southern, therefore thoroughly immersing the characters and story in Southern culture.

Many critics have also labeled Henley's work as Southern Gothic. Southern Gothic literature includes events in the story that are macabre, grotesque, or fantastic. Carnelle's aunt becoming hairy after receiving an organ transplant, Delmount's dreams, and the way Popeye earned her nickname are just a few examples of events in The Miss Firecracker Contest that exemplify Southern Gothic characteristics.

=== Pageants ===
While they take place all around the US, beauty pageants are a particularly important event in the South. Pageants in the South, particularly in majority-white communities, may reinforce specific conceptions of femininity — what has been called "a polished performance of white womanhood." In some local pageants, the winner may be chosen not because of her own beauty or merit, but because of her family connections and social standing in the community. Carnelle does not lose the Miss Firecracker contest because of her appearance; she loses because her family and her reputation cannot measure up to the other contestants.

== Themes and motifs ==
=== Identity and meeting cultural expectations ===
Carnelle struggles to obtain approval from the world and to shake her tarnished reputation as “Miss Hot Tamale,” or as the most promiscuous girl in town. Winning the Miss Firecracker Contest would redeem herself in the eyes of the town before she clears out of Brookhaven, Mississippi. The “ideal woman” she strives to become arrives in the form of her cousin Elain, and this allows for a character contrast to develop, emphasizing Carnelle's determination to “improve” her identity. Carnelle attempts to redefine her personal image by curing her syphilis, joining a church, volunteering for the cancer society, and inviting an orphan to dinner weekly. Trying to win the Miss Firecracker Contest is simply another way to show the town and herself that she amounts to someone special. Henley uses Carnelle to identify the typical struggle females go through to define themselves while maintaining cultural expectations of beauty, poise, and youth.

=== Beauty ===
Elain arrives on the scene to contrast Carnelle's floundering self-esteem and to emphasize what advantages beauty has in society. Elain complies with her late mother's wishes to attend junior college and to use her beauty to snag a wealthy husband, demonstrating the power of beauty and how Elain uses her beauty to please her mother. Elain is stuck in an unhappy marriage and is very narcissistic, and these two characteristics demonstrate Henley's point that beauty is not everything. Delmount also has an obsession with beauty, and gets himself into a lot of trouble when exotic beauties catch his eye. This obsession results in disturbingly gruesome dreams about deformed body parts, emphasizing Delmount's madness and excessively romantic mind. Henley demonstrates that while beauty is considered important in society, using it to gain an advantage or admiring it excessively does not ultimately lead to happiness.

=== The need to be loved ===
Carnelle never had a stable family life as a child. She was abandoned by her parents and, after her aunt and uncle died, left with no close family. As a result, Carnelle sought love in the form of men, which backfired and ruined her reputation. The Miss Firecracker Contest is Carnelle's last chance to gain acceptance and once again be loved by her community. Elain never had an issue getting love and attention, but she realizes her life is full of fine things yet nothing of any importance. She then tries to leave her husband and family, though in the end, Elain returns to her family because of her need to have a constant sense of security and love. Delmount also desires love, but in a different way than either Carnelle or Elain's desires. He has sexual dreams and fantasies which only serve to confuse him. When he finally falls for Popeye, his quest for love is finally complete.

== Critical reception ==
The Miss Firecracker Contest was originally produced in Los Angeles in 1980 and eventually produced on Broadway. Critics, eager to peg The Miss Firecracker Contest as a feminist play that satirizes beauty pageants, were sorely disappointed when Carnelle did not conform to the role of a strong female willing to discard the importance of the beauty pageant, but instead remains loyally intrigued by the concept of beauty and its power in her world. Others recognized this obsession with beauty and denounced the play as antifeminist, but the fact that Carnelle loses the contest and wins some self-confidence downplays the importance of the beauty contest and focuses on personal relationships as being Carnelle's redeeming quality. Beth Henley commented that she never meant to make a statement supporting feminism by including a beauty pageant in her play; instead, the central plot point revolves around wanting to belong to the world in general, a beauty pageant was simply an opportunity for Carnelle to show this world her self-worth.

Beth Henley has been consistently praised for her insight into the female mind and for mixing tragedy and comedy so smoothly that her audiences leave feeling optimistic despite the depressing situations in which Henley's characters find themselves. Henley's trademark finale is a scene that offers hope to her central female character through her relationships with other characters, and the audience clearly sees this as Carnelle happily climbs up to the roof to watch the final fireworks. Beth Henley helped make a name for herself with this play by incorporating grotesque Southern humor with female struggles. The focus on the dysfunctional Southern family while producing a positive message about self-confidence, courage, perseverance, and compassion pleased critics, who praised Henley for her quirky characters and warm messages. The play's popularity allowed for the production of Miss Firecracker, the film version of this play, which was produced in 1989 directed by Thomas Schlamme and starring Holly Hunter. Hunter has been cast in many of Henley's plays in addition to The Miss Firecracker Contest.
