= Am I Blue (play) =

Play written by Beth Henley

- Original language: English
- Written by: Beth Henley
- Characters: John Polk Richards; Ashbe Williams; Hilda; The Barker; The Bum; The Hippie (Clareece); The Whore
- Genre: Comedy

Premiere
- Date: 1974
- Place: United States

Am I Blue is a play by Beth Henley and was written in 1972 and first performed in 1974 at Southern Methodist University. It premiered Off-Broadway in 1982 at the Circle Repertory Company, in a night of plays called Confluence (also featuring Confluence by John Bishop and Thymus Vulgaris by Lanford Wilson).

== Setting ==
A bar, the street, the living room of a run down apartment in New Orleans, Fall, 1968

== Productions ==
The play was originally produced in 1974 at Southern Methodist University, and starred John Tillotson and Marcie Glaser. It was directed by Jill Christine Peters. It premiered Off-Broadway at the Circle Repertory Company on January 10, 1982. The show was directed by Stuart White, set design by Bob Phillips, costumes by Joan E. Weiss, lighting design by Mal Sturchio, and sound by Chuck London and Stewart Werner. The cast starred Jeff McCracken (John Polk Richards), June Stein (Ashbe Williams), Pearl Shear (Hilda), Jimmy Ray Weeks (The Barker), Edward Seamon (The Bum), Ellen Conway (The Hippee), and Katherine Cortez (The Whore).
