= Miss Firecracker =

1989 film

- Theatrical release poster
- Directed by: Thomas Schlamme
- Screenplay by: Beth Henley
- Based on: The Miss Firecracker Contest by Beth Henley
- Produced by: Lewis Allen; Fred Berner; Ross E. Milloy
- Starring: Scott Glenn; Holly Hunter; Tim Robbins; Mary Steenburgen; Alfre Woodard
- Cinematography: Arthur Albert
- Edited by: Peter C. Frank
- Music by: David Mansfield
- Production companies: Corsair Pictures; Worldvision Enterprises
- Distributed by: Corsair Pictures
- Release date: April 28, 1989
- Running time: 102 minutes
- Country: United States
- Language: English
- Budget: $4 million
- Box office: $1.8 million

Miss Firecracker is a 1989 American Southern Gothic comedy film directed by Thomas Schlamme. It stars Holly Hunter, Mary Steenburgen, Tim Robbins, Alfre Woodard, and Scott Glenn. The film, set in Yazoo City, Mississippi, was written by Pulitzer Prize-winning playwright Beth Henley and is based on her 1984 play The Miss Firecracker Contest. Holly Hunter reprised the role of Carnelle Scott, whom she played in an Off-Broadway production of Henley’s play.

== Plot ==
Carnelle Scott enters the Miss Firecracker beauty pageant, which her hometown of Yazoo City, Mississippi stages every Fourth of July, hoping to emulate her cousin Elain Rutledge's win years prior. Carnelle was taken in as an orphan by her genteel cousins after the death of her mother and grows up promiscuous, brash, unfeminine and lacking in grace. Carnelle's closest friends and relatives think she is heading for a big disappointment instead of a triumph at the pageant, but Carnelle is ever hopeful.

When her male cousin, the eccentric sociopath Delmount Williams, decides to sell the house they both live in to make money, Carnelle becomes even more determined to win, viewing it as a way to escape her small town existence. Elain returns to the town to give a speech at the pageant after a breakup with her husband Franklin. Carnelle insists Elain let her wear the red dress in which she won the contest, thinking that will guarantee her success. Elain delays giving Carnelle the dress and makes excuses as to why she cannot have it while pretending to be supportive.

Carnelle surprisingly gets on the shortlist for the pageant when one of the other contestants pulls out. Without a red dress she breaks into a locked room in the house previously occupied by a sick relative and takes an old dress to wear. She comes last at the final and is frustrated by her failure. Back at the house, she discovers Elain had brought the dress with her all along and had been lying to her. She confronts Elain about this, realizing the pageant is not the most important thing after all, then leaves the house and goes to the town observatory and watches the pageant fireworks display.

== Cast ==
- Holly Hunter as Carnelle Scott
- Mary Steenburgen as Elain Rutledge
- Tim Robbins as Delmount Williams
- Alfre Woodard as Popeye Jackson
- Scott Glenn as Mac Sam
- Christine Lahti as Clara Archer
- Veanne Cox as Tessy Mahoney
- Ann Wedgeworth as Miss Blue
- Trey Wilson as Benjamin Drapper
- Amy Wright as Missy Mahoney
- Kathleen Chalfant as Miss Lily
- Robert Fieldsteel as Tommy Turner
- Greg Germann as Ronnie Wayne
- Avril Gentles as Mrs. Biggs
- Bert Remsen as Mr. Morton
- Angela Turner as Caroline Jefferson
- Cham Trotter as Franklin Rutledge

== Production and release ==
Costing US$4 million, Miss Firecracker was the first production for Corsair Pictures, a division of United Artists Communications. Scheduled for release in February 1989, it debuted on April 28 of that year and grossed US$1.85 million in North America. A VHS release from HBO Home Video followed in November. Miss Firecracker was released on DVD on May 25, 2004, from Millennium Entertainment.

== Critical reception ==
The film has an 82% rating on Rotten Tomatoes based on 11 reviews. Roger Ebert gave the film 3 and ½ stars out of four and said, "What finally makes Miss Firecracker special is that it is not about who wins the contest, but about how all beauty contests are about the need to be loved and about how silly a beauty contest can seem if somebody really loves you." He lauded director Thomas Schlamme and cinematographer Arthur Albert for capturing the local atmosphere of Yazoo City with a "moony, romantic glow." Ebert praised not just the performance of Holly Hunter, but also called Tim Robbins and Alfre Woodard "the hidden treasures of the movie."

Michael Wilmington of the Los Angeles Times wrote, "When [Beth Henley's] dialogue is working right, [she] gets the audience laughing and snorting by turns. What usually saves her is the innate theatricality of her main subject, Southern women, and of her approach.”

== See also ==
- List of American films of 1989
