= 2008 New York Film Critics Circle Awards =

74th New York Film Critics Circle Awards

74th NYFCC Awards

January 5, 2009

Best Picture:
Milk

The 74th New York Film Critics Circle Awards, honoring the best in film for 2008, were announced on 10 December 2008 and presented on 5 January 2009.

== Winners ==
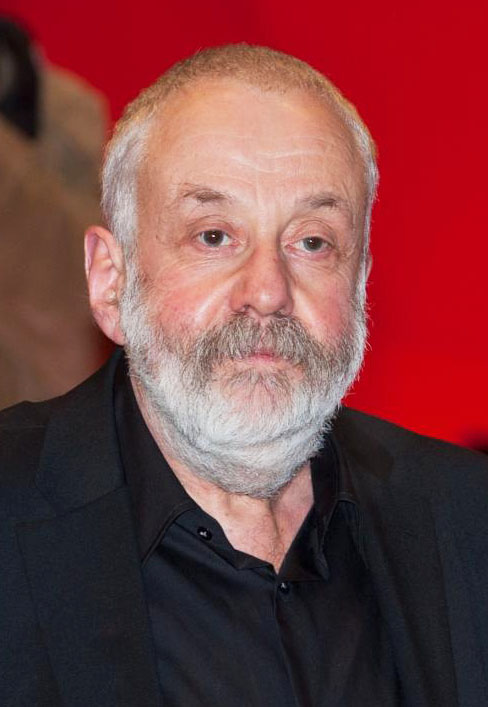
Mike Leigh, Best Director winner

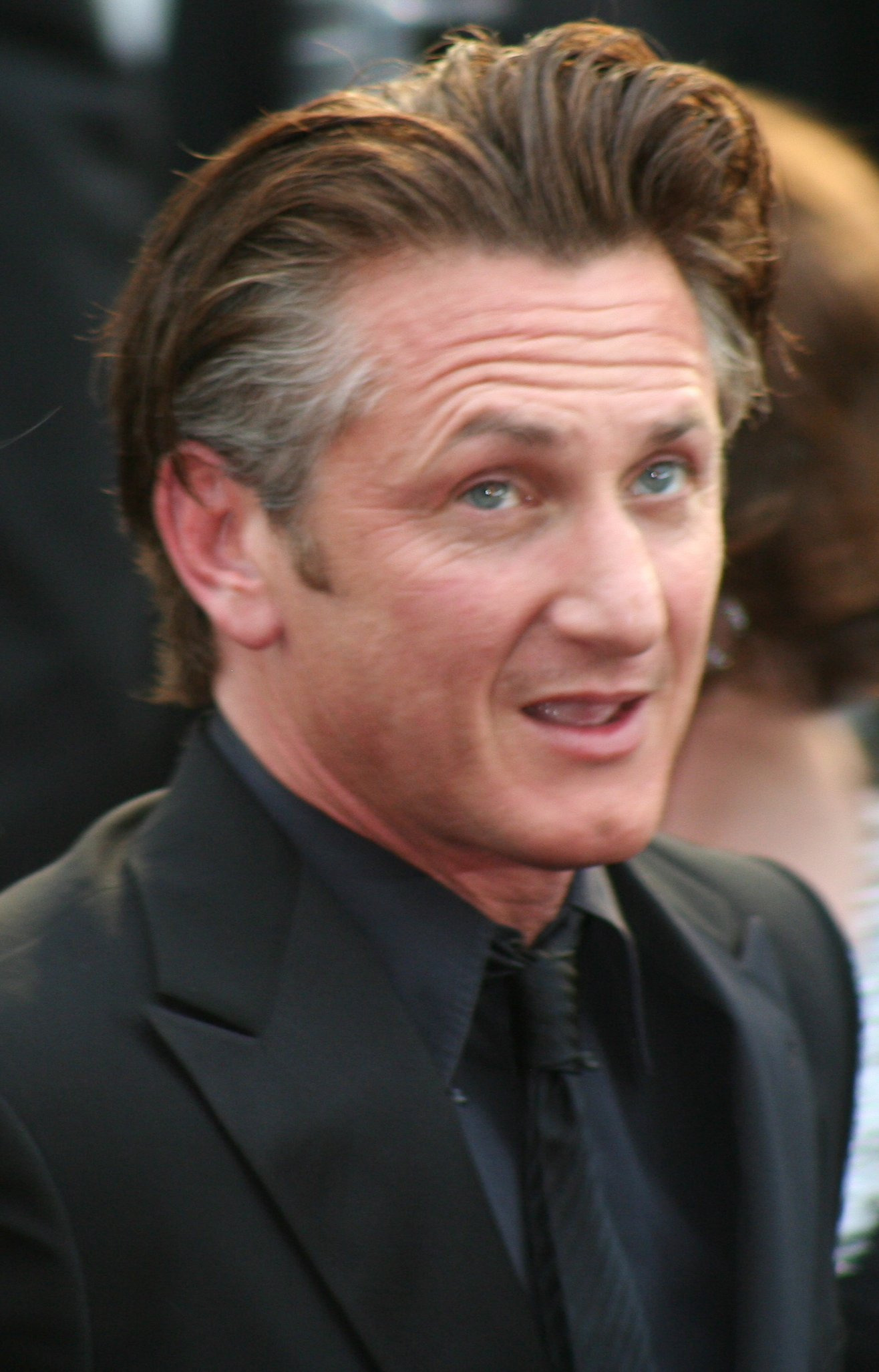
Sean Penn, Best Actor winner

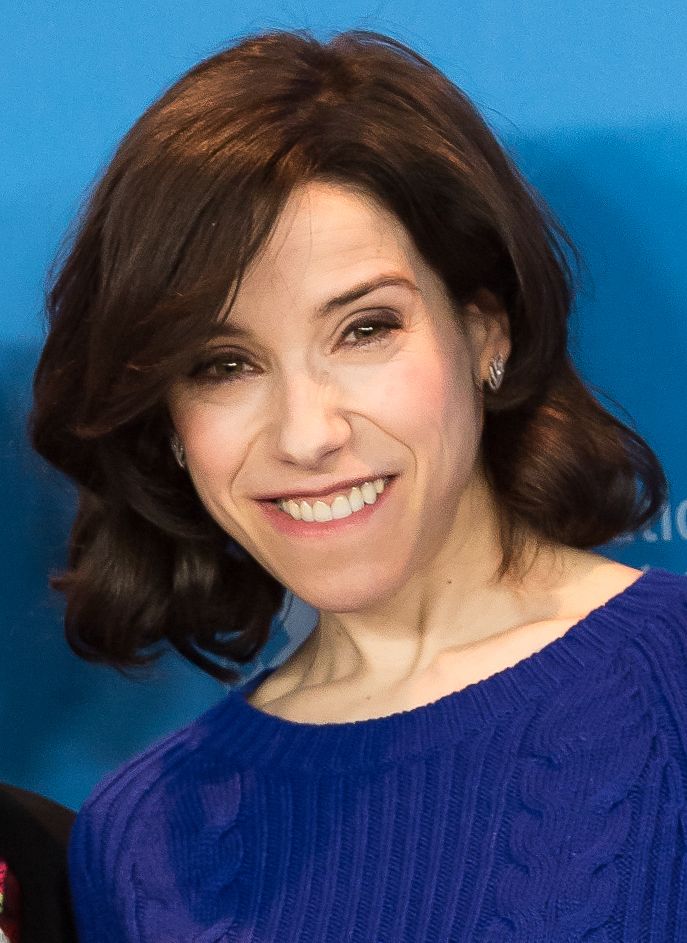
Sally Hawkins, Best Actress winner

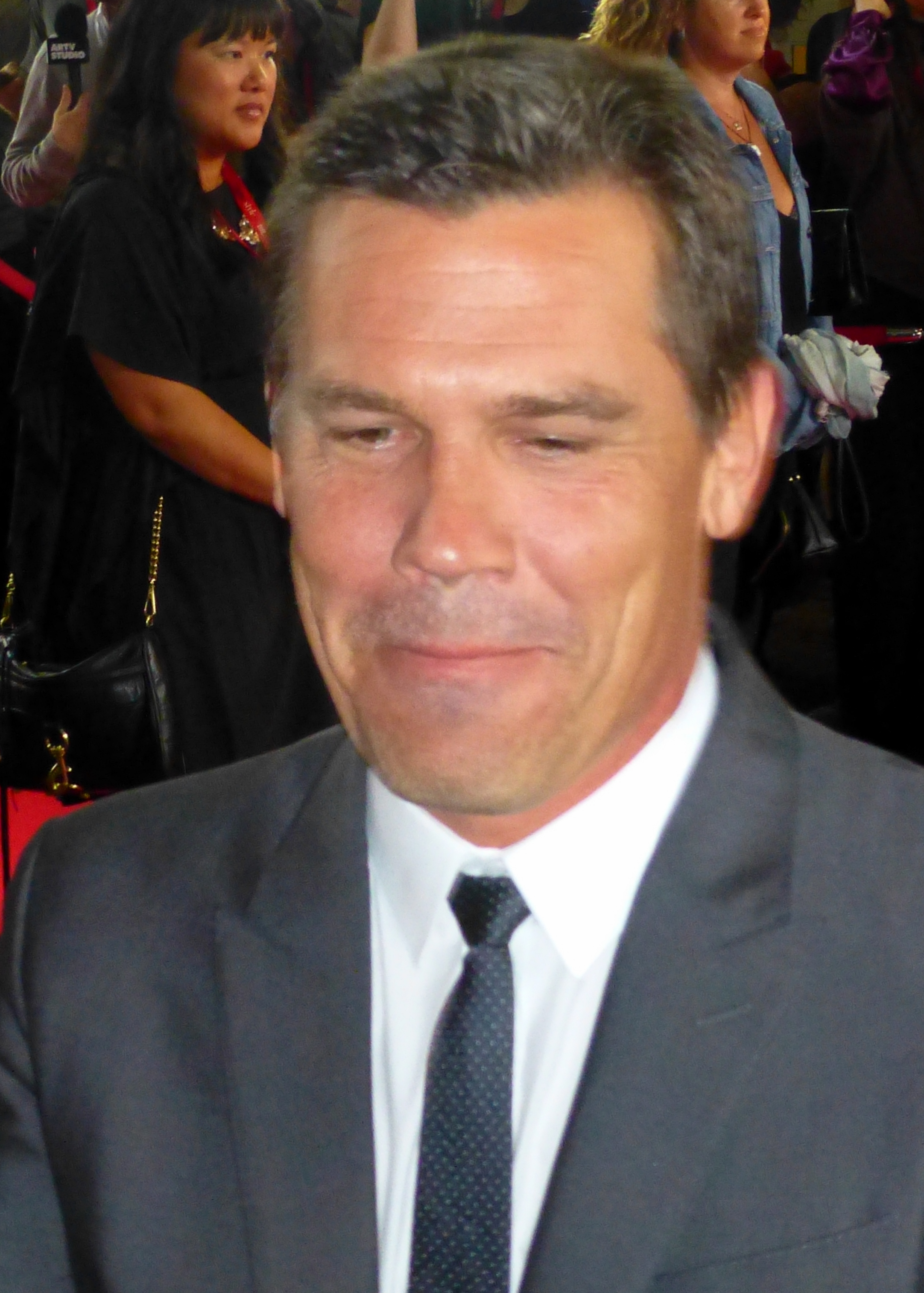
Josh Brolin, Best Supporting Actor winner

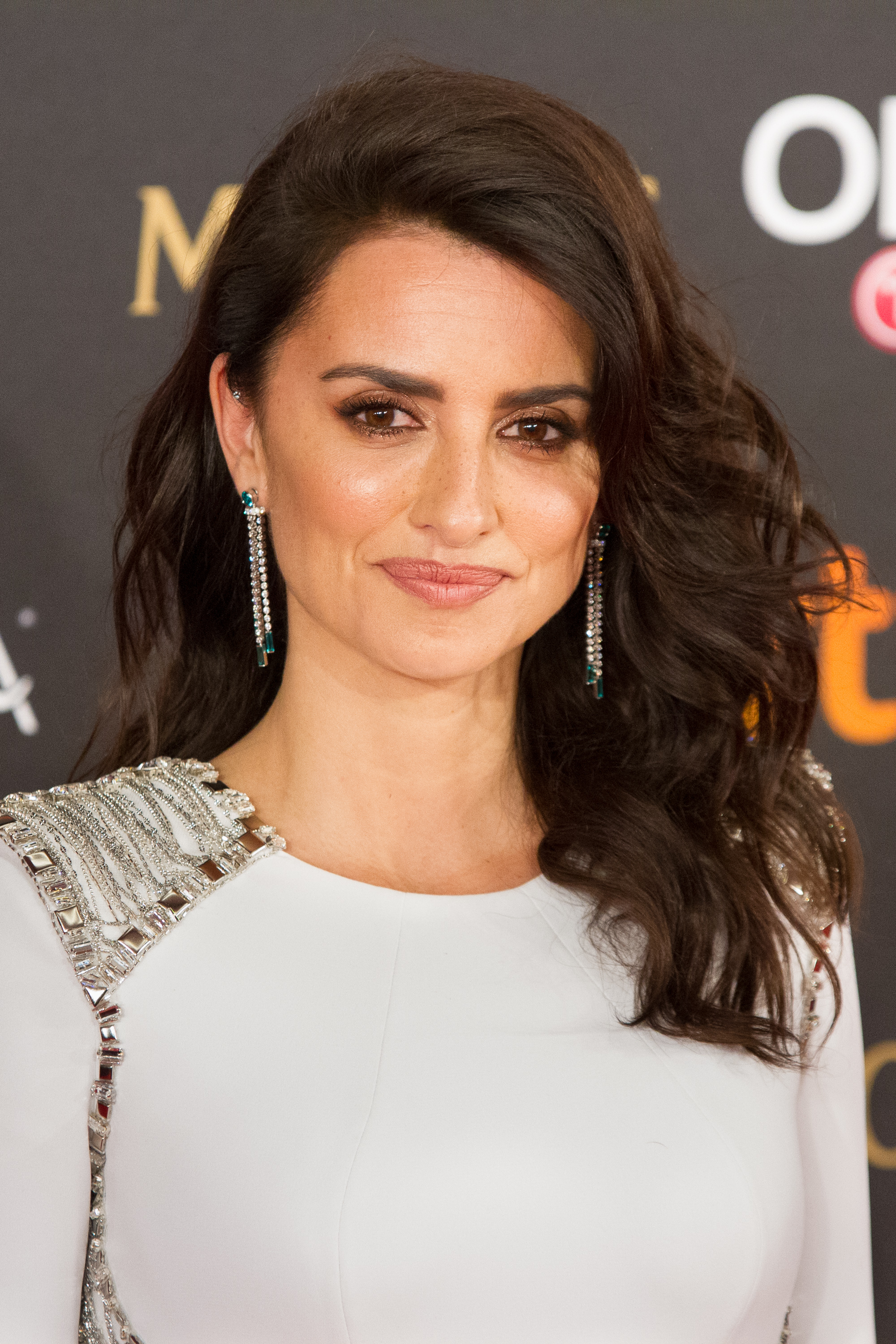
Penélope Cruz, Best Supporting Actress winner

=== Best Actor ===
1. Sean Penn – Milk
2. Mickey Rourke – The Wrestler
3. Clint Eastwood – Gran Torino

=== Best Actress ===
1. Sally Hawkins – Happy-Go-Lucky
2. Melissa Leo – Frozen River
3. Anne Hathaway – Rachel Getting Married
3. Kate Winslet – Revolutionary Road

=== Best Animated Film ===
1. WALL-E
2. Waltz with Bashir (Vals Im Bashir)

=== Best Cinematography ===
1. Anthony Dod Mantle – Slumdog Millionaire
2. Claudio Miranda – The Curious Case of Benjamin Button
3. Wally Pfister – The Dark Knight

=== Best Director ===
1. Mike Leigh – Happy-Go-Lucky
2. Danny Boyle – Slumdog Millionaire
3. David Fincher – The Curious Case of Benjamin Button

=== Best Film ===
1. Milk
2. Rachel Getting Married
3. Happy-Go-Lucky
3. Slumdog Millionaire

=== Best First Film ===
1. Courtney Hunt – Frozen River
2. Lance Hammer – Ballast
3. Joachim Trier – Reprise

=== Best Foreign Language Film ===
1. 4 Months, 3 Weeks and 2 Days (4 luni, 3 saptamani si 2 zile) • Romania
2. A Christmas Tale (Un conte de Noël) • France
3. The Class (Entre les murs) • France

=== Best Non-Fiction Film ===
1. Man on Wire
2. Waltz with Bashir (Vals Im Bashir)
3. Trouble the Water

=== Best Screenplay ===
1. Jenny Lumet – Rachel Getting Married
2. Mike Leigh – Happy-Go-Lucky
3. Robert D. Siegel – The Wrestler

=== Best Supporting Actor ===
1. Josh Brolin – Milk
2. Heath Ledger – The Dark Knight
3. Robert Downey Jr. – Tropic Thunder

=== Best Supporting Actress ===
1. Penélope Cruz – Vicky Cristina Barcelona
2. Viola Davis – Doubt
3. Rosemarie DeWitt – Rachel Getting Married
3. Debra Winger – Rachel Getting Married
