= Lizbeth MacKay =

American actress (born 1949)

Lizbeth Mackay (born March 7, 1949) is an American actress. She works primarily in the theatre and television.

== Life and career ==
Mackay was born in Buffalo, New York, the daughter of Robert J. Mackay, a salesman, and Alice (née Steurnagel), a dancer. She has two children, Caitlin and John. Nicknamed Liz, Mackay is a graduate of Adelphi University and the Yale Graduate School of Drama.

=== Stage ===
Mackay made her stage debut at the American Shakespeare Festival, Stratford, Connecticut, in 1970. She appeared in many productions at The Cleveland Play House from 1975 to 1978, including Man and Superman, Dark at the Top of the Stairs, Relatively Speaking, Of Mice and Men, Great Expectations, and Little Foxes. She played Alice in You Can't Take It with You at Center Stage, Baltimore, Maryland, in 1979, Crimes of the Heart at the Ahmanson Theatre, Los Angeles (1983), and The Dining Room, Plaza Theatre, Dallas, Texas (1983).

Mackay starred in Night, Mother with Katherine Helmond in early 1998 at the Orpheum Theatre in Foxboro, Massachusetts for which she won an Elliot Norton Award. later that year, she starred in A View From The Roof at Barrington Stage Company and the Orpheum Theatre. She appeared in Wendy Wasserstein's Third presented by the Philadelphia Theatre Company in 2008.

Mackay made her Broadway debut in a 1970 production of Othello. She made her Off-Broadway debut in the role of Lenny Magrath in Crimes of the Heart at the Manhattan Theatre Club in 1980, and went on to play the role on Broadway in 1981. She won the 1982 Theatre World Award for her performance in Crimes of the Heart. Additional New York City stage credits include Sons of the Prophet (2011), The Shoemaker (2010), All My Sons (2008), Two-Headed at the Women's Project Theater (2000), The Price (1999), The Heiress (1995), Abe Lincoln in Illinois (1993), and Death and the Maiden (1992).

=== Television and film ===
Mackay's feature film credits include Malcolm X (1992), Marvin's Room (1996), and One True Thing (1998). On television, she appeared in the soap operas All My Children as Leora Sanders in 1981 and One Life to Live (2004) and the primetime series The Cosby Mysteries (1995), Ed (2000), Law & Order: Special Victims Unit (2002), Law & Order: Criminal Intent (2005), and several episodes of the original Law & Order (1992, 1998, 2003).
