= Charles B. Henley =

American politician (1925–1978)

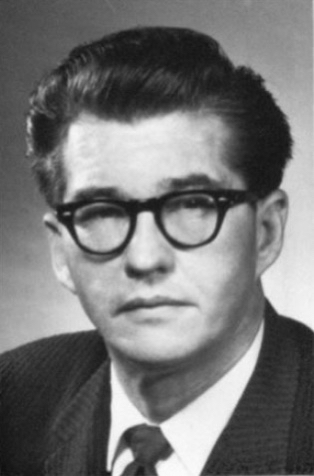

Member of the Mississippi House of Representatives
- In office 1964–1968

Member of the Mississippi State Senate
- In office 1968–1972

Personal details
- Born: October 14, 1925 Hazlehurst, Mississippi, U.S.
- Died: June 30, 1978 (aged 52)
- Party: Democratic
- Spouse: Elizabeth Josephine Henley
- Children: 4, including Beth Henley
- Education: University of Mississippi
- Occupation: Attorney

Charles B. Henley (October 14, 1925 – June 30, 1978) was an American attorney and politician. He served as a member of the Mississippi House of Representatives and the Mississippi State Senate.

== Life and career ==
Henley was born on October 14, 1925, in Hazlehurst, Mississippi. He attended the University of Mississippi.

Henley served in the Mississippi House of Representatives from 1964 to 1968. He then served in the Mississippi State Senate from 1968 to 1972.

Henley died on June 30, 1978, at the age of 52.
