= Washington D.C. Area Film Critics Association Awards 2008 =

Annual US film awards ceremony

7th WAFCA Awards
- Date: December 8, 2008

Highlights
- Best Film: Slumdog Millionaire
- Best Director: Danny Boyle for Slumdog Millionaire
- Best Actor: Mickey Rourke
- Best Actress: Meryl Streep

The 7th Washington D.C. Area Film Critics Association Awards were given on December 8, 2008.

== Winners ==
Best Actor

- Mickey Rourke – The Wrestler

Best Actress

- Meryl Streep – Doubt

Best Animated Film

- WALL•E

Best Art Direction

- The Curious Case of Benjamin Button

Best Breakthrough Performance

- Dev Patel – Slumdog Millionaire

Best Cast

- Doubt

Best Director

- Danny Boyle – Slumdog Millionaire

Best Documentary Film

- Man on Wire

Best Film

- Slumdog Millionaire

Best Foreign Language Film

- Let the Right One In (Låt den rätte komma in) • Sweden

Best Screenplay – Adapted

- Slumdog Millionaire – Simon Beaufoy

Best Screenplay – Original

- Rachel Getting Married – Jenny Lumet

Best Supporting Actor

- Heath Ledger – The Dark Knight

Best Supporting Actress

- Rosemarie DeWitt – Rachel Getting Married
