= Rosemarie DeWitt =

American actress (born 1971)

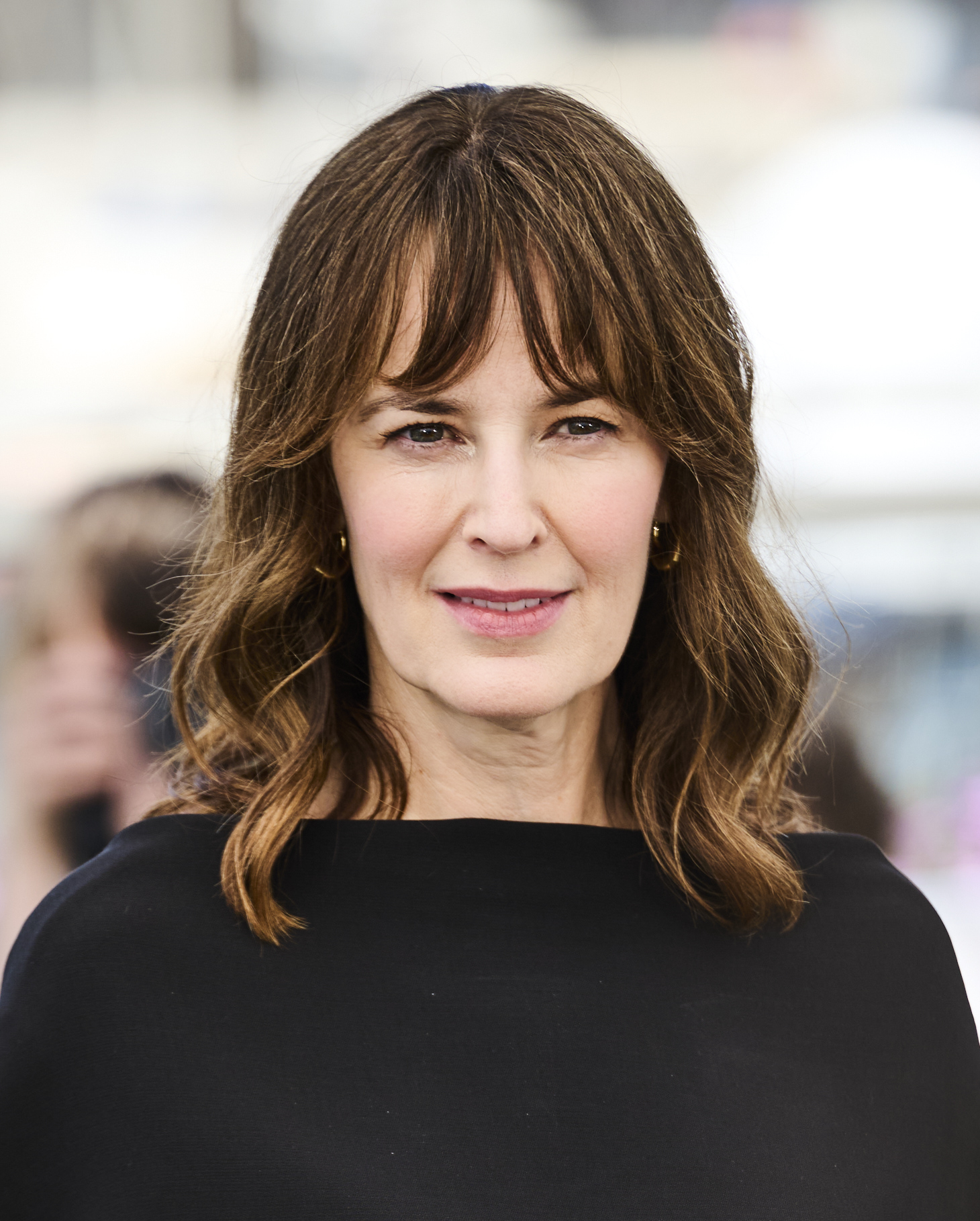
- DeWitt in 2026
- Born: Rosemarie Braddock DeWitt; October 26, 1971 (age 54); New York City, U.S.
- Education: Hofstra University (BA)
- Occupation: Actress
- Years active: 2001–present
- Spouses: Chris Messina (m. 1995; div. 2006) Ron Livingston (m. 2009)
- Children: 2
- Family: James J. Braddock (grandfather)

Rosemarie Braddock DeWitt (born October 26, 1971) is an American actress. DeWitt played Emily Lehman in the Fox television series Standoff (2006–07), co-starring with her future husband Ron Livingston. She appeared as Charmaine Craine on United States of Tara. She also was the title character in 2008's Rachel Getting Married, garnering several awards and nominations for best supporting actress. She starred as Ryan Gosling's character Sebastian's sister Laura Wilder in the Oscar-winning movie La La Land. She also starred in the horror/thriller Poltergeist (2015), a remake of the 1982 film of the same name.

== Early life ==
DeWitt was born in Flushing, Queens, New York, the daughter of Rosemarie (Braddock) and Kenny DeWitt. She is a granddaughter of former World Heavyweight Champion James J. Braddock, and played the role of neighbor Sara Wilson in the film Cinderella Man, which depicted James J. Braddock's life.

DeWitt lived in Hanover Township, New Jersey, and is a graduate of Whippany Park High School. She performed in several high school productions. She attended the New College at Hofstra University where she received a Bachelor of Arts in creative studies. While at Hofstra, she also joined Alpha Phi. She had additional training at The Actors Center in New York.

== Career ==
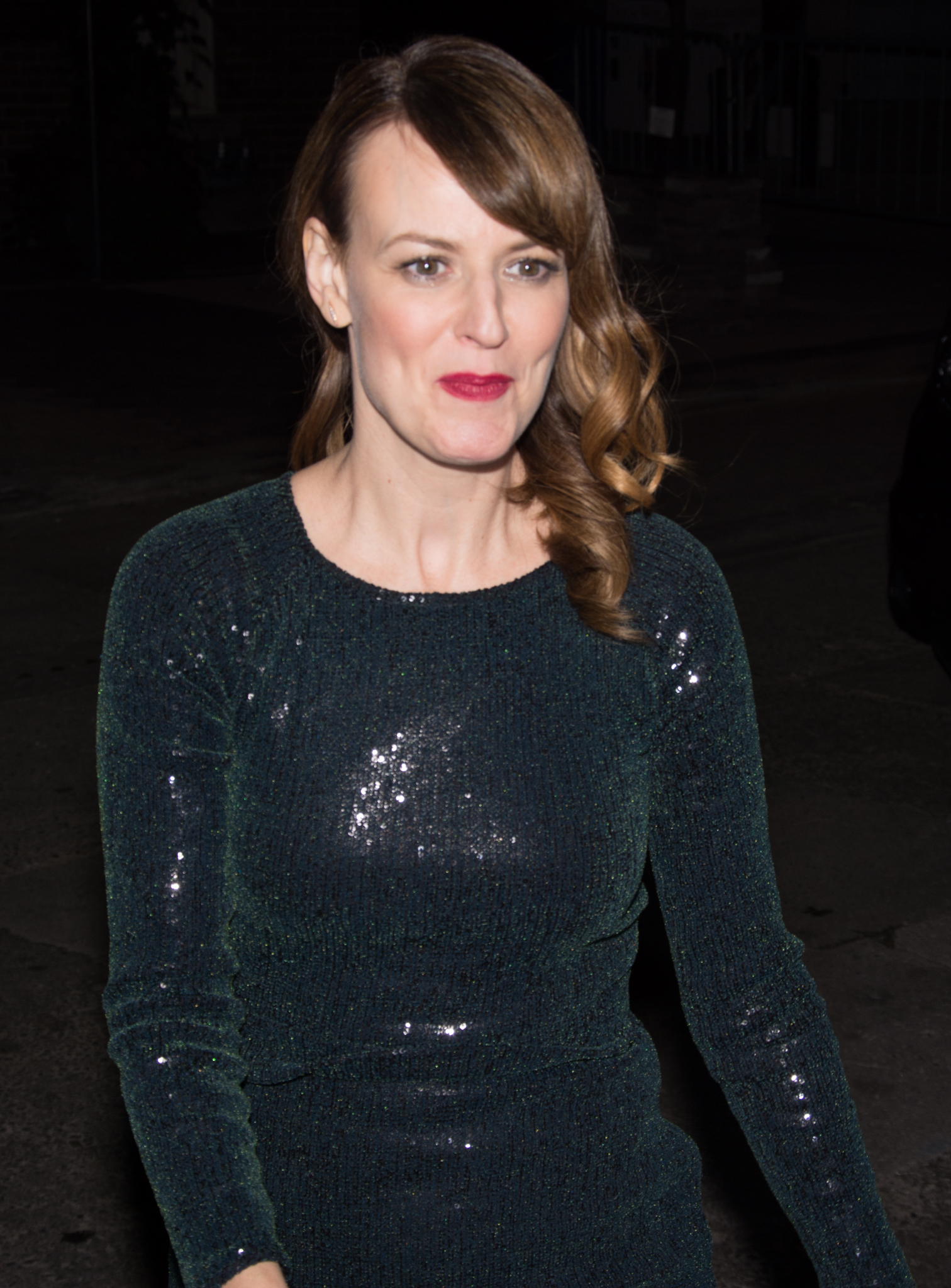
DeWitt at the 2014 Toronto International Film Festival

DeWitt played the role of Rachel in the Jonathan Demme-directed movie Rachel Getting Married (2008) alongside Anne Hathaway, for which she won several critics' awards and a Satellite Award for Best Supporting Actress. Other film credits include Jason Reitman's Men, Women, & Children, Michael Cuesta's Kill the Messenger opposite Jeremy Renner, Gus Van Sant's Promised Land opposite Matt Damon, and Lynn Shelton's Your Sister's Sister opposite Emily Blunt and Mark Duplass. In 2016, DeWitt appeared in Damien Chazelle's musical romance La La Land opposite Ryan Gosling and Emma Stone. DeWitt appeared in the indie-thriller Sweet Virginia, directed by Jamie Dagg, which premiered at the 2017 Tribeca Film Festival. In 2018, DeWitt starred opposite Danny McBride in Arizona.

On television, DeWitt was seen in three seasons of the Showtime comedy series United States of Tara alongside Toni Collette. In addition to her role on United States of Tara, DeWitt also recurred on the AMC series Mad Men, playing Midge Daniels, Don Draper's (Jon Hamm) bohemian mistress, in the show's first season. She appeared in the second episode in the fourth season of the British series Black Mirror for director Jodie Foster.

DeWitt has performed in numerous off-Broadway plays. Most notably, she starred in John Patrick Shanley's Danny and the Deep Blue Sea at the Second Stage Theatre; George S. Kaufman's The Butter and Egg Man at the Atlantic Theater Company; and Craig Lucas' Small Tragedy, for which the entire cast won an Obie Award. From May 4–23, 2010, DeWitt appeared in MCC Theater's Off Broadway play Family Week, written by Beth Henley and directed by Jonathan Demme. In its review of the play, the New York Times stated that DeWitt's lead performance "has many affecting moments as the beleaguered Claire."

In 2024, DeWitt starred in the Disney+ film Out of My Mind, following the story of sixth grader Melody Brooks who has cerebral palsy. DeWitt played Melody's mother, Diane Brooks. The film won a Peabody Award at the 85th Annual Ceremony.

In 2025, DeWitt appeared as Jill Bodwin in the Netflix mystery thriller series Untamed, starring alongside Eric Bana and Sam Neill. She will appear as Laytha Sadal, the First Lady of Betazed, in the second and final season of the Star Trek spinoff series Star Trek: Starfleet Academy in 2027.

== Personal life ==
She was married to actor Chris Messina from 1995 to 2006. She married actor Ron Livingston, her co-star in Standoff, on November 2, 2009, in San Francisco. In May 2013, the couple announced that they had recently adopted an infant daughter. In December 2016, they made public that they had adopted a second infant daughter in 2015.

== Filmography ==
=== Film ===
Year	Title	Role
2004	Fresh Cut Grass	Actor
2005	The Great New Wonderful	Debbie
2005	Cinderella Man	Sara Wilson
2005	Buy It Now	Mom
2006	The Wedding Weekend	Dana
2006	Doris	Doris
2006	Off the Black	Debra
2007	Purple Violets	Murph's Hamptons fling
2008	Afterschool	Teacher
2008	Rachel Getting Married	Rachel Buchman
2009	Tenure	Beth
2009	How I Got Lost	Leslie
2010	The Company Men	Maggie Walker
2011	A Little Bit of Heaven	Renee Blair
2011	Your Sister's Sister	Hannah
2011	Margaret	Mrs. Marretti
2012	The Odd Life of Timothy Green	Brenda Best
2012	Nobody Walks	Julie
2012	The Watch	Abby Trautwig
2012	Promised Land	Alice
2013	Touchy Feely	Abby
2014	Men, Women & Children	Helen Truby
2014	Kill the Messenger	Susan Webb
2015	Digging for Fire	Lee
2015	Poltergeist	Amy Bowen
2016	La La Land	Laura Wilder
2017	Sweet Virginia	Bernadette
2018	Arizona	Cassie Fowler
2018	Song of Back and Neck	Regan Stearns
2018	The Professor	Veronica Sinclair-Brown
2019	Wyrm	Margie
2021	The Same Storm	Cindy Lamson
2022	The Estate	Beatrice
2024	Out of My Mind	Diane Brooks
2024	Smile 2	Elizabeth Riley
2025	She Dances	Deb
2026	Diamond	Angel
TBA	Rubber Hut	

=== Television ===
Year	Title	Role	Notes
2001	Law & Order: Special Victims Unit	Gloria Palmera	Episode: "Victims"
2003	Queens Supreme	Rona Heller	Episode: "That Voodoo That You Do"
2003	Sex and the City	Fern	Episode: "Hop, Skip, and a Week"
2005	The Commuters	Trisha	TV movie
2005	Rescue Me	Heather	2 episodes
2006	Love Monkey	Abby Powell	Episode: "The Window"
2006–2007	Standoff	Emily Lehman	Main cast
2007, 2010	Mad Men	Midge Daniels	Recurring role (season 1); Episode: "Blowing Smoke" (season 4)
2009	Wainy Days	June	Episode: "Animator"
2009–2011	United States of Tara	Charmaine Craine	Main cast
2014	Olive Kitteridge	Rachel Coulson	Miniseries; 2 episodes
2016–2017	The Last Tycoon	Rose Brady	Main cast
2017	Black Mirror	Marie	Episode: "Arkangel"
2020	Little Fires Everywhere	Linda McCullough	Main cast
2022	The Staircase	Candace Hunt Zamperini	Miniseries; main cast
2022–2023	Pantheon	Ellen	Main cast, voice role
2023–2025	And Just Like That...	Kathy	3 episodes
2023	Lessons in Chemistry	Avery Parker	Episode: "Introduction to Chemistry"
2024	The Boys	Daphne Campbell	Recurring role (season 4); 6 episodes
2025–present	Untamed	Jill Bodwin	Season 1; 6 episodes
2025–2026	Percy Jackson and the Olympians	Circe	2 episodes
2027	Star Trek: Starfleet Academy	Laytha Sadal	Recurring role

=== Theatre ===
Year	Title	Role	Playwright	Venue
2002	The Butter and Egg Man	Jane Weston	George S. Kaufman	Atlantic Theater Company, Off-Broadway
2004	Danny and the Deep Blue Sea	Roberta	John Patrick Shanley	Second Stage Theatre, Off-Broadway
2004	Small Tragedy	Fanny	Craig Lucas	Playwrights Horizons, Off-Broadway
2005	Swimming in the Shallows	Donna	Adam Bock	Second Stage Theatre, Off-Broadway
2010	Family Week	Claire	Beth Henley	Lucille Lortel Theatre, Off-Broadway

== Awards ==
Rachel Getting Married

- Santa Barbara International Film Festival: Virtuoso Award
- Satellite Award for Best Supporting Actress – Motion Picture
- Toronto Film Critics Association Award for Best Supporting Actress
- Utah Film Critics Association Award for Best Supporting Actress
- Vancouver Film Critics Circle Award for Best Supporting Actress
- Washington D.C. Area Film Critics Association Award for Best Supporting Actress
- Nominated – Broadcast Film Critics Association Award for Best Cast
- Nominated – Chicago Film Critics Association Award for Best Supporting Actress
- Nominated – Dallas-Fort Worth Film Critics Association Award for Best Supporting Actress
- Nominated – Detroit Film Critics Society Award for Best Supporting Actress
- Nominated – Detroit Film Critics Society Award for Best Newcomer
- Nominated – Gotham Independent Film Award for Best Ensemble Cast
- Nominated – Gotham Independent Film Award for Breakthrough Actor
- Nominated – Independent Spirit Award for Best Supporting Female
- Nominated – International Cinephile Society Award for Best Supporting Actress
- Nominated – New York Film Critics Circle Award for Best Supporting Actress (3rd place)

Your Sister's Sister

- Gotham Independent Film Award for Best Ensemble Performance
- Nominated – Chlotrudis Award for Best Supporting Actress
- Nominated – Independent Spirit Award for Best Supporting Female
- Nominated – International Cinephile Society Award for Best Supporting Actress
