= Rachel Getting Married =

2008 film by Jonathan Demme

- Theatrical release poster
- Directed by: Jonathan Demme
- Written by: Jenny Lumet
- Produced by: Jonathan Demme; Neda Armian; Marc Platt
- Starring: Anne Hathaway; Rosemarie DeWitt; Bill Irwin; Tunde Adebimpe; Mather Zickel; Anna Deavere Smith; Debra Winger
- Cinematography: Declan Quinn
- Edited by: Tim Squyres
- Music by: Zafer Tawil; Donald Harrison Jr.
- Production companies: Clinica Estetico; Marc Platt Productions
- Distributed by: Sony Pictures Classics
- Release dates: September 3, 2008 (Venice); October 3, 2008 (United States)
- Running time: 114 minutes
- Country: United States
- Language: English
- Budget: $12 million
- Box office: $17.5 million

Rachel Getting Married is a 2008 American drama film directed and produced by Jonathan Demme and written by Jenny Lumet. It stars Anne Hathaway as a young woman temporarily released from rehab who returns home for the weekend for her sister's wedding. Rosemarie DeWitt, Bill Irwin, Tunde Adebimpe, Mather Zickel, Anna Deavere Smith, and Debra Winger appear in supporting roles.

The film had its world premiere at the 65th Venice International Film Festival on September 3, 2008, and was theatrically released in the United States on October 3, by Sony Pictures Classics. It received positive reviews from critics, who praised the performances of the cast (particularly those of Hathaway and DeWitt) and Lumet's screenplay. It earned a leading six nominations, including Best Feature, at the 24th Independent Spirit Awards. For her performance, Hathaway was nominated for Best Actress at the 81st Academy Awards, the 80th National Board of Review Awards, the 66th Golden Globe Awards, and the 15th Screen Actors Guild Awards, and won the same category at the 14th Critics' Choice Awards.

== Plot ==
Kym Buchman is released from rehab for a few days to attend her older sister Rachel's wedding at their childhood home. While friends and family prepare for the festivities, Kym struggles to reintegrate with them, as her history of substance abuse has made her the black sheep of the family.

Despite Kym's nine months of sobriety, her father Paul is uncomfortable with her driving, leading her to bike to a mandated drug test and Narcotics Anonymous meeting. She returns home and is introduced to Rachel's fiancé Sidney and his best man Kieran. Recognizing each other from the meeting, Kym and Kieran have sex, and he reveals that Rachel's best friend Emma will be her maid of honor. Kym confronts her sister, and it becomes clear that Kym's self-destructive behavior has caused a deep rift between them.

Rachel resents the attention her sister is drawing away from the wedding, exacerbated by Kym's behavior at the rehearsal dinner: amid toasts from friends and family, Kym awkwardly jokes about her addiction and "makes amends" with Rachel and others in the gathering for her past actions, as part of her twelve-step program. Later Rachel, angry at what she thinks is Kym's insincere and inappropriate "amends", erupts at Kym and the two engage in an intense argument, which Rachel ends by announcing she is pregnant, to the delight of everyone but Kym.

At another NA meeting, Kym reveals that she lives with the guilt of having accidentally killed her younger brother, Ethan. As a teen, an intoxicated Kym was driving Ethan home but lost control of the car and drove into a lake, where he drowned. Back home, a disagreement between Sidney and Paul about loading the dishwasher turns into a friendly competition, which is cut short when Paul finds a plate that belonged to his late son.

The day before the wedding, the bridal party visits a salon, where Kym is approached by a man she met at rehab years ago. He thanks her for having inspired him with her stories of overcoming trauma; overhearing this and realizing these stories were lies, Rachel storms out, angry that Kym would lie about having been molested by an uncle or tending to an anorexic sister.

Tensions flare between the sisters when Rachel tells the family that Kym was untruthful during her treatment, and that she has never forgiven Kym for their brother's death. Kym acknowledges that any amount of progress she makes may never make her worthy of forgiveness and drives off in her father's car to her mother Abby's home. Kym's attempt to find closure backfires when Abby refuses to take responsibility for leaving Kym with Ethan when she knew her daughter was an addict, culminating in a physical altercation.

Distraught, Kym crashes the car in what may have been an attempted suicide, but survives. The morning of the wedding, she is woken in the car by police and passes a field sobriety test, then is driven home and makes her way to Rachel's room. Seeing Kym's bruised face, Rachel tenderly bathes and dresses her sister, discovering Kym's tattoo of a rose with "Ethan" beneath it.

Amid a festive Indian theme, Rachel and Sidney are wed. Kym is the maid of honor and is overcome with emotion as the couple exchange their vows. She tries to enjoy herself throughout the reception, but continues to feel alienated and plagued by her dispute with Abby, who leaves early despite Rachel's effort to bring them together. The next morning, as Kym returns to rehab, Rachel runs out of the house to hug her.

== Cast ==
- Anne Hathaway as Kym Buchman
- Rosemarie DeWitt as Rachel Buchman
- Bill Irwin as Paul Buchman
- Debra Winger as Abby Buchman
- Tunde Adebimpe as Sidney Williams
- Mather Zickel as Kieran
- Anna Deavere Smith as Carol
- Anisa George as Emma
- Beau Sia as Wedding Czar
- Tamyra Gray as Singing Friend
- Sebastian Stan as Walter
- Annaleigh Ashford as Grocery Clerk
- Roger Corman as Wedding Guest
- Dorian Missick as Rehearsal Dinner Guest
- Paul Lazar as Rehearsal Dinner Guest
- Fab Five Freddy as Rehearsal Dinner Guest
- Jimmy Joe Roche as Rehearsal Dinner Guest
- Sister Carol as Wedding Guest (as Sister Carol East)
- Robyn Hitchcock as Wedding Guest
- Daphne Rubin-Vega as Wedding Guest

== Production ==
The screenplay was written by Jenny Lumet, the daughter of director Sidney Lumet and granddaughter of Lena Horne. Lumet, a junior high school drama teacher, had written four earlier screenplays, but this was the first to be produced. The film was directed by Jonathan Demme. Sidney Lumet approached Demme about Jenny Lumet's script. Demme has commented that he loved Jenny's flagrant disregard for the rules of formula, her lack of concern for making her characters likable in the conventional sense, and for what he considered to be her bold approach to truth, pain, and humor.

Filming took 33 days and occurred in late 2007 in Stamford, Connecticut. It was shot in a naturalistic style. The working title for the film was originally Dancing with Shiva.

=== Casting ===
Demme had wanted to work with Anne Hathaway ever since he spotted her in a crowd at a screening five years earlier. He immediately took her in consideration for the lead role. Hathaway later said of her first reading Lumet's script: "I was in my old apartment in the West Village Manhattan, just pacing back and forth between the kitchen table and the couch. I somehow wound up on the floor sobbing by the last page."

Rosemarie DeWitt was considered by the film's casting directors. Demme and the rest of the crew were impressed and immediately wanted her to play Rachel. Bill Irwin is a personal friend of Demme's.

Tunde Adebimpe's role, Sidney, was originally offered to American film director Paul Thomas Anderson while he was working on the post-production of the movie There Will Be Blood.

Demme was concerned about Debra Winger's interest in doing the film, but he pumped up his courage to ask her because they had met several times before at the Jacob Burns Center, a film center close to their homes. Winger later accepted the role of Abby.

=== Music ===
The music-loving director Demme invited musicians to compose the score live on set, to support the film's storyline.

"For the longest time," Demme has said, "I've had this desire to provide the musical dimension of a movie without traditionally scored music. I thought: wait a minute; in the script, Paul [father of the bride] is a music-industry bigwig, Sidney's a record producer, many of his friends will be gifted musicians, so of course there would be non-stop music at this gathering. We have music playing live throughout the weekend, but always in the next room, out on the porch or in the garden."

Throughout the unconventional filming and loosely staged scenes, a New York–based Middle Eastern ensemble, including Palestinian musician Zafer Tawil, and Iraqi Amir ElSaffar, who played the score of Demme's documentary Man from Plains, compose the score on set. Always present at the filming, the musicians had the freedom—and were encouraged—to play whenever they were inspired to, and to ignore the camera.

According to Demme on the DVD, during filming of a dramatic scene, Hathaway complained about the music interfering with the mood, to which Demme responded, "Tell her to do something about it!" Hathaway, in that scene, responded by improvising the line, "Can you tell them to knock it off?!" to which another actor not heavily involved in the scene went off-screen and told the band to stop.

Well-known actors mingle anonymously on-screen with musicians, artists, and dancers. Among them are the New Orleanian saxophonist Donald Harrison Jr., and the Brooklyn-based TV on the Radio's lead singer Tunde Adebimpe.

Singer-songwriter Robyn Hitchcock plays a wedding guest. At the ceremony Hitchcock, at the request of his old friend Demme, performs the song "America" from his 1982 album Groovy Decay. He also plays "Up To Our Nex." written for the movie. "It's my micro-encapsulation of the movie. The song is trying to be a voice in Kym's head." Filmed in one take at the wedding party, he is spontaneously joined by the hip-hop star Fab 5 Freddy, and the dancehall singers Sister Carol, ElSaffar and Tawil.

Hitchcock recalled,

My memory of the whole thing is of being at a real wedding, although without the alcohol. A lot was shot in real time and the end result was the whole thing seemed as if it really had happened. It's as real as it gets. By the time I did 'Up To Our Nex' in the tent I had 15 people. Amir did a horn arrangement and Demme's son Brooklyn Demme was on electric guitar. We hadn't all played together before. The line between reality and fiction – it was a door you could walk in and out of as much as you liked. The idea that they are just playing live, that's the beauty of it. The thing I really liked about the music in the movie is that it all happens in real time. The moments of real tension in the film are not signposted by the score. It's not telling you how you're going to react when the music comes. The music is very organic, not manipulative.

For Demme, it was about creating evocative music in the moment.

=== Sound ===
Sound recording was a notable challenge in making Rachel Getting Married. Demme's documentary-inspired vision for the film — which consisted of long takes, multiple moving cameras, improvisation (in the acting as well as in the cinematography), and the live recording of music on set simultaneously with the dialog — made it difficult to record a wide range of sounds and to place and hide the necessary microphones. Sound mixer Jeff Pullman described his chosen approach as "miking this like an orchestra", with multitrack recording using up to 12 tracks.

== Reception ==
=== Critical response ===
The film received critical acclaim and appeared on many "Best Film of 2008" lists. On the review aggregator website Rotten Tomatoes, 85% of 201 critics' reviews are positive. The website's consensus reads: "Rachel Getting Married is an engrossing tale of family angst, highlighted by Anne Hathaway's powerful performance and director Jonathan Demme's return to form." Metacritic, which uses a weighted average, assigned the film a score of 85 out of 100, based on 36 critics, indicating "universal acclaim".

Michael Phillips of the Chicago Tribune called the film "a triumph of ambience", and applauded the acting, declaring that "Hathaway, DeWitt, Irwin and especially Winger are working at a very high level" in the film. Roger Ebert's four-star rating added, "apart from the story, which is interesting enough, 'Rachel Getting Married' is like the theme music for an evolving new age." Other critics praised Jonathan Demme. Andrew Sarris noted in the New York Observer "his career of cinematic good works" and Owen Gleiberman of Entertainment Weekly observed "a fight scene that's as raw as Ingmar Bergman and as operatic as Mildred Pierce"... and "Demme's finest work since The Silence of the Lambs.

Peter Travers of Rolling Stone noted that Rachel Getting Married is "a home run ... [it goes] deep into the joy and pain of being human." A.O. Scott of The New York Times said that the film "has an undeniable and authentic vitality, an exuberance of spirit, that feels welcome and rare".

Many reviewers praised the film for its organic feel; Salon reviewer Stephanie Zacharek noted that "with 'Rachel Getting Married,' Demme has once again scaled back, making a picture that has some of the ease and warmth of his earlier movies, although it also feels stripped down and direct in a way that's new for Demme." USA Today proclaimed: "After a foray in documentary films, director Jonathan Demme has returned to narrative storytelling, assuming a decidedly cinéma vérité style that has echoes of Robert Altman. The film's greatest asset is the sense of cringing realism in portraying dinner parties and interpersonal encounters that can throw family members off-kilter." The Los Angeles Times noted:

Helping give this story its essential air of reality is the decision Demme and cinematographer Quinn made to shoot it as what they call "the most beautiful home movie ever made." The director chose not to plan shots in advance, instead giving Quinn (whose credits include Mira Nair's "Monsoon Wedding") the ability to respond in the moment to what was going on with the actors, and it's a tribute to his ability (and that of editor Tim Squyres) that his camera always seems to be in the right place at the right time.

Anne Hathaway won raves for her work as Kym. USA Today found her wonderful in the role and wrote "Her nervous laughter, edginess and quick temper blend convincingly with her need for attention and vulnerability." Newsweek commented: "Kym is a major pain in the ass, and Hathaway's raw, spiky performance makes no attempt to ingratiate. Yet she makes Kym's inner torment so palpable you can't help but feel for her, however insufferable she may be. It's a terrific performance ...". Empire felt that "Kym is a peach of a role—she sleeps with the best man, fights with the maid of honor, quips, 'You're so thin, it's like you're Asian'—and Hathaway squeezes it for all the juice it's worth, making this raw-nerved, narcissistic Tasmanian Devil not just believable, but somehow likable."

Beyond general analysis, film scholars have also approached the film as a critical commentary on East Coast liberalism in Contemporary Cinema and Neoliberal Ideology.

=== Top ten lists ===
The film appeared on many critics' top ten lists of the best films of 2008.

- 1st: David Edelstein, New York
- 1st: Ed Gonzalez, Slant Magazine
- 1st: Keith Phipps, The A.V. Club
- 1st: Nathan Rabin, The A.V. Club
- 1st: Scott Tobias, The A.V. Club
- 2nd: David Denby, The New Yorker
- 2nd: Nell Minow, The Movie Mom
- 3rd: Owen Gleiberman, Entertainment Weekly
- 3rd: Rick Groen, The Globe and Mail
- 4th: Elizabeth Weitzman, Daily News
- 4th: Shawn Levy, The Oregonian
- 5th: Kimberly Jones, The Austin Chronicle
- 6th: Kenneth Turan, Los Angeles Times
- 6th: Robert Mondello, NPR
- 7th: Carrie Rickey, The Philadelphia Inquirer
- 7th: Michael Sragow, The Baltimore Sun
- 7th: Noel Murray, The A.V. Club
- 7th: Ty Burr, The Boston Globe
- 8th: Ann Hornaday, The Washington Post
- 8th: Rene Rodriguez, Miami Herald
- 9th: A. O. Scott, The New York Times
- 9th: Peter Travers, Rolling Stone
- Top 20: Roger Ebert, Chicago Sun-Times (Ebert gave an alphabetically listed top 20)

=== Accolades ===
Ceremony	Category	Recipients	Result
13th Satellite Awards	Best Actress – Drama	Anne Hathaway	Nominated
13th Satellite Awards	Best Supporting Actress	Rosemarie DeWitt	Won
14th Critics' Choice Awards	Best Actress	Anne Hathaway	Won
14th Critics' Choice Awards	Best Cast		Nominated
15th Screen Actors Guild Awards	Best Female Actor in a Leading Role	Anne Hathaway	Nominated
24th Independent Spirit Awards	Best Film		Nominated
24th Independent Spirit Awards	Best Director	Jonathan Demme	Nominated
24th Independent Spirit Awards	Best Female Lead	Anne Hathaway	Nominated
24th Independent Spirit Awards	Best First Screenplay	Jenny Lumet	Nominated
24th Independent Spirit Awards	Best Supporting Female	Rosemarie DeWitt	Nominated
24th Independent Spirit Awards	Best Supporting Female	Debra Winger	Nominated
66th Golden Globe Awards	Best Actress – Drama	Anne Hathaway	Nominated
81st Academy Awards	Best Actress	Anne Hathaway	Nominated
2008 New York Film Critics Circle Awards	Best Film		Nominated
2008 New York Film Critics Circle Awards	Best Actress	Anne Hathaway	Nominated
2008 New York Film Critics Circle Awards	Best Supporting Actress	Rosemarie DeWitt	Nominated
2008 New York Film Critics Circle Awards	Best Supporting Actress	Debra Winger	Nominated
2008 New York Film Critics Circle Awards	Best Screenplay	Jenny Lumet	Won
Austin Film Critics Association Awards 2008	Best Actress	Anne Hathaway	Won
Central Ohio Film Critics Association Awards 2008	Best Actress	Anne Hathaway	Nominated
Chicago Film Critics Association Awards 2008	Best Actress	Anne Hathaway	Won
Chicago Film Critics Association Awards 2008	Best Supporting Actor	Bill Irwin	Nominated
Chicago Film Critics Association Awards 2008	Best Supporting Actress	Rosemarie DeWitt	Nominated
Chicago Film Critics Association Awards 2008	Best Original Screenplay	Jenny Lumet	Nominated
Dallas–Fort Worth Film Critics Association Awards 2008	Best Actress	Anne Hathaway	Won
Dallas–Fort Worth Film Critics Association Awards 2008	Best Supporting Actress	Rosemarie DeWitt	Nominated
Detroit Film Critics Society Awards 2008	Best Actress	Anne Hathaway	Nominated
Detroit Film Critics Society Awards 2008	Best Supporting Actress	Rosemarie DeWitt	Nominated
Detroit Film Critics Society Awards 2008	Best Newcomer	Rosemarie DeWitt	Nominated
Detroit Film Critics Society Awards 2008	Best Ensemble		Nominated
Gotham Independent Film Awards 2008	Breakthrough Performer	Rosemarie DeWitt	Nominated
Gotham Independent Film Awards 2008	Best Ensemble Cast		Nominated
Houston Film Critics Society Awards 2008	Best Actress in a Leading Role	Anne Hathaway	Won
Houston Film Critics Society Awards 2008	Best Cast		Nominated
International Cinephile Society Awards 2009	Best Picture		Nominated
International Cinephile Society Awards 2009	Best Actress	Anne Hathaway	Nominated
International Cinephile Society Awards 2009	Best Supporting Actress	Rosemarie DeWitt	Nominated
International Cinephile Society Awards 2009	Best Ensemble		Nominated
London Film Critics' Circle Awards 2008	Actress of the Year	Anne Hathaway	Nominated
National Board of Review Awards 2008	Best Actress	Anne Hathaway	Won
Online Film Critics Society Awards 2008	Best Actress	Anne Hathaway	Nominated
Palm Springs International Film Festival	Best Actress	Anne Hathaway	Won
Santa Barbara International Film Festival	Virtuoso Award	Rosemarie DeWitt	Won
Southeastern Film Critics Association Awards 2008	Best Actress	Anne Hathaway	Won
St. Louis Gateway Film Critics Association Awards 2008	Best Actress	Anne Hathaway	Nominated
Toronto Film Critics Association Awards 2008	Best Film		Nominated
Toronto Film Critics Association Awards 2008	Best Director	Jonathan Demme	Won
Toronto Film Critics Association Awards 2008	Best Actress	Anne Hathaway	Nominated
Toronto Film Critics Association Awards 2008	Best Supporting Actress	Rosemarie DeWitt	Won
Toronto Film Critics Association Awards 2008	Best Screenplay	Jenny Lumet	Won
Utah Film Critics Association Awards 2008	Best Picture		Nominated
Utah Film Critics Association Awards 2008	Best Actress	Anne Hathaway	Nominated
Utah Film Critics Association Awards 2008	Best Supporting Actress	Rosemarie DeWitt	Won
Utah Film Critics Association Awards 2008	Best Screenplay	Jenny Lumet	Won
Vancouver Film Critics Circle Awards 2008	Best Supporting Actress	Rosemarie DeWitt	Won
Venice Film Festival	Golden Lion		Nominated
Washington D.C. Area Film Critics Association Awards 2008	Best Supporting Actress	Rosemarie DeWitt	Won
Washington D.C. Area Film Critics Association Awards 2008	Best Screenplay – Original	Jenny Lumet	Won
