= Crimes of the Heart =

Pulitzer Prize winning play

- Original Broadway poster
- Written by: Beth Henley
- Characters: Babe Botrelle; Meg Magrath; Lenny Magrath; Barnette Lloyd; Doc Porter; Chick Boyle
- Date premiered: 1979
- Place premiered: Actors Theatre of Louisville
- Original language: English
- Genre: Black comedy
- Setting: Hazelhurst, Mississippi

Crimes of the Heart is a play by American playwright Beth Henley. It is set in Hazlehurst, Mississippi in the mid-20th century. The play won the 1981 Pulitzer Prize for Drama and was nominated for the Tony Award for Best Play. In 1986, the play was novelized and released as a book, written by Claudia Reilly.

== Synopsis ==
The tragicomedy relates the story of the three Magrath sisters, Meg, Babe, and Lenny, who reunite at Old Granddaddy's home in Hazlehurst, Mississippi, after Babe shoots her abusive husband. The sisters were raised in a dysfunctional family with a penchant for ugly predicaments. Each has endured her share of hardship and misery. Past resentments bubble to the surface as the sisters are forced to deal with assorted relatives and past relationships while coping with Babe's latest incident. Each sister is forced to face the consequences of the "crimes of the heart" she has committed.

== Summary ==
In Act One, Lenny and Chick walk into the scene talking about the news that is in the paper. They start talking about what is happening with the sisters. Chick mentions that Doc is crippled with a limp due to Meg's actions and does not want her to come home. Chick then gives Lenny a birthday present; a box of chocolates. Doc enters with a bag of pecans for Lenny, and Chick leaves. Doc gave her the pecans because it is her birthday and her horse has died. Doc leaves shortly after to go pick up his son from the dentist. Meg then arrives home and hears the news about what Babe has done; she has shot her husband. Meg tells Lenny about her failed singing career. They then talk about Doc and his family. Babe then arrives and excited to see her sister, but promptly leaves after being scolded by Chick. The scene continues with more exposition about the case and what is happening with the sisters.

In Act Two, Babe's lawyer is going over her case with her as she tells him what happened. They receive a phone call telling Barnette that there is new evidence he needs to pick up at the hospital. He leaves to go pick up the evidence. Lenny arrives home and tells Babe that she is frustrated with Meg because she lied to their grandfather about her success. Meg arrives home with alcohol and a newspaper for Babe. Meg apologizes for lying to her grandfather and it starts an argument. This leads Meg to make Lenny cry, and Babe follows her to comfort her. Doc arrives and shares a drink with Meg. Meg and Doc reconnect about the hurricane and why they separated due to Meg leaving town. Meg explains that she went to the psych ward and her life had gone downhill. After a pause, Doc offers to go for a ride and look at the Moon, and they leave. Babe comes to look for her sister but finds her lawyer, Barnette with photos of her and her lover, Willie Jay. She starts to panic, but Lenny comes downstairs to tell them that Old Granddaddy had another stroke.

In Act Three, Chick asks how Old Granddaddy is. Lenny tells her that he will more than likely die soon. Chick goes home to make some phone calls. Lenny tells Babe that she wished that Old Granddaddy would pass and that they didn't all fight so much. Meg comes home happy and tells her sisters that she realized she had empathy for others. The sisters told Meg that their grandfather will more than likely die soon, and they start laughing. Lenny tells them that she doesn't want to be alone, and Meg tells her that she should call an old lover. Lenny goes upstairs, and Babe shows Meg the photos. Barnette shows up to collect the photos and tells Babe that he had a plan for her case. Meg leaves with Barnette to go buy Lenny a birthday cake. Lenny comes back downstairs and Chick arrives to tell the sisters that it is awful Meg is their sister. Lenny stands up for Meg, chasing Chick out of the house. She then calls her old lover and they make a date. She goes outside to find Meg, and while she is gone Babe tries to kill herself. Meg comes home to find Babe, and Babe reveals she knows why their mother killed the cat when she killed herself. When Lenny arrives back, they sing Happy Birthday to her and she wishes that they were happy and smiling. Once they cut the cake, they are all laughing and smiling, finally happy.

== Production history ==
Henley completed her play in 1978 and submitted it to several regional theatres without success. Unknown to her, a friend entered it in the Great American Play Contest at the Actors Theatre of Louisville. The play was first performed in February 1979 at the Actors Theatre Louisville and it was named co-winner of the contest. The play continued to be developed, with productions in Los Gatos, California, St. Louis, and Baltimore at the Centre Stage Theatre.

The Manhattan Theatre Club produced the play Off-Broadway at Stage 73, from December 9, 1980, to January 11, 1981, for 35 sold-out performances. Directed by Melvin Bernhardt, the set design was by John Lee Beatty, costumes by Patricia McGourty, and lighting by Dennis Parichy. The cast featured Mia Dillon (Babe McGrath), Mary Beth Hurt (Meg McGrath), Lizbeth MacKay (Lenny McGrath), Julie Nesbit (Chick Boyle), Stephen Burleigh (Doc Porter), and Peter MacNicol (Barnette Lloyd).

The play opened on Broadway at the John Golden Theatre on November 4, 1981, and closed on February 13, 1983, after 535 performances and 13 previews with cast replacements Raymond Baker (Doc Porter) and Sharon Ullrick (Chick Boyle). Holly Hunter made her Broadway debut later in the run as a replacement in the role of Meg. J. Smith-Cameron also made her debut later in the run as Babe. The Broadway cast also performed in a production at the Ahmanson Theatre in 1983.

The first London production was in 1983 at the Bush Theatre. The first Chicago production was at the Blackstone Theatre in 1983.

An Off-Broadway revival at Second Stage Theatre ran from April 16, 2001 to May 13, 2001. It was directed by Garry Hynes, and featured Julia Murney (Chick), Enid Graham (Lenny), Mary Catherine Garrison (Babe), and Amy Ryan (Meg). The play was nominated for the Lucille Lortel Award for Best Revival.

The play was presented at the Williamstown Theatre Festival in August 2007, directed by Kathleen Turner and featuring Jennifer Dundas, Sarah Paulson, Lily Rabe, and Kali Rocha. This production was moved to the Roundabout Theatre Company for an Off-Broadway run. It ran February 14 to April 20, 2008 with Jessica Stone replacing Rocha as Chick.

== Historical casting ==
Character	1979 Louisville cast	1980 Manhattan Theatre Club cast	1981 Broadway cast	1983 London cast	1986 Film cast
Rebecca MaGrath/Babe Botrelle	Lee Anne Fahey	Mia Dillon	Mia Dillon	Wendy Morgan	Sissy Spacek
Lenny MaGrath	Kathy Bates	Lizbeth MacKay	Lizbeth MacKay	Brenda Blethyn	Diane Keaton
Meg MaGrath	Susan Kingsley	Mary Beth Hurt	Mary Beth Hurt	Amanda Redman	Jessica Lange
Chick Boyle	Nicola Sheara	Julie Nesbit	Sharon Ullrick	Janine Duvitski	Tess Harper

== Film adaptation ==
The 1986 film adaptation was directed by Bruce Beresford; and starred Sissy Spacek as Babe, Jessica Lange as Meg, Diane Keaton as Lenny, Tess Harper as Chick, Sam Shepard as Doc, and Hurd Hatfield as Old Granddaddy. It garnered three Academy Award nominations: Best Adapted Screenplay (Beth Henley), Best Actress (Spacek), and Best Supporting Actress (Harper).

== Critical response ==
Charles Isherwood, in his review of the 2008 revival for The New York Times called the production "a touching revival", and wrote: "Was another romp through Ms. Henley’s playfully Gothic imagination entirely necessary? Perhaps not. Might regular theatergoers eventually tire of these adorable eccentrics, laughing through their tears and crying themselves back to laughter again? Possibly... Interesting roles for women, on screen or behind it, are hard to come by. The quick return of 'Crimes of the Heart,'... gives another handful of talented women a chance to exercise—and, in the case of Ms. Turner, deepen—their gifts onstage."

== Awards and nominations ==
Awards

- 1981 New York Drama Critics' Circle Award for Best American Play
- 1981 Pulitzer Prize for Drama
- 1982 Theatre World Award

Lizbeth MacKay
Peter MacNicol

Nominations

- 1982 Tony Award for Best Play
- 1982 Tony Award, Best Featured Actress in a Play

Mia Dillon
Mary Beth Hurt

- 1982 Tony Award, Best Direction of a Play (Melvin Bernhardt)
- 1981 Drama Desk Award for Outstanding New Play
- 1981 Drama Desk Award Outstanding Actress in a Play (Mary Beth Hurt)
- 1981 Drama Desk Award Outstanding Director of a Play
- 2002 Lucille Lortel Award, Outstanding Revival
