= Holly Hunter =

American actress (born 1958)

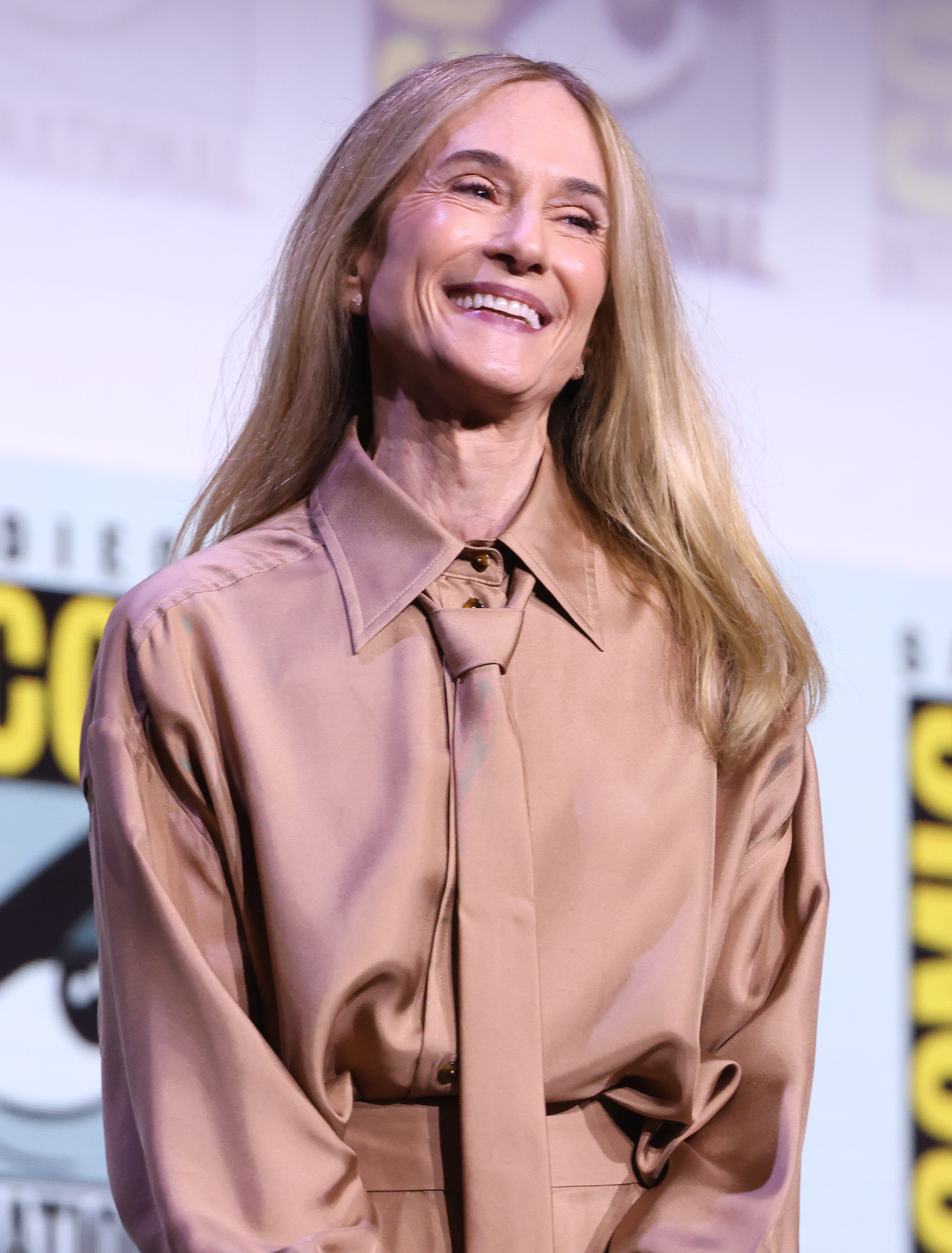
- Hunter in 2025
- Born: March 20, 1958 (age 68); Conyers, Georgia, U.S.
- Education: Carnegie Mellon University (BFA)
- Occupation: Actress
- Years active: 1981–present
- Spouse: Janusz Kamiński (m. 1995; div. 2001)
- Partner: Gordon MacDonald (2001–present)
- Children: 2
- Awards: Full list

Holly Hunter (born March 20, 1958) is an American actress. Born in Conyers, Georgia, her first acting role was as Helen Keller in a fifth-grade play, before appearing in Rockdale County High School stagings of Oklahoma!, Man of La Mancha, and Fiddler on the Roof. In Pittsburgh, she graduated with a drama degree at Carnegie Mellon University and performed in local theater.

Hunter then moved to New York City with Frances McDormand, beginning a Broadway career. After appearing in a slasher film released in 1981, The Burning, she moved to Los Angeles a year later, taking on various supporting roles in theatrical and television films, before starring in Raising Arizona (1987) and receiving the Berlin Film Festival's Silver Bear and her first nomination at the Academy Awards for her starring role in Broadcast News (1987). She later went on to win two Primetime Emmy Awards for Outstanding Lead Actress for her performances in the television films Roe vs. Wade (1989) and The Positively True Adventures of the Alleged Texas Cheerleader-Murdering Mom (1993).

Hunter won the Academy Award for Best Actress for her performance as a mute Scottish woman in The Piano (1993). That same year, she was also nominated for the Academy Award for Best Supporting Actress for the legal thriller The Firm (1993). She earned another Oscar nomination in the same category a decade later for the coming-of-age drama Thirteen (2003). Other major accolades she has won include an AACTA Award, a BAFTA Award, a Cannes Film Festival Award, and a Golden Globe.

== Early life ==
Hunter was born in Conyers, Georgia to Marguerite "Dee Dee" (née Catledge), a homemaker, and Charles Edwin Hunter, a part-time sporting goods company representative and farmer with a 250-acre farm. She is the youngest of six children. Her parents encouraged her talent at an early age, and her first acting part was as Helen Keller in a fifth-grade play. She is unable to hear with her left ear due to a childhood case of the mumps. The condition sometimes leads to complications at work, and some movie scenes have to be altered from the script for her to use her right ear. She is irreligious. She began acting at Rockdale County High School in the early 1970s, performing in local productions of Oklahoma!, Man of La Mancha, and Fiddler on the Roof. Hunter earned a degree in drama from Carnegie Mellon University in Pittsburgh and for a while performed in local theater, playing ingenue roles at City Theater, then named the City Players.

== Career ==
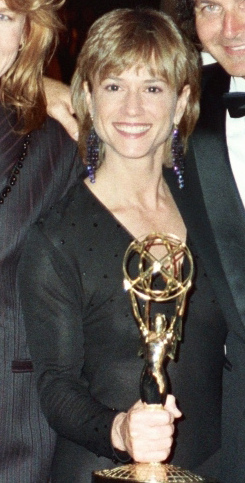
Hunter at the 1989 Emmy Awards

Hunter moved to New York City and roomed with fellow actress Frances McDormand, living in the Bronx "at the end of the D (subway) train, just off 205th Street, on Bainbridge Avenue and Hull Avenue". A chance encounter with playwright Beth Henley, when the two were trapped alone in an elevator, led to Hunter's being cast in Henley's plays Crimes of the Heart (succeeding Mary Beth Hurt on Broadway), and Off-Broadway's The Miss Firecracker Contest. "It was like the beginning of 1982. It was on 49th Street between Broadway and Eighth [Avenue] ... on the south side of the street," Hunter recalled in an interview. "[We were trapped] 10 minutes; not long. We actually had a nice conversation. It was just the two of us."

Hunter made her film debut in the 1981 slasher movie The Burning. After moving to Los Angeles in 1982, Hunter appeared in TV movies before being cast in a supporting role in 1984's Swing Shift. That year, she had her first collaboration with the writing-directing-producing team of brothers Ethan Coen and Joel Coen, in Blood Simple, making an uncredited appearance as a voice on an answering-machine recording. More film and television work followed until 1987, when she earned a starring role in the Coens' Raising Arizona and was nominated for an Academy Award for her performance in Broadcast News, after which Hunter became a critically acclaimed star.

Hunter went on to the screen adaptation of Henley's Miss Firecracker; Steven Spielberg's Always, a romantic drama with Richard Dreyfuss; and the made-for-TV 1989 docudrama Roe vs. Wade about the Supreme Court case Roe v. Wade. Following her second collaboration with Dreyfuss, in Once Around, Hunter garnered critical attention for her work in two 1993 films, resulting in her being nominated for two Academy Awards the same year: Hunter's performance in The Firm won her a nomination as Best Supporting Actress, while her portrayal of a mute Scottish woman entangled in an adulterous affair with Harvey Keitel in Jane Campion's The Piano won her the Best Actress award. Hunter went on to star in the comedy-drama Home for the Holidays and the thriller Copycat, both in 1995. Hunter appeared in David Cronenberg's Crash and as a sardonic angel in A Life Less Ordinary. The following year, Hunter played a recently divorced New Yorker in Richard LaGravenese's Living Out Loud; starring alongside Danny DeVito, Queen Latifah, and Martin Donovan. Hunter rounded out the 1990s with a minor role in the independent drama Jesus' Son and as a housekeeper torn between a grieving widower and his son in Kiefer Sutherland's drama Woman Wanted. Following a supporting role in the Coens' O Brother, Where Art Thou?, Hunter took top billing in the same year's television movie Harlan County War, an account of labor struggles among Kentucky coal-mine workers. Hunter would continue her small screen streak with a role in When Billie Beat Bobby, playing tennis pro Billie Jean King in the fact-based story of King's exhibition match with Bobby Riggs; and as narrator of Eco Challenge New Zealand before returning to film work with a minor role in the 2002 drama Moonlight Mile. The following year found Hunter in the redemption drama Levity.

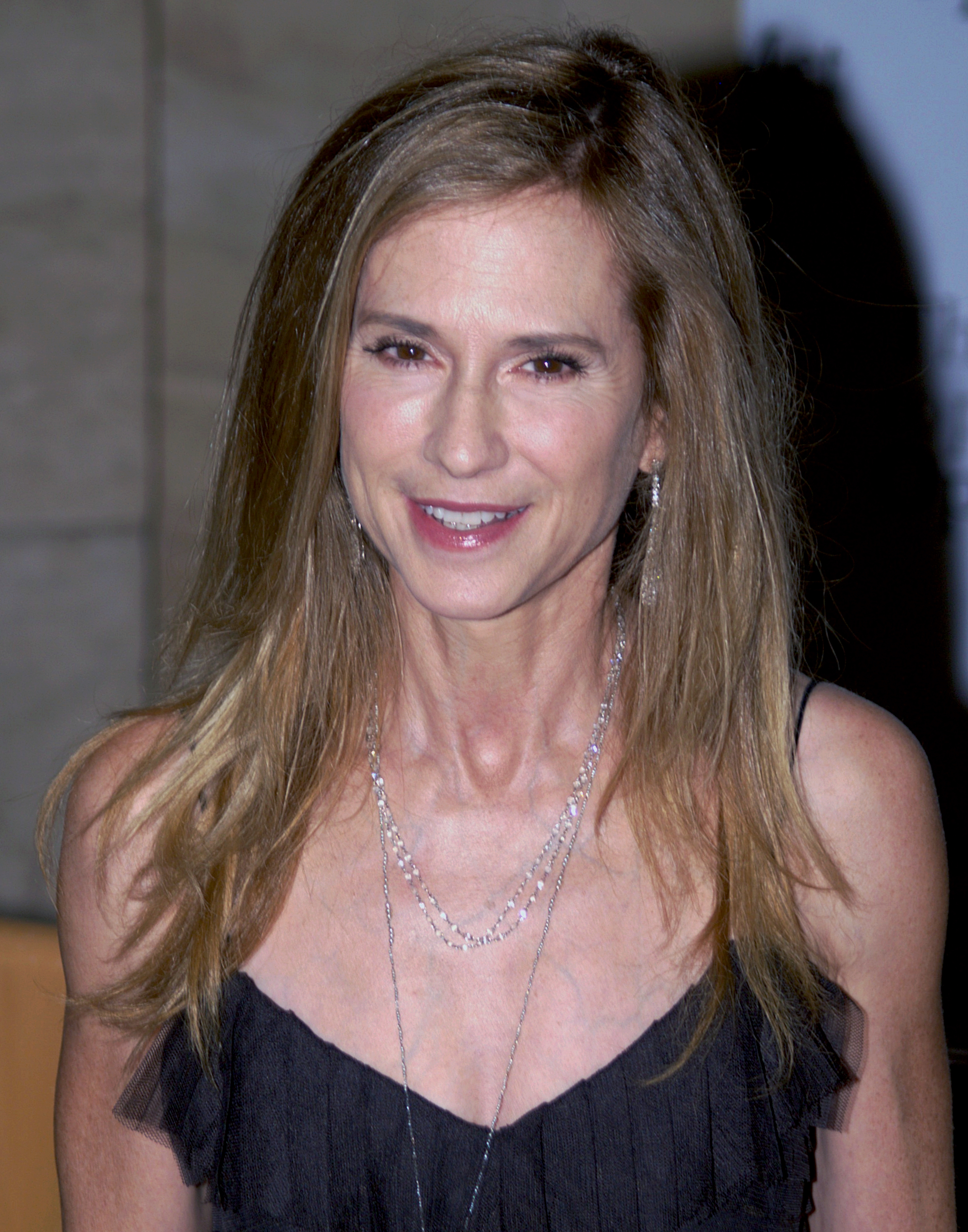
Hunter at the 2010 Metropolitan Opera opening night of Das Rheingold

In 2003, Hunter had the role of a mother named Melanie Freeland, whose daughter is troubled and going through the perils of being a teenager in the film Thirteen. The film was critically acclaimed along with Hunter and her co-stars and earned her nominations for the Academy Award and Golden Globe Award for Best Supporting Actress. In 2004, Hunter starred alongside Brittany Murphy in the romantic satire Little Black Book, and provided the voice for Helen Parr (also known as Elastigirl) in the animated superhero film, The Incredibles. She reprised the role in the Disney Infinity video game series, and in the film's long-awaited sequel Incredibles 2 in 2018. She will reprise the role again in the third installment. She also voiced Chicken Little during the early production of the 2005 film Chicken Little until the character's gender was changed and was replaced by Zach Braff.

In 2005, Hunter starred alongside Robin Williams in the black comedy-drama The Big White. Hunter became an executive producer, and helped develop a starring vehicle for herself with the TNT cable-network drama Saving Grace, which premiered in July 2007. For her acting, she received a Golden Globe Award nomination, two Screen Actors Guild Award nominations, and an Emmy Award nomination. On May 30, 2008, Hunter received a star on the Hollywood Walk of Fame. In 2009, she was awarded the Women in Film Lucy Award. In 2016, Hunter played Senator Finch in Batman v Superman: Dawn of Justice. Hunter's likeness was used to portray Senator Finch in the Batman v Superman: Dawn of Justice tie-in prequel comics released by Dr. Pepper on February 3, 2016. In 2019, she took on a recurring role in the HBO series Succession as CEO Rhea Jarrell, leader of a rival media conglomerate. Hunter subsequently starred opposite Ted Danson in the 2021 NBC comedy Mr. Mayor.

In 2023, Hunter was cast in Hurricanna alongside Sylvia Hoeks. It is a dramatization of the final days of Playboy model and reality TV actress Anna Nicole Smith. Hunter portrays Smith's therapist. Production took place in late 2023.

In 2025, she played Madeline Vance in the science fiction film The Electric State. In 2026, she portrayed Captain Nahla Ake, the lead role in Star Trek: Starfleet Academy.

== Personal life ==
Hunter was married to Janusz Kamiński, cinematographer of Schindler's List and Saving Private Ryan from 1995 until 2001.

She has been in a relationship with British actor Gordon MacDonald since 2001. The couple met in San Jose Repertory Theatre's production of playwright Marina Carr's By the Bog of Cats, in which she played a woman abandoned by her lover of 14 years, played by MacDonald. In January 2006, Hunter gave birth to the couple's twin sons.

== Filmography ==
=== Film ===
Year	Title	Role	Notes
1981	The Burning	Sophie	
1984	Swing Shift	Jeannie	
1984	Blood Simple	Helene Trend	Voice, uncredited
1987	Raising Arizona	Edwina "Ed" McDunnough	
1987	End of the Line	Charlotte Haney	
1987	Broadcast News	Jane Craig	
1989	Miss Firecracker	Carnelle Scott	
1989	Animal Behavior	Coral Grable	
1989	Always	Dorinda Durston	
1991	Once Around	Renata Bella	
1993	The Piano	Ada McGrath	
1993	The Firm	Tammy Hemphill	
1995	Copycat	Inspector Mary Jane "M.J." Monahan	
1995	Home for the Holidays	Claudia Larson	
1996	Crash	Helen Remington	
1997	A Life Less Ordinary	O'Reilly	
1998	Living Out Loud	Judith Moore	
1999	Jesus' Son	Mira	
1999	Woman Wanted	Emma Riley	
2000	Timecode	Renee Fishbine	
2000	O Brother, Where Art Thou?	Penny Wharvey McGill	
2001	Festival in Cannes	Herself	
2002	Searching for Debra Winger	Herself	Documentary
2002	Moonlight Mile	Mona Camp	
2003	Levity	Adele Easley	
2003	Thirteen	Melanie Freeland	Also executive producer
2004	Little Black Book	Barb Campbell-Dunn	
2004	The Incredibles	Helen Parr / Elastigirl	Voice role
2005	Nine Lives	Sonia	
2005	The Big White	Margaret Barnell	
2005	Chicken Little	Chicken Little	Voice role; deleted scenes
2011	Portraits in Dramatic Time	Herself	Documentary
2012	Won't Back Down	Evelyn Riske	
2012	Jackie	Jackie	
2013	Paradise	Mrs. Mannerhelm	
2014	Manglehorn	Dawn	
2016	Batman v Superman: Dawn of Justice	Senator Finch	
2016	Strange Weather	Darcy Baylor	
2017	Breakable You	Eleanor Weller	
2017	The Big Sick	Beth Gardner	
2017	Song to Song	Miranda	
2018	Incredibles 2	Helen Parr / Elastigirl	Voice role
2025	The Electric State	Madeline Vance	
2025	Hurricanna	Anna's therapist	
2028	Incredibles 3	Helen Parr / Elastigirl	Voice role; In production

=== Television ===
Year	Title	Role	Notes
1983	Svengali	Leslie	Television film
1983	An Uncommon Love	Karen	Television film
1984	With Intent to Kill	Wynn Nolen	Television film
1987	A Gathering of Old Men	Candy Marshall	Television film
1989	Roe vs. Wade	Ellen Russell/Jane Doe	Television film
1989	The Three Billy Goats Gruff and The Three Little Pigs	Narrator (voice)	Television short
1992	Crazy in Love	Georgie Symonds	Television film
1993	The Positively True Adventures of the Alleged Texas Cheerleader-Murdering Mom	Wanda Holloway	Television film
2000	Harlan County War	Ruby Kincaid	Television film
2000	Things You Can Tell Just by Looking at Her	Rebecca Weyman	Segment: "Fantasies About Rebecca"
2001	When Billie Beat Bobby	Billie Jean King	Television film; also executive producer
2007	Peep and the Big Wide World	Robin (voice)	Episode: "Big Bird/Chirp Flies the Coop"
2007–2010	Saving Grace	Grace Hanadarko	46 episodes; also executive producer
2013	Top of the Lake	GJ	6 episodes
2013	Bonnie & Clyde	Emma Parker	2 episodes
2018	Here and Now	Audrey Bayer	10 episodes
2019	Succession	Rhea Jarrell	6 episodes
2019–2020	Bless the Harts	Marjune Gamble (voice)	3 episodes
2020	The Comey Rule	Sally Yates	2 episodes
2021–2022	Mr. Mayor	Arpi Meskimen	Main role
2024	Mulligan	Sheila (voice)	2 episodes
2025	Big Mouth	Coco the Compassion Pachyderm (voice)	Episode: "Have Some Goddamn Compassion"
2026–present	Star Trek: Starfleet Academy	Captain Nahla Ake	Main role

=== Video games ===
Year	Title	Role	Notes
2013	Disney Infinity	Helen Parr / Elastigirl	
2014	Disney Infinity: Marvel Super Heroes	Helen Parr / Elastigirl	
2015	Disney Infinity 3.0	Helen Parr / Elastigirl	
2024	Disney Speedstorm	Helen Parr / Elastigirl	

=== Theme parks ===
Year	Title	Role	Notes
2018	Incredicoaster	Helen Parr / Elastigirl	Voice

== Awards and nominations ==
In 1999, Hunter received the Golden Plate Award of the American Academy of Achievement. In 2016, Hunter was awarded an Honorary Doctorate degree by her alma mater, Carnegie Mellon University.
