= Beth Henley =

American dramatist (born 1952)

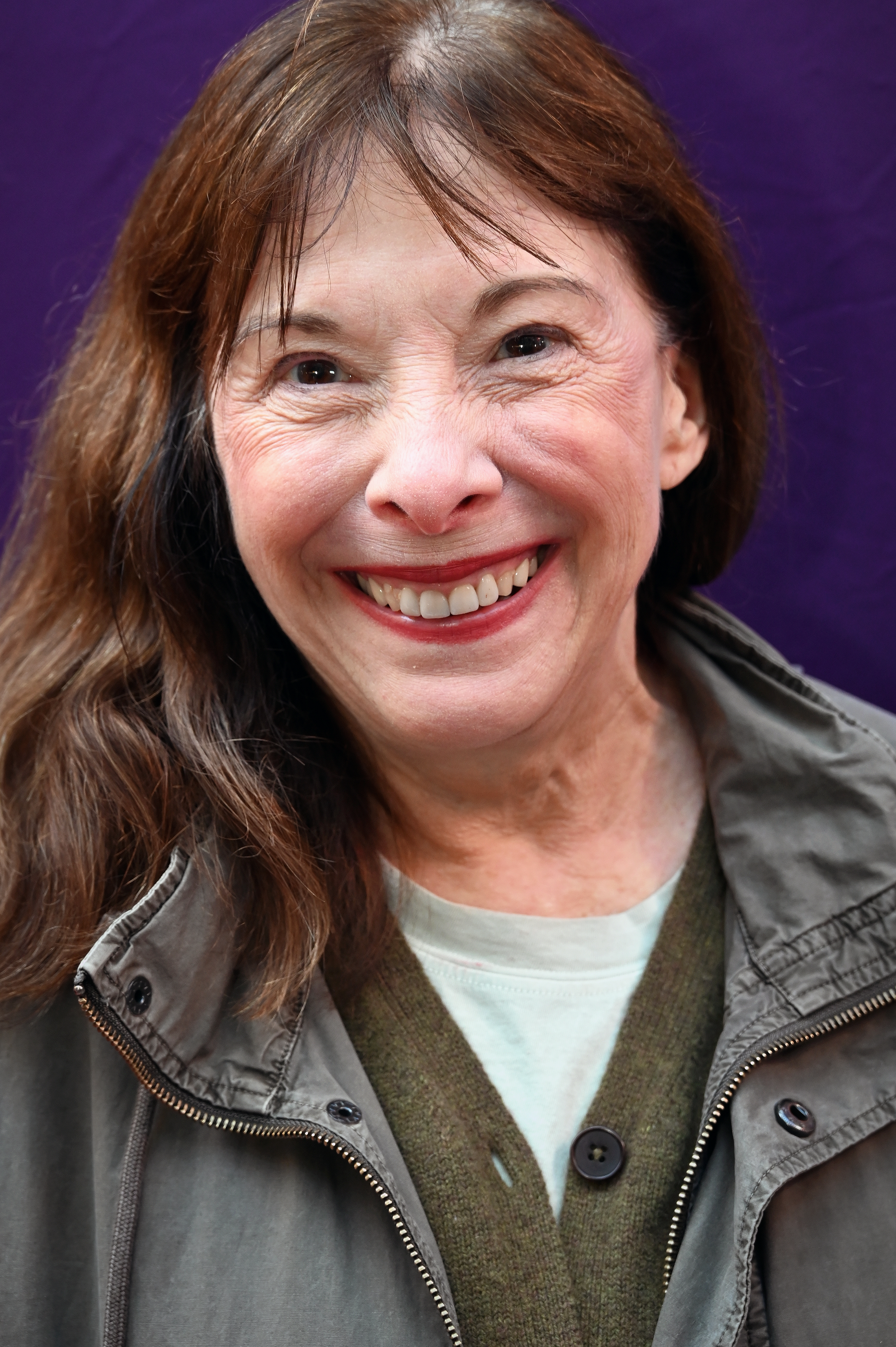
- Henley in 2026
- Born: Elizabeth Becker Henley; May 8, 1952 (age 74); Jackson, Mississippi
- Education: Southern Methodist University (BFA)
- Parent: Charles B. Henley (father)
- Writing career
- Notable awards: Pulitzer Prize for Drama (1981)

Elizabeth Becker Henley (born May 8, 1952) is an American playwright, screenwriter, and actress. Her play Crimes of the Heart won the 1981 Pulitzer Prize for Drama, the 1981 New York Drama Critics' Circle Award for Best American Play, and a nomination for a Tony Award. Her screenplay for Crimes of the Heart was nominated for an Academy Award for Best Adapted Screenplay.

== Biography ==
Henley was born in 1952 in Jackson, Mississippi. She was one of four sisters. Her parents were Charles B. Henley, an attorney, and Elizabeth Josephine Henley, an actress. Henley attended Murrah High School in Jackson, followed by Southern Methodist University, where she was a member of the acting ensemble. While at college, Henley completed her first play, a one-act piece entitled Am I Blue. She graduated from Southern Methodist in 1974 with a BFA. From 1975 to 1976, she taught playwriting at the University of Illinois (Urbana) and the Dallas Minority Repertory Theater.

In 1976, Henley moved to Los Angeles and began work on her play Crimes of the Heart.

For many years, Henley dated actor, writer and director Stephen Tobolowsky, whom she met while they were students at Southern Methodist University. Their relationship ended in 1988.

== Playwright and screenwriter ==
Crimes of the Heart was Henley's first professionally produced play. It opened at the Actors Theatre of Louisville in 1978, where it was declared co-winner of a new American play contest. The play then moved to New York and was produced by the Manhattan Theatre Club. Crimes of the Heart won the Pulitzer Prize for Drama in 1981 as well as the award for Best American Play of 1981 from the New York Drama Critics' Circle. The play also earned Henley a nomination for a Tony Award, and her screenplay for the film version of Crimes of the Heart was nominated for an Oscar as Best Adapted Screenplay. Henley has stated that growing up with three sisters was a major inspiration for her play Crimes of the Heart.

Henley's first six plays are set in the Deep South: two in Louisiana and four in Mississippi, where she grew up.

Henley adapted her 1984 play The Miss Firecracker Contest into a 1989 film starring Holly Hunter entitled Miss Firecracker. Henley's play Ridiculous Fraud was produced at the McCarter Theatre, Princeton, New Jersey in 2006. Her play Family Week was produced at MCC Theater, New York City in 2010, directed by Jonathan Demme.

== Criticism ==
The themes in her plays often consider the importance of love, the contrast between family love and romantic love, how family and society define and confine her female characters, and the alienation and suffering of the human condition. Characters in her plays may seek happiness but are betrayed by modern civilization. Henley's work suggests the influence of Freud's psychoanalytic theory. Her Southern sense of the grotesque and absurd experienced in daily existence have caused her to be compared to other Southern writers such as Eudora Welty and Flannery O'Connor, or to be considered part of the Southern Gothic tradition.

Her plays written in the 1980s have been characterized as naturalistic portrayals of the relationship between the inner self and the world, and her characters often are outsiders and nonconformists unable to share their feelings and experiences. Her plays of the 1990s, including Abundance, the first play not set in the South, are considered more experimental than her earlier work. Henley applies new techniques and styles in these plays. Her play Revelers employs some older and traditional theatre techniques.

== Bibliography ==
- Am I Blue (1972)
- Crimes of the Heart (1978)
- The Miss Firecracker Contest (1979)
- The Wake of Jamey Foster (1981)
- The Debutante Ball (1985)
- The Lucky Spot (1986)
- Abundance (1990)
- Control Freaks (1992)
- Signature (1995)
- L-play (1996)
- Revelers (1996)
- Impossible Marriage (1998)
- Family Week (2000)
- Sisters of the Winter Madrigal (2003)
- Ridiculous Fraud (2007)
- The Jacksonian (2013)

== Filmography ==
- Swing Shift (1984), actress
- True Stories (1986), co-screenwriter
- Nobody's Fool (1986), screenwriter
- Crimes of the Heart (1986), screenwriter
- Trying Times; "A Family Tree" (1987), screenwriter
- Miss Firecracker (1989), screenwriter
- It Must Be Love (2004), screenwriter

== Sources ==
- Andreach, Robert (2006). Understanding Beth Henley. Columbia, South Carolina: University of South Carolina. ISBN 1-57003-639-X.
- McTague, Sylvia Skaggs, ed. (2004). The Muse upon My Shoulder: Discussions of the Creative Process. Cranbury, New Jersey: Fairleigh Dickinson University Press. ISBN 0-8386-3996-8.
