= List of awards and nominations received by Sally Hawkins =

Sally Hawkins awards and nominations
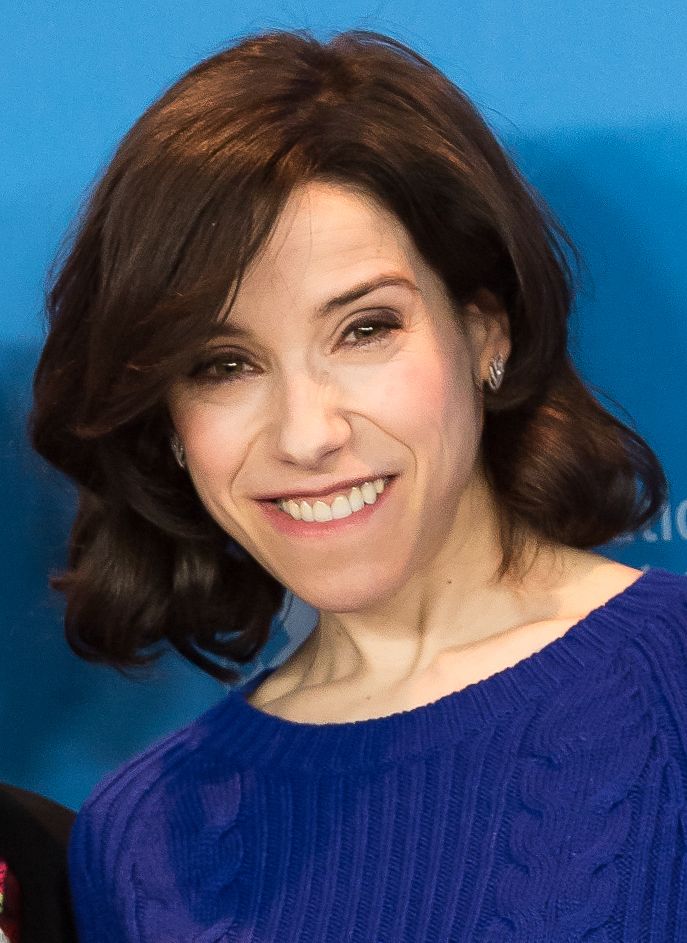
- Hawkins in 2017
Awards and nominations
Award	Wins	Nominations
Academy Awards	0	2
Actor Awards	0	1
BAFTA Awards	0	2
Critics' Choice Awards	0	2
Golden Globe Awards	1	3

Totals (Note: Certain award groups do not simply award one winner. They acknowledge several different recipients, have runners-up, and have third place. Since this is a specific recognition and is different from losing an award, runner-up mentions are considered wins in this award tally. For simplification and to avoid errors, each award in this list has been presumed to have had a prior nomination.)
- Wins: 43
- Nominations: 145

The following is a list of awards and nominations received by British actress Sally Hawkins.

== Major associations ==
=== Academy Awards ===
Year	Category	Nominated work	Result	Ref.
2014	Best Supporting Actress	Blue Jasmine	Nominated	
2018	Best Actress	The Shape of Water	Nominated	

=== Actor Awards ===
Year	Category	Nominated work	Result	Ref.
2018	Outstanding Female Actor in a Leading Role	The Shape of Water	Nominated	

=== BAFTA Awards ===
Year	Category	Nominated work	Result	Ref.
British Academy Film Awards
2014	Best Actress in a Supporting Role	Blue Jasmine	Nominated	
2018	Best Actress in a Leading Role	The Shape of Water	Nominated	

=== Critics' Choice Awards ===
Year	Category	Nominated work	Result	Ref.
Critics' Choice Movie Awards
2018	Best Actress	The Shape of Water	Nominated	
Critics' Choice Super Awards
2025	Best Actress in a Horror Movie	Bring Her Back	Nominated	

=== Golden Globe Awards ===
Year	Category	Nominated work	Result	Ref.
2009	Best Actress in a Motion Picture – Musical or Comedy	Happy-Go-Lucky	Won	
2014	Best Supporting Actress	Blue Jasmine	Nominated	
2018	Best Actress in a Motion Picture – Drama	The Shape of Water	Nominated	

== Other awards ==
=== Berlin International Film Festival ===
Year	Category	Nominated work	Result	Ref.
2008	Best Actress	Happy-Go-Lucky	Won	

=== Independent Spirit Awards ===
Year	Category	Nominated work	Result	Ref.
2014	Best Supporting Female	Blue Jasmine	Nominated	

=== Irish Film & Television Academy Awards ===
Year	Category	Nominated work	Result	Ref.
2018	Best International Actress	Maudie	Nominated	
2018	Best International Actress	The Shape of Water	Nominated	

=== Satellite Awards ===
Year	Category	Nominated work	Result	Ref.
2008	Best Actress – Motion Picture Musical or Comedy	Happy-Go-Lucky	Won	
2010	Best Actress – Motion Picture Musical or Comedy	Made in Dagenham	Nominated	
2014	Best Actress in a Supporting Role	Blue Jasmine	Nominated	
2018	Best Actress in a Motion Picture	The Shape of Water	Won (Note: Tied with Diane Kruger for In the Fade.)	

== Other associations ==
Award	Year	Category	Nominated work	Result	Ref.
AACTA Awards	2026	Best Lead Actress	Bring Her Back	Won	
AACTA International Awards	2014	Best Supporting Actress	Blue Jasmine	Nominated	
AACTA International Awards	2018	Best Actress	The Shape of Water	Nominated	
AACTA International Awards	2022	Best Supporting Actress	Spencer	Nominated	
Alliance of Women Film Journalists	2008	Best Actress	Happy-Go-Lucky	Won (Note: Tied with Kate Winslet for The Reader & Revolutionary Road.)	
Alliance of Women Film Journalists	2008	Best Breakthrough Performance	Happy-Go-Lucky	Won	
Alliance of Women Film Journalists	2008	Best Ensemble Cast	Happy-Go-Lucky	Nominated	
Alliance of Women Film Journalists	2010	Women's Image Award	Made in Dagenham	Nominated	
Alliance of Women Film Journalists	2013	Best Supporting Actress	Blue Jasmine	Nominated	
Alliance of Women Film Journalists	2017	Best Actress	The Shape of Water	Nominated	
Astra Film Awards	2017	Best Actress	The Shape of Water	Won	
Astra Film Awards	2026	Best Performance in a Horror or Thriller	Bring Her Back	Nominated	
Astra Midseason Movie Awards	2025	Best Actress	Bring Her Back	Nominated	
Austin Film Critics Association	2018	Best Actress	The Shape of Water	Nominated	
BAFTA Cymru	2019	Best Actress	Eternal Beauty	Nominated	
British Independent Film Awards	2008	Best Actress	Happy-Go-Lucky	Nominated	
British Independent Film Awards	2010	Best Actress	Made in Dagenham	Nominated	
British Independent Film Awards	2010	Best Supporting Actress	Submarine	Nominated	
British Independent Film Awards	2014	Best Supporting Actress	X+Y	Nominated	
British Independent Film Awards	2019	Best Actress	Eternal Beauty	Nominated	
Boston Society of Film Critics	2008	Best Actress	Happy-Go-Lucky	Won	
Boston Society of Film Critics	2017	Best Actress	The Shape of Water	Won	
Canadian Film Awards	2018	Best Actress	Maudie	Won	
Chicago Film Critics Association	2008	Best Actress	Happy-Go-Lucky	Nominated	
Chicago Film Critics Association	2017	Best Actress	The Shape of Water	Nominated	
Dallas–Fort Worth Film Critics Association	2008	Best Actress	Happy-Go-Lucky	3rd place	
Dallas–Fort Worth Film Critics Association	2013	Best Supporting Actress	Blue Jasmine	5th place	
Dallas–Fort Worth Film Critics Association	2017	Best Actress	The Shape of Water	Won	
Detroit Film Critics Society	2013	Best Ensemble	Blue Jasmine	Nominated	
Detroit Film Critics Society	2017	Best Actress	The Shape of Water	Nominated	
Evening Standard British Film Awards	2008	Peter Sellers Award for Comedy	Happy-Go-Lucky	Won	
Evening Standard British Film Awards	2010	Best Actress	Made in Dagenham	Nominated	
Evening Standard British Film Awards	2017	Best Actress	The Shape of Water	Nominated	
European Film Awards	2008	Best Actress	Happy-Go-Lucky	Nominated	
Florida Film Critics Circle	2017	Best Actress	The Shape of Water	Nominated	
Golden Nymph Awards	2007	Actress in a Television Film	Persuasion	Won	
Hollywood Film Awards	2008	Breakout Actress of the Year	Happy-Go-Lucky	Won	
Houston Film Critics Society	2018	Best Actress	The Shape of Water	Won	
London Film Critics' Circle	2009	British Actress of the Year	Happy-Go-Lucky	Nominated	
London Film Critics' Circle	2014	Supporting Actress of the Year	Blue Jasmine	Nominated	
London Film Critics' Circle	2014	British Actress of the Year	Blue Jasmine	Nominated	
London Film Critics' Circle	2018	Actress of the Year	The Shape of Water	Nominated	
London Film Critics' Circle	2018	British Actress of the Year	Maudie	Won	
London Film Critics' Circle	2018	British Actress of the Year	Paddington 2	Won	
London Film Critics' Circle	2018	British Actress of the Year	The Shape of Water	Won	
Los Angeles Film Critics Association	2008	Best Actress	Happy-Go-Lucky	Won	
Los Angeles Film Critics Association	2017	Best Actress	The Shape of Water	Won	
National Society of Film Critics	2009	Best Actress	Happy-Go-Lucky	Won	
National Society of Film Critics	2018	Best Actress	The Shape of Water	Won	
National Society of Film Critics	2018	Best Actress	Maudie	Won	
New York Film Critics Circle	2008	Best Actress	Happy-Go-Lucky	Won	
New York Film Critics Online	2008	Best Actress	Happy-Go-Lucky	Won	
New York Film Critics Online	2008	Breakthrough Performer	Happy-Go-Lucky	Won	
San Francisco Bay Area Film Critics Circle	2008	Best Actress	Happy-Go-Lucky	Won	
San Francisco Bay Area Film Critics Circle	2017	Best Actress	The Shape of Water	Nominated	
Saturn Awards	2018	Best Actress	The Shape of Water	Nominated	
Toronto Film Critics Association	2017	Best Actress	The Shape of Water	Runner-up	
Vancouver Film Critics Circle	2017	Best Actress	The Shape of Water	Nominated	
Washington D.C. Area Film Critics Association	2017	Best Actress	The Shape of Water	Nominated	
