= List of accolades received by Blue Jasmine =

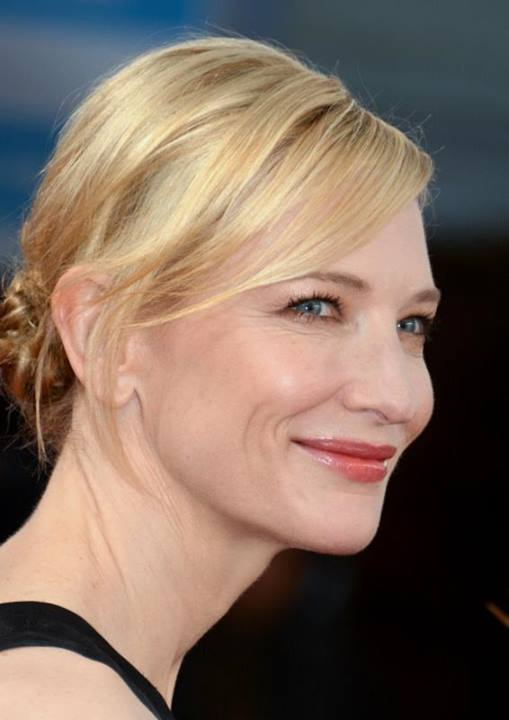
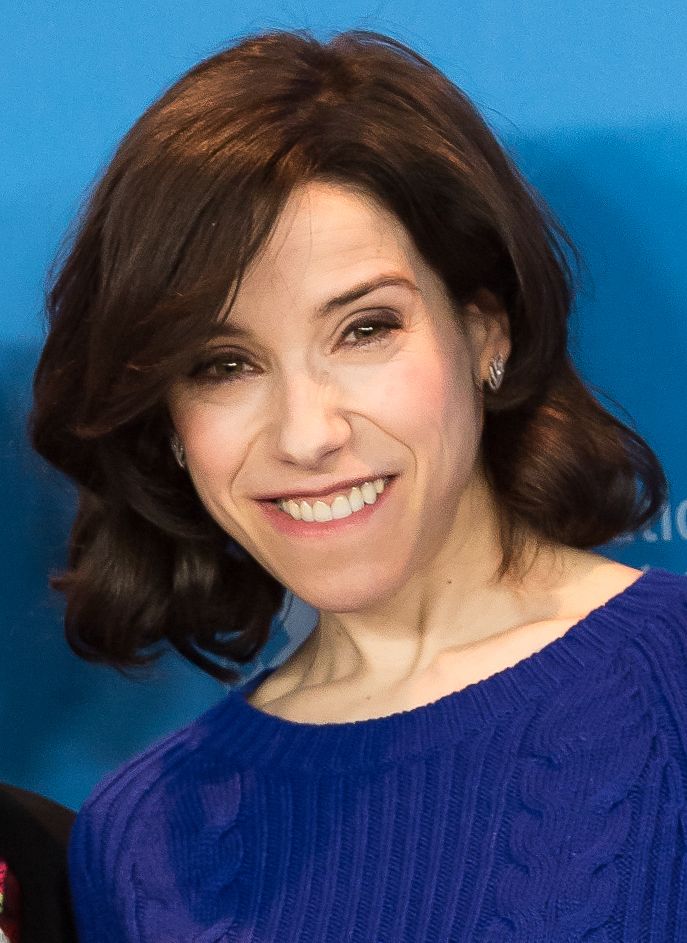
- Cate Blanchett (left) and Sally Hawkins (right) received critical acclaim for their performances in the film, with the former winning the Academy Award for Best Actress.
Accolades
Award	Won	Nominated
AACTA International Awards	1	3
Academy Awards	1	3
Alliance of Women Film Journalists	1	3
Art Directors Guild Awards	0	1
Boston Society of Film Critics	1	1
British Academy Film Awards	1	3
British Independent Film Awards	0	1
Casting Society of America	0	1
Cesar Awards	0	1
Chicago Film Critics Association	1	2
Costume Designers Guild	1	1
Critics’ Choice Awards	1	2
Dallas–Fort Worth Film Critics Association	2	2
Detroit Film Critics Society	0	1
Empire Awards	1	2
Florida Film Critics Circle	1	1
Georgia Film Critics Association	1	2
Golden Globe Awards	1	2
Gotham Awards	0	1
Independent Spirit Awards	1	3
Irish Film & Television Awards	0	1
London Film Critics Circle Awards	1	3
Los Angeles Film Critics Association	1	1
National Society of Film Critics	2	2
New York Film Critics Circle	1	1
New York Film Critics Online	1	1
Online Film Critics Society	1	3
Producers Guild of America Awards	0	1
Santa Barbara International Film Festival	1	1
San Diego Film Critics Society	1	3
San Francisco Film Critics Circle	1	1
Satellite Awards	1	5
Screen Actors Guild Awards	1	1
St. Louis Film Critics Association	1	1
Toronto Film Critics Association	1	1
Vancouver Film Critics Circle	1	1
Washington D.C. Area Film Critics Association	1	2
Writers Guild of America Awards	0	1
- Total number of awards and nominations^{[I]}
Totals	30	66
- References

Blue Jasmine is a 2013 American black comedy-drama film written and directed by Woody Allen. It stars Cate Blanchett as a New York socialite, Jeanette "Jasmine" French, who falls into poverty and homelessness. Alec Baldwin, Louis C.K., Bobby Canavale, Andrew Dice Clay and Sally Hawkins feature in supporting roles. The film premiered in six theaters in New York and Los Angeles on July 26, 2013. Sony Picture Classics later gave it a wide release on August 23, in more than 1,200 theaters in the United States and Canada. The film has grossed a worldwide total of more than $97 million on a production budget of $18 million. Rotten Tomatoes, a review aggregator, surveyed 223 reviews and judged 91 percent to be positive.

Blue Jasmine has garnered awards and nominations in a variety of categories with particular praise for Blanchett's portrayal of the titular protagonist. At the 2014 Academy Awards ceremony, Blue Jasmine had three nominations: Best Actress for Blanchett, Best Supporting Actress for Hawkins and Best Original Screenplay for Allen. Blanchett was the sole winner. At the 2014 Golden Globe Awards ceremony, the film had two nominations: Best Actress in a Motion Picture – Drama for Blanchett and Best Supporting Actress – Motion Picture for Hawkins, with Blanchett going on to win. Blanchett also won Best Actress at the BAFTAs, Screen Actors Guild Awards, Critics’ Choice Awards, Independent Spirit Awards and Satellite Awards. Allen's screenplay was also nominated at the Writers Guild of America Awards.

== Accolades ==
Award / Film Festival	Date of ceremony^{[II]}	Category	Recipient(s)	Result	Ref(s)
AACTA International Awards	January 10, 2014	Best International Actress	Cate Blanchett	Won	
AACTA International Awards	January 10, 2014	Best International Supporting Actress	Sally Hawkins	Nominated	
AACTA International Awards	January 10, 2014	Best International Screenplay	Woody Allen	Nominated	
Academy Awards	March 2, 2014	Best Actress	Cate Blanchett	Won	
Academy Awards	March 2, 2014	Best Supporting Actress	Sally Hawkins	Nominated	
Academy Awards	March 2, 2014	Best Original Screenplay	Woody Allen	Nominated	
Alliance of Women Film Journalists	December 19, 2013	Best Actress	Cate Blanchett	Won	
Alliance of Women Film Journalists	December 19, 2013	Best Actor in a Supporting Role	Bobby Cannavale	Nominated	
Alliance of Women Film Journalists	December 19, 2013	Best Actress in a Supporting Role	Sally Hawkins	Nominated	
Art Directors Guild Awards	February 8, 2014	Excellence in Production Design for a Contemporary Film	Santo Loquasto	Nominated	
Boston Society of Film Critics	December 8, 2013	Best Actress	Cate Blanchett	Won	
British Academy Film Awards	February 16, 2014	Best Actress	Cate Blanchett	Won	
British Academy Film Awards	February 16, 2014	Best Supporting Actress	Sally Hawkins	Nominated	
British Academy Film Awards	February 16, 2014	Best Original Screenplay	Woody Allen	Nominated	
British Independent Film Awards	December 8, 2013	Best International Independent Film	Blue Jasmine	Nominated	
Casting Society of America	January 22, 2015	Studio or Independent Drama	Juliet Taylor, Patricia DiCerto and Nina Henninger	Nominated	
César Awards	February 28, 2014	Best Foreign Film	Blue Jasmine	Nominated	
Chicago Film Critics Association	December 16, 2013	Best Actress	Cate Blanchett	Won	
Chicago Film Critics Association	December 16, 2013	Best Original Screenplay	Woody Allen	Nominated	
Costume Designers Guild	February 22, 2014	Excellence in Contemporary Film	Suzy Benzinger	Won	
Critics’ Choice Awards	January 16, 2014	Best Actress	Cate Blanchett	Won	
Critics’ Choice Awards	January 16, 2014	Best Original Screenplay	Woody Allen	Nominated	
Dallas–Fort Worth Film Critics Association	December 16, 2013	Best Actress	Cate Blanchett	Won	
Dallas–Fort Worth Film Critics Association	December 16, 2013	Best Supporting Actress	Sally Hawkins	5th Place	
Detroit Film Critics Society	December 13, 2013	Best Ensemble	Blue Jasmine	Nominated	
Empire Awards	March 30, 2014	Best Actress	Cate Blanchett	Nominated	
Empire Awards	March 30, 2014	Best Supporting Actress	Sally Hawkins	Won	
Florida Film Critics Circle	December 18, 2013	Best Actress	Cate Blanchett	Won	
Georgia Film Critics Association	January 10, 2014	Best Actress	Cate Blanchett	Won	
Georgia Film Critics Association	January 10, 2014	Best Supporting Actress	Sally Hawkins	Nominated	
Golden Globe Awards	January 12, 2014	Best Actress – Motion Picture Drama	Cate Blanchett	Won	
Golden Globe Awards	January 12, 2014	Best Supporting Actress – Motion Picture	Sally Hawkins	Nominated	
Gotham Awards	December 2, 2013	Best Actress	Cate Blanchett	Nominated	
Independent Spirit Awards	March 1, 2014	Best Female Lead	Cate Blanchett	Won	
Independent Spirit Awards	March 1, 2014	Best Supporting Female	Sally Hawkins	Nominated	
Independent Spirit Awards	March 1, 2014	Best Screenplay	Woody Allen	Nominated	
Irish Film & Television Awards	April 5, 2014	International Actress	Cate Blanchett	Nominated	
London Film Critics' Circle	February 2, 2014	Film of the Year	Blue Jasmine	Nominated	
London Film Critics' Circle	February 2, 2014	Actress of the Year	Cate Blanchett	Won	
London Film Critics' Circle	February 2, 2014	Supporting Actress of the Year	Sally Hawkins	Nominated	
London Film Critics' Circle	February 2, 2014	British Actress of the Year	Sally Hawkins	Nominated	
Los Angeles Film Critics Association	December 8, 2013	Best Actress	Cate Blanchett	Won	
National Society of Film Critics	January 4, 2014	Best Actress	Cate Blanchett	Won	
National Society of Film Critics	January 4, 2014	Best Supporting Actress	Sally Hawkins	3rd Place	
New York Film Critics Circle	December 3, 2013	Best Actress	Cate Blanchett	Won	
New York Film Critics Online	December 8, 2013	Best Actress	Cate Blanchett	Won	
Online Film Critics Society	December 16, 2013	Best Actress	Cate Blanchett	Won	
Online Film Critics Society	December 16, 2013	Best Supporting Actress	Sally Hawkins	Nominated	
Online Film Critics Society	December 16, 2013	Best Original Screenplay	Woody Allen	Nominated	
Producers Guild of America Awards	January 19, 2014	Best Theatrical Motion Picture	Letty Aronson and Stephen Tenenbaum	Nominated	
San Diego Film Critics Society	December 11, 2013	Best Actress	Cate Blanchett	Won	
San Diego Film Critics Society	December 11, 2013	Best Supporting Actress	Sally Hawkins	Nominated	
San Diego Film Critics Society	December 11, 2013	Best Original Screenplay	Woody Allen	Nominated	
San Francisco Film Critics Circle	December 15, 2013	Best Actress	Cate Blanchett	Won	
Santa Barbara International Film Festival	February 9, 2014	Outstanding Performer of the Year	Cate Blanchett	Won	
Satellite Awards	February 23, 2014	Best Motion Picture	Blue Jasmine	Nominated	
Satellite Awards	February 23, 2014	Best Director	Woody Allen	Nominated	
Satellite Awards	February 23, 2014	Best Actress – Motion Picture	Cate Blanchett	Won	
Satellite Awards	February 23, 2014	Best Supporting Actress – Motion Picture	Sally Hawkins	Nominated	
Satellite Awards	February 23, 2014	Best Original Screenplay	Woody Allen	Nominated	
Screen Actors Guild Awards	January 18, 2014	Outstanding Performance by a Female Actor in a Leading Role	Cate Blanchett	Won	
St. Louis Film Critics Association	December 9, 2013	Best Actress	Cate Blanchett	Won	
Toronto Film Critics Association	December 17, 2013	Best Actress	Cate Blanchett	Won	
Vancouver Film Critics Circle	January 7, 2014	Best Actress	Cate Blanchett	Won	
Washington D.C. Area Film Critics Association	December 9, 2013	Best Actress	Cate Blanchett	Won	
Washington D.C. Area Film Critics Association	December 9, 2013	Best Original Screenplay	Woody Allen	Nominated	
Writers Guild of America Awards	February 1, 2014	Best Original Screenplay	Woody Allen	Nominated	

^{^[I]} Certain award groups do not simply award one winner. They recognize several different recipients and have runners-up. Since this is a specific recognition and is different from losing an award, runner-up mentions are considered wins in this award tally.
^{^[II]} Each date is linked to the article about the awards held that year, wherever possible.

== See also ==
- 2013 in film
