= List of Sally Hawkins performances =

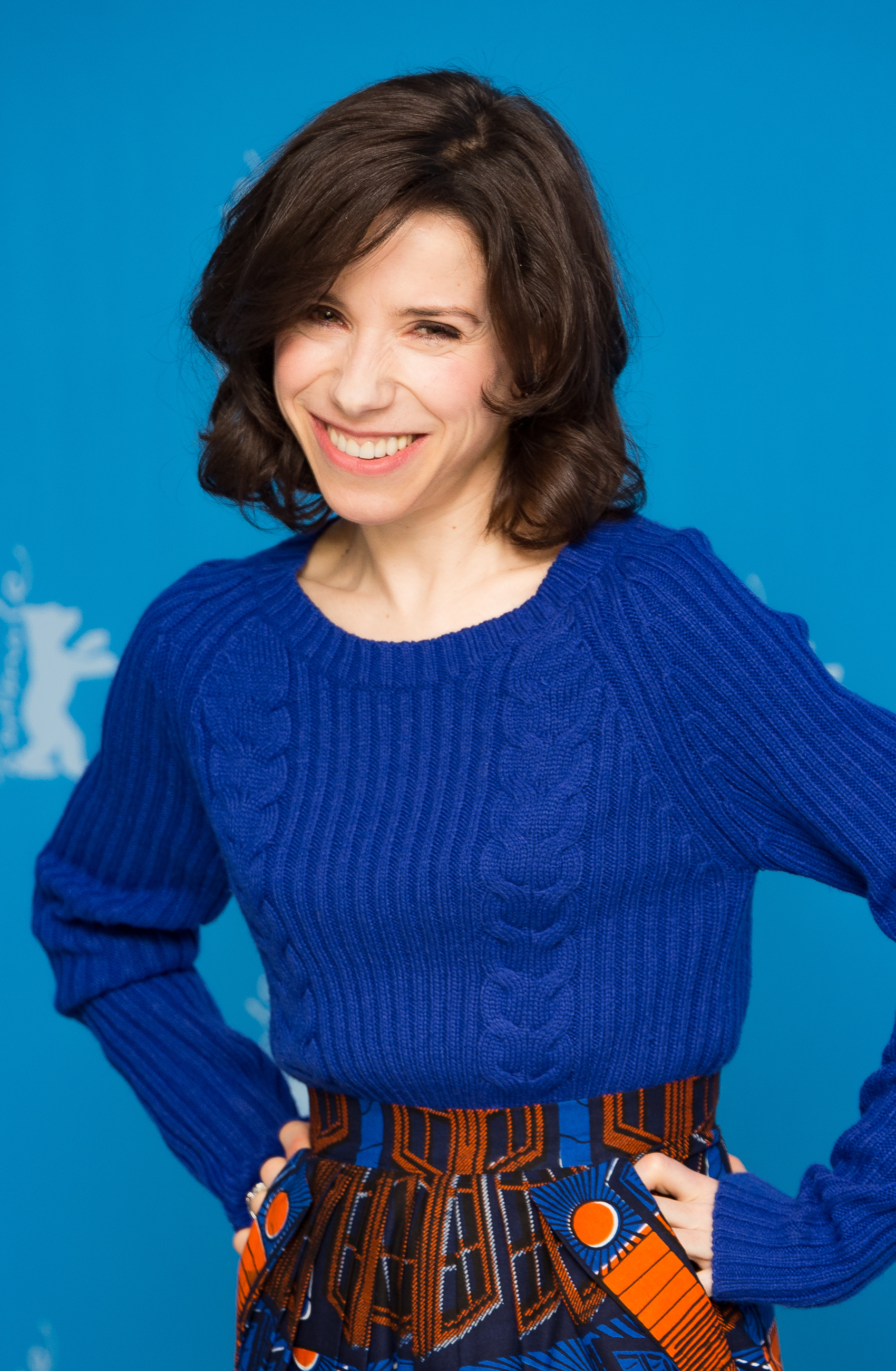
Hawkins at the 2017 Berlin International Film Festival

Sally Hawkins is an English actress. Beginning her collaboration with Mike Leigh on All or Nothing in 2002, she would also appear in Vera Drake (2004) and star as Poppy Cross in Happy-Go-Lucky (2008). Her breakout role, Hawkins would win several awards for her performance, including the Golden Globe Award for Best Actress in a Motion Picture – Musical or Comedy.

In 2005, Hawkins co-starred in the BBC mini-series Fingersmith, playing a Victorian thief who falls in love with the woman she is conning. For her performance in the romantic drama Blue Jasmine (2013), Hawkins earned a nomination for the Academy Award for Best Supporting Actress. She received another Academy Award nomination for starring as a mute cleaning woman in the American romantic supernatural film The Shape of Water (2017).

Other notable performances include as the leads in Made in Dagenham (2010) and Maudie (2016) in addition to appearing in franchise films Paddington (2014) and Paddington 2 (2017) as Mrs Brown, and as Vivienne Graham in Godzilla (2014) and Godzilla: King of the Monsters (2019).

== Filmography ==
=== Film ===
Year	Title	Role	Notes
1999	Star Wars: Episode I – The Phantom Menace	Villager	Uncredited extra
2002	All or Nothing	Samantha	
2004	Vera Drake	Susan Wells	
2004	Layer Cake	Slasher	
2006	Hollow China	Terri	Short film
2007	Cassandra's Dream	Kate	
2007	WΔZ	Elly Carpenter	
2008	Happy-Go-Lucky	Poppy Cross	
2009	An Education	Sarah Goldman	
2009	Desert Flower	Marylin	
2009	Happy Ever Afters	Maura	
2010	It's a Wonderful Afterlife	Linda / Gitali	
2010	Never Let Me Go	Miss Lucy	
2010	Made in Dagenham	Rita O'Grady	
2010	Submarine	Jill Tate	
2011	Love Birds	Holly	
2011	Jane Eyre	Mrs Reed	
2012	Great Expectations	Mrs Joe	
2013	All Is Bright	Olga	
2013	Blue Jasmine	Ginger	
2013	The Double	Receptionist at Ball	Cameo
2013	The Phone Call	Heather	Short film
2014	Godzilla	Dr. Vivienne Graham	
2014	X+Y	Julie Ellis	
2014	Paddington	Mary Brown	
2016	Maudie	Maud Lewis	
2017	The Shape of Water	Elisa Esposito	
2017	Paddington 2	Mary Brown	
2019	Godzilla: King of the Monsters	Dr. Vivienne Graham	
2019	Eternal Beauty	Jane	
2021	Spencer	Maggie	
2021	The Phantom of the Open	Jean Flitcroft	
2021	A Boy Called Christmas	Mother Vodol	
2022	The Lost King	Philippa Langley	
2023	Kensuke's Kingdom	Mum	Voice
2023	Wonka	Mrs. Wonka	
2025	Bring Her Back	Laura	
2027	Eloise		Post-production

=== Television ===
Year	Title	Role	Notes
1999	Casualty	Emma Lister	Episode: "To Have and to Hold"
2000	Doctors	Sarah Carne	Episode: "Pretty Baby"
2002	Tipping the Velvet	Zena Blake	2 episodes
2003–2005	Little Britain	Cathy	3 episodes
2003	Promoted to Glory	Lisa	Television film
2003	The Young Visiters	Rosalind	Television film
2003	Byron	Mary Shelley	Television film
2004	Bunk Bed Boys	Helen	Television film
2005	Fingersmith	Susan Trinder	2 episodes
2005	Twenty Thousand Streets Under the Sky	Ella	3 episodes
2006	Shiny Shiny Bright New Hole in My Heart	Nathalie	Television film
2006	H. G. Wells: War with the World	Rebecca West	Television film
2006	Man to Man with Dean Learner	Various characters	3 episodes
2007	Persuasion	Anne Elliot	Television film
2007	The Everglades		Television short, also writer
2011	Little Crackers	Mummy	Episode: "Barbara Windsor's Little Cracker: My First Brassiere"
2012	Room on the Broom	Bird (voice)	Television short
2014	How and Why	Yvonne Hesselman	Pilot
2015	Stick Man	Stick Lady (voice)	Television short
2016	The Hollow Crown	Eleanor, Duchess of Gloucester	Episode: "Henry VI, Part I"
2019	The Snail and the Whale	Sea Snail (voice)	Television short
2022	Mammals	Lue	5 episodes
2022	The Smeds and The Smoos	Narrator (voice)	Television short

== Theatre ==
Year	Title	Role	Venue
1998	Accidental Death of an Anarchist		Battersea Arts Centre
1998	Romeo and Juliet	Juliet Capulet	York Theatre Royal
1999	The Dybbuk	Leah	Battersea Arts Centre
1999	The Cherry Orchard	Anya Ranevskaya	York Theatre Royal
1999	Svejk	Kidnapped Dog	Gate Theatre
2000	A Midsummer Night's Dream	Hermia	Open Air Theatre
2000	Much Ado About Nothing	Hero	Open Air Theatre
2001	Misconceptions	Zoe	Octagon Theatre
2004	Country Music	Lynsey Sargeant	Royal Court Theatre
2005	The House of Bernarda Alba	Adela Alba	Royal National Theatre
2006	The Winterling	Lue	Royal Court Theatre
2010	Mrs. Warren's Profession	Vivie Warren	American Airlines Theatre
2012	Constellations	Marianne	Royal Court Theatre; Duke of York's Theatre
2015	Letters Live	Reader	Freemasons' Hall

== Radio ==
Year	Title	Role	Notes
2002	Concrete Cow	Various roles	BBC Radio 4 Also writer
2004	Think the Unthinkable		BBC Radio 4
2004	The Cenci Family	Beatrice Cenci	BBC Radio 4
2004–2005, 2007	Ed Reardon's Week	Ping	BBC Radio 4
2005	Cash Cows	Kerry	BBC Radio 4
2005	War with the Newts	Olga	BBC Radio 4
2005	The Party Line		BBC Radio 4
2005	Afternoon Romancers	Liz	BBC Radio 4
2006	Salome	Joanna	BBC Radio 3
2007	Cut to the Heart	Alice	BBC Radio 4
2007	Demonstrating Grace	Narrator	BBC Radio 4
2010	Greed All About It	Alice	BBC Radio 4
2011	Revolution	Therese	BBC Radio 4
2015	Book at Bedtime: The Girl on the Train	Narrator	BBC Radio 4
