= Miggy Biller =

British mathematics teacher

Margherita Joan Biller MBE
- Occupation: Mathematics educator
- Spouse: Peter Biller

Academic work
- Discipline: Mathematics
- Institutions: York College; St Peter's School, York
- Notable students: Daniel Lightwing

Margherita Joan "Miggy" Biller is a British mathematics teacher, the head of mathematics at York College. She was named an MBE in the 2016 New Year Honours "for services to mathematics in further education".

Biller taught mathematics at St Peter's School, York before moving to York College in 1988. At York College, she taught mathematics prodigy Daniel Lightwing, after whom the main character of the film X+Y was modelled. Her husband, Peter Biller, is a historian at the University of York.
