= New York Film Critics Online Award for Best Actress =

The New York Film Critics Online Award for Best Actress is an award given annually by the New York Film Critics Online. It was first introduced in 2001 to reward the best performance by a leading actress.

== Winners ==
=== 2000s ===
Year	Winner(s)	Film	Role
2001	Judi Dench	Iris	Iris Murdoch
2002	Julianne Moore	Far from Heaven	Cathleen Whitaker
2003	Charlize Theron	Monster	Aileen Wuornos
2004	Imelda Staunton	Vera Drake	Vera Drake
2005	Keira Knightley	Pride & Prejudice	Elizabeth Bennet
2006	Helen Mirren	The Queen	Elizabeth II
2007	Julie Christie	Away from Her	Fiona Anderson
2008	Sally Hawkins	Happy-Go-Lucky	Poppy Cross
2009	Meryl Streep	Julie and Julia	Julia Child

=== 2010s ===
Year	Winner	Film	Role
2010	Natalie Portman	Black Swan	Nina Sayers
2011	Meryl Streep	The Iron Lady	Margaret Thatcher
2012	Emmanuelle Riva	Amour	Anne Laurent
2013	Cate Blanchett	Blue Jasmine	Jeanette "Jasmine" Francis
2014	Marion Cotillard	Two Days, One Night	Sandra Bya
2015	Brie Larson	Room	Joy "Ma" Newsome
2016	Isabelle Huppert	Elle	Michèle Leblanc
2017	Margot Robbie	I, Tonya	Tonya Harding
2018	Melissa McCarthy	Can You Ever Forgive Me?	Lee Israel
2019	Lupita Nyong'o	Us	Adelaide Wilson / Red

=== 2020s ===
Year	Winner	Film	Role
2020	Carey Mulligan	Promising Young Woman	Cassandra "Cassie" Thomas
2021	Tessa Thompson	Passing	Irene
2022	Michelle Yeoh	Everything Everywhere All At Once	Evelyn Wang
2023	Sandra Hüller	Anatomy of a Fall	Sandra Voyter
2024	Marianne Jean-Baptiste	Hard Truths	Pansy Deacon
2025	Jessie Buckley	Hamnet	Agnes Shakespeare

== Multiple winners ==
2 wins

- Meryl Streep (2009, 2011)

== See also ==
- Los Angeles Film Critics Association Award for Best Actress
- National Board of Review Award for Best Actress
- New York Film Critics Circle Award for Best Actress
- National Society of Film Critics Award for Best Actress
