= Morgan Matthews =

Morgan Matthews may refer to:

- Morgan Matthews (figure skater), American ice dancer
- Morgan Matthews (filmmaker), English filmmaker
- Morgan Matthews, a character from the TV series Boy Meets World
