= Vampires, Pirates & Aliens =

- Based on: Vampires, Pirates and Aliens by Colin Hawkins and Jacqui Hawkins
- Countries of origin: United Kingdom; France
- No. of episodes: 26 (78 segments)

Production
- Running time: 25 minutes
- Production companies: Cosgrove Hall Films; France Animation; Millimages

Original release
- Network: ITV
- Release: 13 March 2000 – 14 February 2001

Vampires, Pirates & Aliens is a British-French children's television programme by Cosgrove Hall Films based on the book by Colin Hawkins and Jacqui Hawkins. The story follows the adventures of the vampire known as "the Blods", and features a ship named "The Mad Maggot" including the character "Captain Blunder" and crew.

== Voices ==
- Keith Wickham
- Kate Harbour
- David Vickery
- Melissa Sinden

== Episodes ==
1. Bonus Phalonus, SneezeAhoy, Sticky Together
2. A Vile-in Experience, The Regatta, When You Wish Upon A Planet
3. Sale Of The Century, Roger’s P-45, Dekko The Milkman
4. Home Movies, Hunt The Spud, The Lonely Hearts Club
5. The Vampirates, Close Encounters Of The Smelly Kind, Roller Coaster
6. The Slug’s Tail, Unlucky In Luck, Fangs For The Memory
7. Now You See Me, Sweaty Sam’s Treasure, Food, Glorious Food
8. Camp Fright, A Stitch In Brine, Once Upon A Time …
9. Tombed Love, Wheel Of Misfortune, Game Showdown
10. The Spoilt Prince Of Egypt, Scaredy Cat, Lunch Pad
11. Mister Gory And Mister Hyde, Brown Beard The Pirate, The Pilbeam Factor
12. Great Aunt Olga, Scuppered!, The Star Crossed Lovers
13. Dr. Yeti, The Veti, Luck Be A Pirate Tonight, A Dog’s Dinner
14. Twinkle, Twinkle Little Vampire, I Spy, Greenery
15. On The Piste, Mother’s Day, Abandon Ship
16. Parakeets And Spiders, The Shark God, Unrequited Love
17. Hide And Shriek, Luncheon Vulture, That Shrinking Feeling
18. Big Baby Monster, The Loch Ness Mistake, The Jewel In The Control Panel
19. Heartburn Hotel, A Fine Kettle Of Fish, The Alien Liberation Front
20. Bad Lair Day, The Tubmarine, Ray Fever
21. Things That Go Bump, Easy Queasy, Which Way is Up?
22. Fangs Giving Day, Twue Love, Chez Mirage
23. Fair’s Fair, Whittle While You Work, The Flatworm Has Turned
24. Cute-agious!, Merman, Rock Asteroid, Sorry Star
25. Freaky Leaky, Once A Pirate, Face Lift Off
26. Ups And Downs, That Little X-tra Something, Baby Space

"Vampires, Pirates & Aliens: Bloodsucking Beasties! (Vol 1)", a DVD containing 7 episodes, was released on 23 April 2008.
