= Peter Biller =

British historian

Peter Biller FBA FRHistS
- Spouse: Miggy Biller

Academic background
- Education: St Benedict's School, Ealing
- Alma mater: Oriel College, Oxford

Academic work
- Discipline: Medieval history
- Institutions: University of York

Peter Biller FBA FRHistS is Emeritus Professor of Medieval History at the University of York, where he has taught since 1970. Biller is general editor of the York Medieval Press, a Fellow of the Royal Historical Society and a Fellow of the British Academy. His research interests include academic thought, heresy, inquisition including AHRB funded research on inquisition trials, and medicine in medieval Europe. He is a member of the board of Bollettino della Società di Studi Valdesi. He is married to mathematician Miggy Biller.

== Education and fellowships ==
St Benedict's School, Ealing; Oriel College, Oxford (BA Modern Hist. 1966; MA 1970; DPhil 1974; Hon. Fellow 2017). FRHistS 1987. FBA 2012. Honorary Fellow Oriel College Oxford 2017. Corresponding Fellow Medieval Academy of America 2022.

== Selected publications ==
- Biller, Peter; Hudson, Anne, eds. (1996). Heresy and Literacy, 1000-1530. Cambridge: Cambridge University Press. ISBN 978-0-521-57576-8.
- The Waldenses 1170-1530: Between a Religious Order and a Church. Ashgate Publishing, Aldershot, 2001. Variorum Collected Studies
- The Measure of Multitude: Population in Medieval Thought. Oxford University Press, Oxford, 2000.
