= Beautiful Young Minds =

British television documentary

- Genre: Television documentary
- Directed by: Morgan Matthews
- Composer: Sam Hooper
- Country of origin: United Kingdom
- Original language: English

Production
- Executive producers: Richard Klein; Edmund Coulthard; Grant McKee
- Producer: David Brindley
- Production locations: United Kingdom; Slovenia
- Editor: Joby Gee
- Camera setup: Single-camera
- Running time: 90 minutes
- Production company: Blast! Films

Original release
- Network: BBC Two
- Release: 14 October 2007

Beautiful Young Minds is a documentary first shown at the BRITDOC Festival on 26 July 2007 and first broadcast on BBC 2 on 14 October 2007. The documentary follows the selection process and training for the U.K. team to compete in the 2006 International Mathematical Olympiad (IMO), as well as the actual event in Slovenia. Many of the young mathematicians featured in the film had a form of autism, which the documentary links to mathematical ability. The team goes on to win numerous medals at the IMO, including four silver and one bronze. It was directed by Morgan Matthews, edited by Joby Gee and featured music by Sam Hooper. It was also screened at the Bath Film Festival in October 2007. The documentary inspired the 2014 film X+Y, which was also directed by Morgan Matthews, based on IMO participant Daniel Lightwing.

== Awards ==
| Year | Award | Category | Result |
|---|---|---|---|
| 2007 | Prix Europa | Television Documentary | Nominated |
| 2008 | British Academy Television Awards | Best Single Documentary | Nominated |
| 2008 | RTS Craft & Design Award | Best Tape and Film Editing: Documentary/Factual | Nominated |
| 2008 | RTS Television Award | Best Observational Documentary | Nominated |
