= Anne Hudson (literary historian) =

British literary historian and academic (1938–2021)

Anne Hudson FBA FRHistS
- Born: Anne Mary Hudson; 28 August 1938
- Died: 8 December 2021 (aged 83)

Academic background
- Education: Dartford Grammar School for Girls
- Alma mater: St Hugh's College, Oxford

Academic work
- Discipline: English Literature
- Sub-discipline: Literary history; Medieval English; John Wycliffe; Lollardism
- Institutions: Lady Margaret Hall, Oxford; University of Oxford

Anne Mary Hudson, FBA, FRHistS (28 August 1938 – 8 December 2021) was a British literary historian and academic. She was a Fellow of Lady Margaret Hall, Oxford from 1963 to 2003, and Professor of Medieval English at the University of Oxford from 1989 to 2003.

== Early life and education ==
Hudson was born on 28 August 1938. She was educated at Dartford Grammar School for Girls, an all-girls state grammar school in Dartford, Kent. From 1957 to 1960, she studied English at St Hugh's College, Oxford, graduating with a first class Bachelor of Arts (BA) degree; as per tradition, her BA was promoted to a Master of Arts (MA Oxon) degree. She also undertook postgraduate research at Oxford in relation to Robert of Gloucester's English chronicle, and completed her Doctor of Philosophy (DPhil) degree in 1964.

== Academic career ==
From 1961 to 1963 Hudson was a college lecturer in Medieval English at Lady Margaret Hall, Oxford. In 1963, she was elected a Fellow of LMH and appointed a Tutor in English. She also held positions in the Faculty of English Language and Literature of University of Oxford: she was a CUF lecturer from 1963 to 1981, a special lecturer from 1981 to 1983, held a British Academy Readership in the Humanities from 1983 to 1986, was a lecturer in Medieval English from 1986 to 1989, before being appointed Professor of Medieval English in 1989. She retired from full-time academia in 2003, and was made an honorary fellow of Lady Margaret Hall.

In addition to her university posts she held a number of senior appointments at the Early English Text Society: she served as its executive secretary from 1969 to 1982 and as its director from 2006 to 2013, and she was a member of its council since 1982.

Hudson's research interests included John Wycliffe, Wycliffite writing and the Lollards.

== Honours ==
In 1976 Hudson was elected a Fellow of the Royal Historical Society (FRHistS). She has twice been awarded the Sir Israel Gollancz Prize by the British Academy; in 1985 and in 1991. In 1988 she was elected a Fellow of the British Academy (FBA), the United Kingdom's national academy for the humanities and the social sciences.

A Festschrift was published in her honour in 2005: Text and Controversy from Wyclif to Bale: Essays in Honour of Anne Hudson, edited by Helen Barr and Ann M. Hutchison.

== Later life ==
Hudson died on 8 December 2021, aged 83.

== Selected works ==
- Hudson, Anne, ed. (1978). Selections from English Wycliffite Writings. Cambridge: Cambridge University Press. ISBN 9780521282581.
- Hudson, Anne (1988). The Premature Reformation: Wycliffite Texts and Lollard History. Oxford: Clarendon Press. ISBN 978-0-19-822762-5.
- Hudson, Anne, ed. (1993). Two Wycliffite Texts: The Sermon of William Taylor 1406, the Testimony of William Thorpe 1407. Oxford: Early English Text Society. ISBN 978-0-19-722303-1.
- Biller, Peter; Hudson, Anne, eds. (1996). Heresy and Literacy, 1000-1530. Cambridge: Cambridge University Press. ISBN 978-0-521-57576-8.
- Hudson, Anne (2003). Lollards and their Books. London: Bloomsbury Academic. ISBN 978-0-907628-60-6.
- Hudson, Anne (2008). Studies in the Transmission of Wyclif's Writings. Farnham: Ashgate. ISBN 978-0-7546-5964-8.
- Hudson, Anne (2015). Doctors in English: A Study of the Wycliffite Gospel Commentaries. Liverpool: Liverpool University Press. ISBN 978-1-78138-131-1.
