= York Medieval Press =

British publisher

- Parent company: Boydell & Brewer
- Country of origin: United Kingdom
- Headquarters location: Suffolk
- Publication types: Books
- Nonfiction topics: Medieval studies
- Official website: boydellandbrewer.com

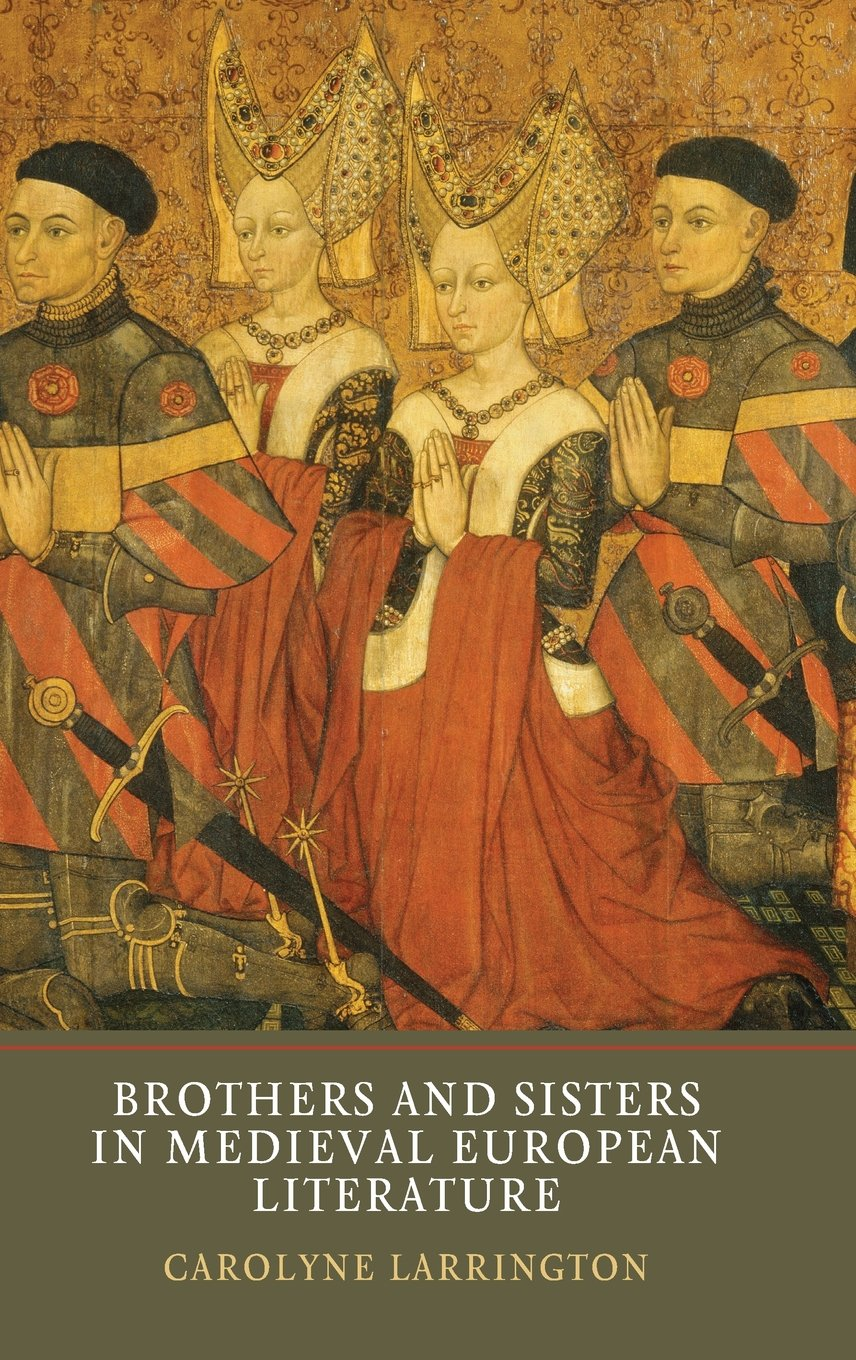
Brothers and Sisters in Medieval European Literature by Carolyne Larrington, published by the York Medieval Press.

The York Medieval Press is a publishing joint venture between the University of York Centre for Medieval Studies and Boydell & Brewer. The venture specialises in interdisciplinary study that aims to bring a fresh approach to medieval culture. The general editor of the press is professor Peter Biller.

== Selected titles ==
- Abortion in the Early Middle Ages, c.500-900. Zubin Mistry. ISBN 9781903153574
- The Age of Edward III. Edited by J.S. Bothwell. ISBN 9781903153062
- The Anglo-Norman Language and its Contexts. Edited by Richard Ingham. ISBN 9781903153307
- Brothers and Sisters in Medieval European Literature. Carolyne Larrington. ISBN 9781903153628
- Cistercians, Heresy and Crusade in Occitania, 1145-1229, Preaching in the Lord's Vineyard. Beverly Mayne Kienzle. ISBN 9781903153000
- Creating the Monastic Past in Medieval Flanders. Karine Ugé. ISBN 9781903153161
