= Vancouver Film Critics Circle Award for Best Actress =

Canadian film award

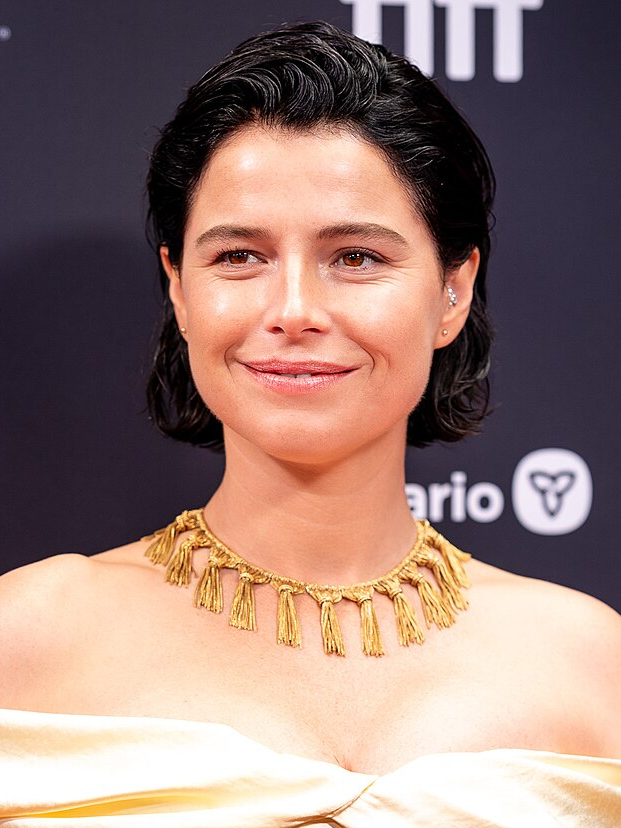
The 2025 recipient: Jessie Buckley

The Vancouver Film Critics Circle Award for Best Actress is an annual award given by the Vancouver Film Critics Circle.

== Winners and nominees ==
=== 2000s ===
Year	Winner and nominees	Film	Role
2000	Laura Linney	You Can Count on Me	Samantha "Sammy" Prescott
2000	Ellen Burstyn	Requiem for a Dream	Sara Goldfarb
2000	Michelle Yeoh	Crouching Tiger, Hidden Dragon	Yu Shu Lien
2001	Sissy Spacek	In the Bedroom	Ruth Fowler
2001	Thora Birch	Ghost World	Enid
2001	Audrey Tautou	Amélie (Le fabuleux destin d'Amélie Poulain)	Amélie Poulain
2002	Julianne Moore	Far from Heaven	Cathy Whitaker
2002	Maggie Gyllenhaal	Secretary	Lee Holloway
2002	Nicole Kidman	The Hours	Virginia Woolf
2002	Diane Lane	Unfaithful	Constance Sumner
2002	Meryl Streep	The Hours	Clarissa Vaughan
2003	Charlize Theron	Monster	Aileen Wuornos
2003	Jennifer Connelly	House of Sand and Fog	Kathy Nicolo
2003	Scarlett Johansson	Lost in Translation	Charlotte
2004	Imelda Staunton	Vera Drake	Vera Drake
2004	Laura Linney	Kinsey	Clara McMillen
2004	Hilary Swank	Million Dollar Baby	Maggie Fitzgerald
2005	Felicity Huffman	Transamerica	Stanley Schupak / Bree Osbourne
2005	Laura Linney	The Squid and the Whale	Joan Berkman
2005	Charlize Theron	North Country	Josey Aimes
2005	Naomi Watts	King Kong	Ann Darrow
2006	Helen Mirren	The Queen	Queen Elizabeth II
2006	Judi Dench	Notes on a Scandal	Barbara Covett
2006	Kate Winslet	Little Children	Sarah Pierce
2007	Marion Cotillard	La Vie en Rose (La môme)	Édith Piaf
2007	Anamaria Marinca	4 Months, 3 Weeks, and 2 Days	Otilia Mihartescu
2007	Elliot Page (Note: Credited as Ellen Page)	Juno	Juno MacGuff
2008	Kate Winslet	The Reader	Hanna Schmitz
2008	Kate Winslet	Revolutionary Road	April Wheeler
2008	Sally Hawkins	Happy-Go-Lucky	Pauline "Poppy" Cross
2008	Meryl Streep	Doubt	Sister Aloysius Beauvier
2009	Carey Mulligan	An Education	Jenny Miller
2009	Gabourey Sidibe	Precious	Claireece "Precious" Jones
2009	Meryl Streep	Julie & Julia	Julia Child

=== 2010s ===
Year	Winner and nominees	Film	Role
2010	Jennifer Lawrence	Winter's Bone	Ree Dolly
2010	Annette Bening	The Kids Are All Right	Dr. Nicole "Nic" Allgood
2010	Natalie Portman	Black Swan	Nina Sayers
2011	Elizabeth Olsen	Martha Marcy May Marlene	Martha
2011	Meryl Streep	The Iron Lady	Margaret Thatcher
2011	Michelle Williams	My Week with Marilyn	Marilyn Monroe
2012	Jessica Chastain	Zero Dark Thirty	Maya
2012	Marion Cotillard	Rust and Bone	Stéphanie
2012	Jennifer Lawrence	Silver Linings Playbook	Tiffany Maxwell
2013	Cate Blanchett	Blue Jasmine	Jeanette "Jasmine" Francis
2013	Sandra Bullock	Gravity	Dr. Ryan Stone
2013	Greta Gerwig	Frances Ha	Frances Halladay
2014	Tilda Swinton	Only Lovers Left Alive	Eve
2014	Marion Cotillard	The Immigrant	Ewa Cybulska
2014	Reese Witherspoon	Wild	Cheryl Strayed
2015	Brie Larson	Room	Joy "Ma" Newsome
2015	Cate Blanchett	Carol	Carol Aird
2015	Saoirse Ronan	Brooklyn	Eilis Lacey
2016	Isabelle Huppert	Elle	Michèle Leblanc
2016	Amy Adams	Arrival	Dr. Louise Banks
2016	Natalie Portman	Jackie	Jackie Kennedy
2017	Saoirse Ronan	Lady Bird	Christine "Lady Bird" McPherson
2017	Sally Hawkins	The Shape of Water	Elisa Esposito
2017	Frances McDormand	Three Billboards Outside Ebbing, Missouri	Mildred Hayes
2018	Olivia Colman	The Favourite	Anne, Queen of Great Britain
2018	Regina Hall	Support the Girls	Lisa Conroy
2018	Melissa McCarthy	Can You Ever Forgive Me?	Lee Israel
2019	Scarlett Johansson	Marriage Story	Nicole Barber
2019	Lupita Nyong'o	Us	Adelaide Wilson / Red
2019	Saoirse Ronan	Little Women	Josephine "Jo" March

=== 2020s ===
Year	Winner and nominees	Film	Role	Ref
2020	Frances McDormand	Nomadland	Fern	
2020	Viola Davis	Ma Rainey's Black Bottom	Ma Rainey	
2020	Carey Mulligan	Promising Young Woman	Cassandra "Cassie" Thomas	
2021	Olivia Colman	The Lost Daughter	Leda Caruso	
2021	Jessica Chastain	The Eyes of Tammy Faye	Tammy Faye Bakker	
2021	Renate Reinsve	The Worst Person in the World	Julie	
2022	Michelle Yeoh	Everything Everywhere All At Once	Evelyn Wang	
2022	Cate Blanchett	Tár	Lydia Tár	
2022	Janelle Monáe	Glass Onion: A Knives Out Mystery	Helen and Andi Brand	
2023	Sandra Hüller	Anatomy of a Fall	Sandra Voyter	
2023	Annette Bening	Nyad	Diana Nyad	
2023	Emma Stone	Poor Things	Bella Baxter / Victoria Blessington	
2024	Mikey Madison	Anora	Anora "Ani" Mikheeva	
2024	Demi Moore	The Substance	Elisabeth Sparkle	
2024	Saoirse Ronan	The Outrun	Rona	
2025	Jessie Buckley	Hamnet	Agnes Shakespeare	
2025	Rose Byrne	If I Had Legs I'd Kick You	Linda	
2025	Renate Reinsve	Sentimental Value	Nora Borg	
