= Beverly Mayne Kienzle =

American linguist (born 1947)

Beverly Mayne Kienzle (born 1947) is a specialist in Christian Latin, Latin paleography, and medieval Christianity. She was the John H. Morison professor of the practice in latin and romance languages at the Harvard Divinity School, Harvard University. She has published over seventy articles and fifteen books, including five on Hildegard of Bingen. Her latest book is an authoritative biography of her grandmother, Virginia Cary Hudson, author of the best-selling O Ye Jigs and Juleps!.

== Selected publications ==
- Virginia Cary Hudson, The Jigs and Juleps! Girl: Her Life and Writings, iUniverse, 2016.
- The Solutions to 38 Questions of Hildegard of Bingen, English translation (with Jenny Bledsoe and Stephen Behnke) Introduction and notes by Beverly Mayne Kienzle and Jenny C. Bledsoe. Collegeville, MN: Cistercian Publications and Liturgical Press, 2014.
- The Gospel Homilies of Hildegard of Bingen, English translation and Introduction. Collegeville, MN: Cistercian Publications and Liturgical Press, 2011.
- Hildegard of Bingen and her Gospel Homilies: Speaking New Mysteries, Medieval Women and Texts 12, Turnhout: Brepols, 2009.
- Hildegard of Bingen. Expositiones evangeliorum, in Hildegardis Bingensis, Opera minora. Co-edited with Carolyn Muessig. Corpus Christianorum, Continuatio Mediaevalis 226. Turnhout: Brepols, 2007, pp. 135–333.
- Cistercians, Heresy and Crusade in Occitania, 1145-1229, Preaching in the Lord's Vineyard. York Medieval Press, 2001. ISBN 9781903153000
- A Handbook to Catherine of Siena. Leiden: Brill, 2011. (co-editor with Carolyn A. Muessig and George Ferzoco)
- A Handbook to Hildegard of Bingen. Leiden: Brill, 2013. (co-editor with Debra L. Stoudt and George Ferzoco)
- The Sermon. Typologie des sources du moyen âge occidental, fasc. 81-83. General editor and author of “The Twelfth-Century Monastic Sermon,” pp. 271–323, Introduction, 143–174, and Conclusion 963–983. Turnhout: Brepols, 2000.
- Women Preachers and Prophets Through Two Millennia of Christianity. Co-edited with Pamela J. Walker. University of California Press, 1998.
- Medieval Sermons and Society: Cloister, City, University. Co-edited with Jacqueline Hamesse, Debra Stoudt, and Anne Thayer. F.I.D.E.M., Textes et études du Moyen Age, 9. Louvain-la-Neuve, 1998.
- Models of Holiness in Medieval Sermons. Proceedings of the International Symposium (Kalamazoo, 4–7 May 1995), ed., B.M. Kienzle, Edith Dolnikowski, Rosemary Drage Hale, Darleen Pryds, Anne Thayer. Textes et études du Moyen Age, 5. Louvain-la-Neuve: F.I.D.E.M., 1996.
- Bernard of Clairvaux, Sermons for the Summer Season: Liturgical Sermons from Rogationtide and Pentecost, CF 53, translation, introduction, notes, and indexes. Kalamazoo, Mich.: Cistercian Publications, 1991.
- De Ore Domini: Preacher and Word in the Middle Ages, with Thomas L. Amos and Eugene A. Green. Kalamazoo, Mich.: Medieval Institute Publications, 1989.
- Panoramas literarios: España. Literary anthology, with Teresa Méndez-Faith. Houghton Mifflin, 1997. 2nd ed. with Mary Anne Vetterling and Teresa Méndez-Faith, Cengage Learning, 2012.
