= Morgan Matthews (filmmaker) =

English documentary director

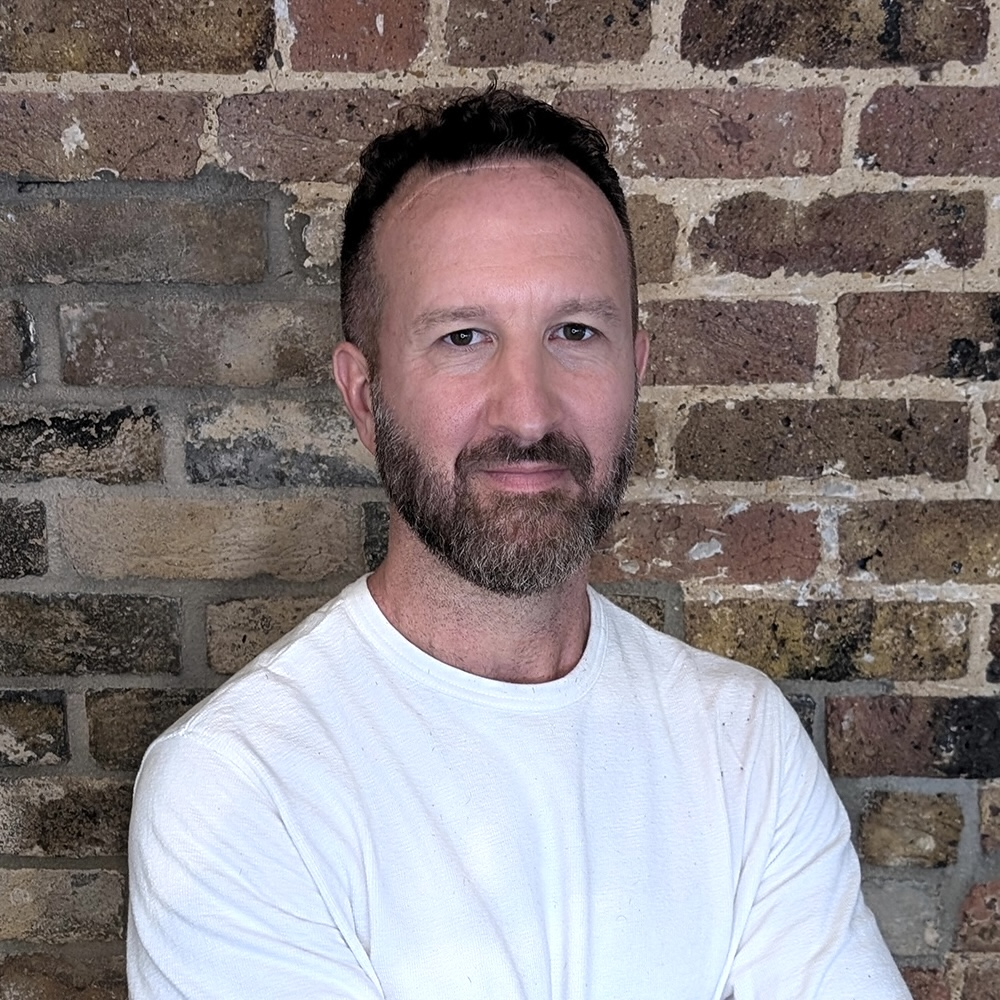
- Matthews in 2022
- Born: United Kingdom
- Occupation: Film director

Morgan Matthews is a four x BAFTA-winning director & executive producer and the founder of independent production company Minnow Films.

Morgan Matthews initially established a distinctive style directing documentaries, and then later with scripted drama, following his critically acclaimed feature film debut X+Y in 2014. Written by James Graham and starring Asa Butterfield, Rafe Spall, Eddie Marsan and Sally Hawkins, X+Y premiered at the Toronto Film Festival and went on to garner many international awards and nominations. The film was loosely based on Morgan’s BAFTA, RTS and Grierson nominated documentary Beautiful Young Minds, about a team of young mathematics prodigies.

Morgan’s past directing credits include The Fallen, a 3-hour single documentary chronicling every British serviceperson killed in the Afghanistan and Iraq wars. The Fallen was named best single documentary at the 2008 RTS Awards, also winning two BAFTAs including Best Factual Director. In 2009, Morgan directed Scenes from a Teenage Killing, documenting every teenager who died as a result of violence in a single year in the UK. The film premiered at the Sheffield Documentary Festival, winning the audience award, and was also BAFTA-nominated for best single documentary. In 2012, Morgan teamed up with executive producers Ridley Scott and Kevin Macdonald, directing the BAFTA-nominated Britain in a Day, representing a single day in the life of people in the UK. In 2017, Morgan directed the BBC Films feature documentary Williams, telling the story of the last family run Formula One team. Williams was released theatrically after being nominated for two BIFAS including Best Documentary. In 2023 Morgan directed the feature film The Railway Children Return, a sequel to The Railway Children. the film was written by Danny Brocklehurst and starred Jenny Agutter, Tom Courtenay and Sheridan Smith. Morgan’s third scripted feature film, 500 Miles, written by Malcolm Campbell and starring Bill Nighy, Maisie Williams, Clare Dunne, Michael Socha and Roman Griffin Davis, was released in 2026.

In his role as founder of independent production company Minnow Films, Morgan has also executive produced numerous documentaries, including the 7/7: One Day in London, War in the Blood, Grenfell, The Last Survivors, and Atomic People.
