= San Francisco Bay Area Film Critics Circle Award for Best Actress =

Annual US film award

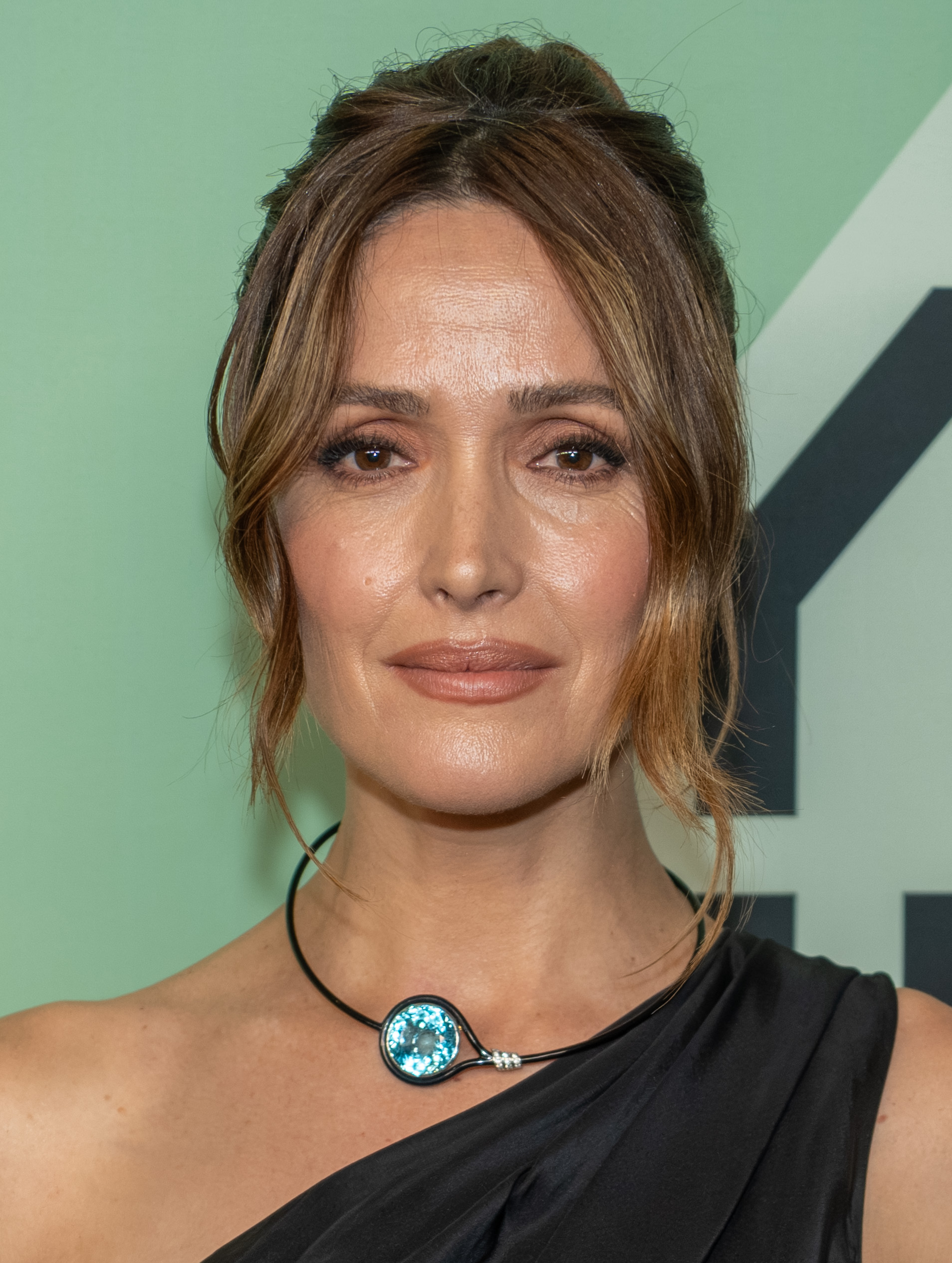
- The 2025 recipient: Rose Byrne
- Awarded for: Best Performance by an Actress in a Leading Role
- Country: United States
- Presented by: San Francisco Bay Area Film Critics Circle
- First award: Isabelle Huppert; The Piano Teacher (2002)
- Currently held by: Rose Byrne; If I Had Legs I'd Kick You (2025)
- Website: sfbafcc.com

The San Francisco Bay Area Film Critics Circle Award for Best Actress is an award given by the San Francisco Bay Area Film Critics Circle to honor an actress who has delivered an outstanding performance in a leading role.

== Winners ==
=== 2000s ===
Year	Winner	Film	Role
2002	Isabelle Huppert	The Piano Teacher (La pianiste)	Erika Kohut
2003	Charlize Theron	Monster	Aileen Wuornos
2004	Julie Delpy	Before Sunset	Céline
2005	Reese Witherspoon	Walk the Line	June Carter Cash
2006	Helen Mirren	The Queen	Queen Elizabeth II
2007	Julie Christie	Away from Her	Fiona Anderson
2008	Sally Hawkins	Happy-Go-Lucky	Pauline "Poppy" Cross
2009	Meryl Streep	Julie & Julia	Julia Child

=== 2010s ===
Year	Winner	Film	Role
2010	Michelle Williams	Blue Valentine	Cindy Heller
2011	Tilda Swinton	We Need to Talk About Kevin	Eva Khatchadourian
2012	Emmanuelle Riva	Amour	Anne Laurent
2013	Cate Blanchett	Blue Jasmine	Jeanette "Jasmine" Francis
2014	Julianne Moore	Still Alice	Dr. Alice Howland
2015	Saoirse Ronan	Brooklyn	Eilis Lacey
2016	Isabelle Huppert	Elle	Michèle Leblanc
2017	Margot Robbie	I, Tonya	Tonya Harding
2018	Melissa McCarthy	Can You Ever Forgive Me?	Lee Israel
2019	Lupita Nyong'o	Us	Adelaide Wilson / Red

=== 2020s ===
Year	Winner	Film	Role
2020	Frances McDormand	Nomadland	Fern
2021	Olivia Colman	The Lost Daughter	Leda
2022	Cate Blanchett	Tár	Lydia Tár
2023	Emma Stone	Poor Things	Bella Baxter
2024	Marianne Jean-Baptiste	Hard Truths	Pansey Deacon
2025	Rose Byrne	If I Had Legs I'd Kick You	Linda

== Multiple awards ==
2 awards

- Cate Blanchett (2013, 2022)
- Isabelle Huppert (2002, 2016)
