= Helen Barr =

English academic

Professor Helen Barr
- Born: 1961 (age 64–65)

Academic background
- Education: Lady Margaret Hall, Oxford
- Thesis: A study of Mum and the sothsegger in its political and literary contexts (1989)

Academic work
- Discipline: English literature
- Sub-discipline: Middle English literature; Geoffrey Chaucer
- Institutions: University of Sussex; Lady Margaret Hall, Oxford

Helen Barr (born 1961) is an academic specialising in English literature on the late medieval period. She has spent her entire career at the University of Oxford, and, in 2016, the university awarded her the title of Professor of English Literature.

== Career ==
Barr completed her Bachelor of Arts, Master of Philosophy and Doctor of Philosophy degrees at Lady Margaret Hall, Oxford. In 1995, she was elected a fellow at LMH and appointed a university lecturer in English. Her appointment was made permanent until retirement age in 2000. Barr has also taught at the University of Sussex and, as of 2017, is vice-principal of LMH. In 2016, the University of Oxford awarded her the title of Professor of English Literature.

== Research ==
Barr research focuses on English literature in the late medieval period, and she has published books on Geoffrey Chaucer's influence on visual and literary culture. She has also researched the literary geography of Kent and Leicester. Her published works include:

- The Piers Plowman Tradition: A Critical Edition of Pierce the Ploughman’s Crede, Richard the Redeless, Mum and the Sothsegger, and The Crowned King (London: Everyman, 1993).
- Signes and Sothe: Language in the Piers Plowman Tradition (Cambridge: Boydell and Brewer, 1994).
- Socioliterary Practice in Late Medieval England (Oxford: Oxford University Press, 2001).
- (edited with Ann M. Hutchison) Text and Controversy from Wyclif to Bale: Essays In Honour of Anne Hudson (Turnhout: Brepols, 2005).
- The Digby Poems: A New Edition of the Lyrics (Exeter: University of Exeter Press, 2009).
- "The 'Pearl-Poet'", in The Bible in English Literature, ed. Rebecca Lemon et al. (Oxford: Wiley-Blackwell, 2009).
- "Contemporary Events", in A Concise Companion to Middle English Literature, ed. Marilyn Corrie (Oxford: Wiley-Blackwell, 2009).
- "Religious Practice in Chaucer's Prioresse's Tale: Rabbit and/or Duck?", Studies in the Age of Chaucer, vol. 32 (2010), 39–66.
- "Wrinkled Deep in Time: Emily and Arcite in A Midsummer Night's Dream", Shakespeare Survey, vol. 65 (2012), 12–25.
- "Major episodes and moments in Piers Plowman B", in The Cambridge Companion to Piers Plowman, eds., Andrew Cole and Andrew Galloway (Cambridge: Cambridge University Press, 2014), pp. 15–32.
- Transporting Chaucer (Manchester: Manchester University Press, 2014).
- "Leicester", in Europe: A Literary History, ed. David Wallace (Oxford: Oxford University Press, 2016), pp. 285–297.
