= Boydell & Brewer =

British publisher

- Status: Active
- Founded: 1978; 48 years ago
- Founder: Richard Barber, Derek Brewer
- Country of origin: England
- Headquarters location: Martlesham, Suffolk
- Distribution: John Wiley & Sons (UK, EMEA, and the Far East); Ingram Content Group (US & Canada)
- Nonfiction topics: African studies; Early modern history; German studies; Hispanic & lusophone studies; Literature; Maritime history; Medieval history; Musicology
- Imprints: Boydell Press; D. S. Brewer; Camden House; Tamesis Books; James Clarke; Lutterworth Press; University of Rochester Press; James Currey; York Medieval Press; Durham University IMEMS Press; Koryu Press
- Official website: boydellandbrewer.com

Boydell & Brewer is an independent academic press based in Martlesham, Suffolk, England, that specializes in publishing humanities and social science research.

The company is especially strong in Medieval studies, publishing more than 50 monograph series on topics from the history of warfare to Arthurian romances. They partner with departments at the University of York and Durham University on dedicated medieval studies series. Other partners in medieval studies include The Royal Armouries at Leeds.

The press publishes in musicology and music theory under the Boydell Press and University of Rochester Press imprints, notably through the series Eastman Studies in Music, edited by scholars from the renowned Eastman School of Music at the University of Rochester.

Imprints include Camden House (German studies and American literature), Tamesis Books (Hispanic and lusophone studies), and James Currey (African studies). Since 1989, the company has partnered with the University of Rochester in New York state on the imprint University of Rochester Press.

The company was co-founded by historians Richard Barber and Derek Brewer in 1978, merging the two companies Boydell Press and D. S. Brewer which they had respectively founded.

In 2015, ownership of the company was transferred to an Employee ownership trust to secure its independence for the long term.

In addition to the company's primary imprints and partners – Camden House, University of Rochester Press, James Currey, Tamesis, James Clarke and Lutterworth Press – Boydell & Brewer publish and distribute for the Victoria County History, the Royal Historical Society, the London Record Society, and the Scottish Text Society, as well as several other societies.
