= Jacqui Hawkins =

English author and illustrator

- Born: Jacqueline M. Hawkins
- Occupations: Author; illustrator
- Spouse: Colin Hawkins (m. 1968)
- Children: 2, including Sally Hawkins

Jacqueline M. Hawkins is an English book author and illustrator. She formed a creative partnership with her husband Colin Hawkins, with whom she has illustrated and written over 150 children's books. They are the parents of actress Sally Hawkins.

== Career ==
The Hawkins' created The Numberlies book series, for children learning to count; and the Foxy book series, featuring the adventures of Foxy the Fox. The Foxy series was adapted into a cartoon series for television in the 1990s; there are also interactive mobile apps for some of their books.

== Select works ==
- Witches (1981)
- Adding Animals (1983)
- Pat the Cat (1983)
- Mig the Pig (1984)
- Jen the Hen (1985)
- Tog the Dog (1986)
- Zug the Bug (1988)
- Terrible, Terrible, Tiger (1987)
- The Wizard's Cat (1987)
- I'm Not Sleepy (1985)
- One, Two, Guess Who? (2001)
- Crocodile Creek (1988)
- Noah Built an Ark One Day (1989)
- Mr. Bear's Plane (1989)
- When I Was One (1990)
- The House that Jack Built (1990)
- Knock! Knock! (1990)
- Cosmic Cat and the Pink Planet (1988)
- Cosmic Cat and the Space Spider (1988)
- Foxy and the Spots (1995)
- Foxy Goes to Bed (1995)
- Foxy in the Kitchen (1995)
- Foxy Loses His Tail (1995)
- Foxy Plays Hide and Seek (1995)
- Foxy and His Naughty Little Sister (1997)
- Foxy and Friends Go Racing (1998)
- Foxy Bakes Some Cakes (1998)
- Foxy Feels Unwell (2001)
- What's the Time, Mr. Wolf? (1983)
- Mr. Wolf's Week (1985)
- Mr. Wolf's Birthday Surprise (1987)
- Mr. Wolf's Sticker Ticker Time (1997)
- Mr. Wolf's Nursery Time (2005)
- Greedy Goat (1999)
- Daft Dog (1999)
- Crazy Cow (2000)
- Rude Rabbit (2000)
- Bad Bear (2001)
- Happy Horse (2001)
- Hungry Baby (2003)
- Playful Baby (2004)
- Sleepy Baby (2004)
- Soapy Baby (2004)
- Bruno and the New Plane (2003)
- Bruno and the Old Car (2003)
- Pirates Joke Book (2001)
- Vampires Joke Book (2001)
- Aliens Joke Book (2001)
- Pirate's Log: The Diary of Captain Ben Blunder (2001)
- Alien Diaries: Zorb Zork (2001)
- How to Look After Your Hamster (1995)
- How to Look After Your Cat (1982)
- How to Look After Your Rabbit (1995)
- How to Look After Your Dog (1991)
- Here's a Happy Pig (1988)
- Here's a Happy Elephant (1987)
- Here's a Happy Kitten (1996)
- Here's a Happy Puppy (1996)
- The Monsters Go on a Picnic (1984)
- The Monsters Visit Granny (1984)

== Personal life ==
She is married to Colin Hawkins. They have two children, actress Sally Hawkins, and Finbar Hawkins, a producer.
