= Fingersmith (TV serial) =

- Promotional picture for Fingersmith
- Based on: Fingersmith by Sarah Waters
- Written by: Peter Ransley
- Directed by: Aisling Walsh
- Starring: Sally Hawkins; Imelda Staunton; Elaine Cassidy; Rupert Evans; Charles Dance
- Country of origin: United Kingdom
- Original language: English
- No. of episodes: 3

Production
- Running time: 60 minutes

Original release
- Network: BBC One
- Release: 27 March – 10 April 2005

Fingersmith is a three-part BBC mini-series that was televised in 2005.

The story is an adaptation of Sarah Waters' 2002 novel of the same name and follows a con man who plans to seduce and defraud a wealthy heiress with the help of a young orphaned woman. Directed by Aisling Walsh, it stars Sally Hawkins, Imelda Staunton, Elaine Cassidy, Rupert Evans and Charles Dance.

The mini-series was nominated for Best Drama Serial at the 2006 British Academy Television Awards. The series was re-edited from three 60-minute episodes into two 90-minute episodes for release on DVD and international syndication.

== Plot ==
Since she was orphaned, Sue Trinder (Sally Hawkins) has been brought up amongst thieves and charlatans. She has been protected and cared for by Mrs. Sucksby (Imelda Staunton) and taught to become a fingersmith (a pickpocket). But when Mrs. Sucksby's old friend Richard Rivers (Rupert Evans), known as Gentleman, offers 20-year-old Sue £2,000 to assist him in one of his scams, she cannot resist.

Passing himself off as a proper gent, Rivers has befriended a young lady, Maud Lilly (Elaine Cassidy), who stands to inherit a fortune when she marries. However, Maud's maid has recently left her service and, without a chaperone, Rivers' access to Maud is limited. He wants Sue to be accepted as the new maid and to help him win Maud over. Once married, Rivers plans to have Maud committed to an asylum and he will then take her fortune for himself.

Arriving at Briar, the estate where Maud lives with her wealthy bookish Uncle Lilly (Charles Dance), Sue enters another world. Maud and Sue are of a similar age and appearance but their experience of life could not be further apart. Maud's existence is one of wealth and prosperity inside a grand house, where she is her uncle's secretary and also has the duty of reading to her uncle and his friends. Over the course of a few months, Sue and Maud become friends and, briefly, lovers. Despite Sue's growing feelings for Maud, she is convinced to proceed with Rivers' scam. On Sue's advice, Maud accepts Rivers' proposal of marriage as a way of gaining her freedom from her uncle.

Once married to Maud, Rivers' next plan is to get her admitted to the asylum. But in a dramatic twist, Sue is taken to the madhouse as "Mrs Rivers" and she realises that Maud has been in on the plan from the very beginning.

Having disposed of Sue, Rivers takes Maud to London to Mrs. Sucksby's house. There Maud learns that Mrs. Sucksby is the mastermind behind her escape and Sue's downfall. Maud is plagued by doubts over her treatment of Sue and the fake life that she presented.

In reality, Maud was orphaned and brought up by her uncle, a cruel man, who hardened her heart. The nightly readings in his library were not as innocent as it appeared to Sue. Maud was forced to read pornography to her uncle and his friends. Tormented by the cruelty of her existence, Maud found in Rivers a way out.

By marrying him, she could escape the prison of her uncle's house. But what Maud had not expected was to be so affected by her friendship with Sue – or indeed that she would fall in love with her. In order to save herself from her uncle, Maud had to reconcile herself to hurting Sue.

But even Maud could not have imagined that her world would be further turned upside down. Mrs. Sucksby reveals that through a series of twists and turns Maud and Sue were switched at birth – they have been living each other's lives. Mrs. Sucksby arranged the whole scheme. Marianne Lilly, before being incarcerated in the asylum by her evil brother, changed her will, leaving one half of her wealth to her own daughter, Susan, and the other half to Maud.

Mrs. Sucksby explains to Maud that she has no choice but to comply with the rest of the plan. Maud is further devastated to learn that they have no intention of rescuing Sue from the asylum.

Acknowledging the wrong she has done, Maud knows she must escape Mrs. Sucksby if she is to rescue Sue. She manages to get out and finds her way to an old business associate of her uncle's, but he refuses to help and sends her away. Alone in the alleyways and streets of London and unaware of the dangers that lurk, Maud realises she has no choice but to return to Lant Street. Mrs. Sucksby is overjoyed to see her and Maud discovers that she is in fact Mrs. Sucksby's own daughter.

Meanwhile, employing all the underhanded tricks that her childhood has taught her, Sue escapes from the asylum. She heads for London where she plans to get her revenge on Maud for what she sees as betrayal.

At Mrs. Sucksby's, Sue confronts Maud, Mrs. Sucksby and Rivers; a huge row ensues and in a struggle Rivers is killed. Despite Maud being guilty of Rivers' murder, Mrs. Sucksby confesses to protect both girls and soon after is executed for the crime.

Maud disappears and Sue, realising that Maud was just an innocent in Mrs. Sucksby's scheme, sets off to find her. Acknowledging their feelings for one another, the two women are reunited.

== Cast ==
- Sally Hawkins as Sue Trinder
- Elaine Cassidy as Maud Lilly
- Imelda Staunton as Mrs. Sucksby
- Rupert Evans as Richard 'Gentleman' Rivers
- Charles Dance as Uncle Lilly
- David Troughton as Mr. Ibbs
- Bronson Webb as John Vroom
- Stephen Wight as Charles
- Michelle Dockery as Betty
- Richard Durden as Mr. Hawtrey
- Polly Hemingway as Mrs. Stiles
- Sarah Badel as Mrs. Frobisher
- Sarah Waters as a maid
- Ian Midlane as a warder

== See also ==
- The Handmaiden, a 2016 South Korean film inspired by the same novel.
