= Daniel Lightwing =

Former child prodigy

- Born: 1988 (age 37–38); Chesterfield, Derbyshire, England
- Education: Studied Natural Language Processing, Peking University (2009–2011); MA Mathematics, University of Cambridge (2006–2009); MA Oriental Studies University of Cambridge (2008–2009)
- Occupation: Co-founder of Castella Research
- Years active: 2006–present
- Known for: Silver medalist at the 2006 International Mathematical Olympiad, former child prodigy
- Notable work: Beautiful Young Minds (2007); X+Y (2014)

Daniel James Lightwing is a former mathematics child prodigy and co-founder of the London-based Internet/gambling business Castella Research, which uses high-frequency trading inspired methods to place bets on sports exchanges. He was previously a web backend developer for the London offices of Google. In 2006, he represented the United Kingdom at the International Mathematical Olympiad (IMO) in Ljubljana, Slovenia, where he won a silver medal. His experience at the IMO was described in the 2007 BBC Two British television documentary Beautiful Young Minds and the 2014 film X+Y.

Lightwing started to gain more fame in China from 2016, particularly on the website Zhihu, where his articles written in Chinese, covering a broad range of topics had attracted more than 170,000 followers within one year.

== Early life and education ==
Lightwing was born in 1988 in Chesterfield, Derbyshire to David S. B. Lightwing and his wife, Carolyn J. née Davidson. He grew up in the Lake District, and Warthill, Yorkshire. In 2015, he described that, before the age of nine, he "had no particular attraction to mathematics. I learnt to read very young, before attending primary school. And I did read all kinds of things—books aimed at children 5–10 years older. At primary school, I read the entire library."

As his education developed, his teachers "were a little perplexed what to do with me". He described how he was not learning anything he had not already learned and was bullied by one of his teachers who expected him to "sit under her desk and be ridiculed" for no apparent reason. The bullying increased after he "got extremely angry and jumped on top of the desk to denounce her".

After some intensive personal instruction within a special "one-to-one" mathematics class with another teacher, he learned that he enjoyed those classes, and stated that, "before long, I had made my mind up that maths was what I wanted to do." He went through many gifted and talented programmes throughout his childhood.

At home, his mother, who was a maths and science teacher, had researched Asperger syndrome (AS) when he was 16 years of age after reading the 2003 mystery novel The Curious Incident of the Dog in the Night-Time, and, later, took him to a diagnostic consultation with University of Cambridge autism researcher and professor Simon Baron-Cohen, who diagnosed AS. Parts of the consultation were included in the 2007 BBC Two British television documentary Beautiful Young Minds.

His interest in mathematics led him to being recruited as a member of the 2006 International Mathematical Olympiad (IMO) team, where he represented the United Kingdom and won a silver medal in Ljubljana, Slovenia.

He was the subject of Catalyst, an Australian television programme, in 2008, as well as several Chinese television productions.

He attended Trinity College, Cambridge, where he received a Master of Arts degree in mathematics in 2009, as well as Peking University, where he studied computational linguistics. He previously attended York College and St Peter's School, a public school in York.

Lightwing has stated that he has a positive view of autism.

"I wouldn't call it a disability. When you have Asperger's you are putting on a mask and trying to pretend you are normal but what you are thinking is not normal."

== Films ==
Lightwing's life story was presented in two films. In 2007, the British television documentary Beautiful Young Minds was broadcast by BBC Two, and described his medal-winning competition at the 2006 International Mathematical Olympiad (IMO), as well as his connections with China. In 2014, the film X+Y, starring Asa Butterfield as Nathan Ellis, a character based on Lightwing, was released and portrayed Lightwing's experiences before and during the IMO competition.

== Career ==
Lightwing's professional career includes working at Google, and several gambling-related firms, before co-founding the London-based business Castella Research. He was previously a developer for the London offices of Google, and was once recruited part-time as an IT and marketing manager for the Chinese company Greenland Group. He is fluent in Mandarin and Cantonese.

His time with Google changed his opinion about workplace socialising. In 2015, he admitted that he had "a problem with office culture", adding that he sometimes wants "to join in with other people", but is too shy, and does not know what to say when it is not work-related.
