= X+Y =

2014 film directed by Morgan Matthews

- British film poster
- Directed by: Morgan Matthews
- Written by: James Graham
- Produced by: David M. Thompson; Laura Hastings-Smith
- Starring: Asa Butterfield; Rafe Spall; Sally Hawkins; Eddie Marsan; Jo Yang
- Cinematography: Danny Cohen
- Edited by: Peter Lambert
- Music by: Martin Phipps
- Production companies: BBC Films; British Film Institute; Head Gear Films; Metrol Technology; Screen Yorkshire; Lipsync Productions; Origin Pictures; Minnow Films; Pinnacle Films
- Distributed by: Koch Media
- Release dates: 5 September 2014 (TIFF); 13 March 2015 (United Kingdom)
- Running time: 111 minutes
- Country: United Kingdom
- Language: English
- Box office: $1.2 million

X+Y, released in the US as A Brilliant Young Mind, is a 2014 British drama film directed by Morgan Matthews and starring Asa Butterfield, Rafe Spall, and Sally Hawkins.

The film, inspired by the 2007 documentary Beautiful Young Minds, focuses on a teenage English mathematics prodigy named Nathan (Asa Butterfield) who has difficulty understanding people, and is autistic, but finds comfort in numbers. When he is chosen to represent the United Kingdom at the International Mathematical Olympiad (IMO), Nathan embarks on a journey in which he faces unexpected challenges, such as understanding the nature of love. The character of Nathan was based on Daniel Lightwing, who won a silver medal at the 2006 IMO.

The film premiered at the Toronto International Film Festival on 5 September 2014. The European premiere was at the BFI London Film Festival on 13 October 2014, and the UK cinema release was on 13 March 2015.

== Plot ==
Nathan Ellis, a 9-year-old maths prodigy, has just lost his father in a car accident. Nathan is diagnosed as being on the autism spectrum early in the film, and his father was the only one who was able to connect normally with him. Although Nathan values his mother, Julie, he shuns any physical contact with her and treats her as more of a caregiver than a parent. Wanting to make sure Nathan is not distracted from his studies, Julie enrolls him in advanced classes at a new school (filmed at High Storrs School in Sheffield, United Kingdom). There, he comes under the tutelage of teacher Martin Humphreys, also a maths genius, who has multiple sclerosis. Martin sees himself in Nathan, once a promising young mind in the field of mathematics, who gave it all up once he was diagnosed with his illness.

Seven years later, Martin is preparing Nathan to compete for a place in the International Mathematical Olympiad, a prestigious high school competition consisting of the world's best young mathematicians. This year, it is to be held at Cambridge after a two-week maths camp in Taiwan where the students will study for the test that determines the winners. Nathan fears he is not good enough to qualify but ends up doing well enough to accompany 15 other British teenagers to Taiwan.

Suddenly thrust out of his comfort zone, Nathan finds himself no longer the smartest maths whiz in the room, and his social anxieties nearly paralyse his performance. He has trouble reading the social cues of others and flinches at the slightest physical contact with another person. Nathan is paired with a female Chinese student, Zhang Mei, who slowly helps him adjust to his new surroundings and helps him fight through his fears. By the skin of their teeth, Nathan and Zhang make the cut to compete in Cambridge.

Back in England, Zhang stays with Nathan and his mother, who is shocked to find that his behaviour has transformed into something more normal. She becomes aware that he may have feelings for Zhang, which she asks him. Not fully understanding the concept of love, Nathan is unsure how to express his feelings. He keeps his emotions bottled up as they all travel to Cambridge and settle in for the Olympiad.

Things quickly unravel when Zhang's uncle catches her in Nathan's room one morning. This causes Zhang to withdraw from the competition and leave. Nathan, who now believes he loves Zhang, is torn between her and the Olympiad. When he sits down among hundreds of other students around the world for the exam, the first question triggers memories of his dead father, which combined with his newly lost love, creates an emotional overload. At the pinnacle moment of his mathematical career, Nathan must make a decision whether to stay and pursue his dream, or give in to the pain that has haunted him for most of his life.

Nathan rushes out of the exam hall with Martin and Julie in tow. The latter finds him in a café, where he speaks of his emotional overload, both from the loss of his father and the girl who appreciated and loved him, Zhang Mei. They embrace at last, then Julie drives Nathan to the station to fetch back Zhang Mei.

== Cast ==
- Asa Butterfield as Nathan Ellis
  - Edward Baker-Close as Nathan Ellis (age 9)
- Rafe Spall as Martin Humphreys
- Sally Hawkins as Julie Ellis
- Eddie Marsan as Richard
- Jo Yang as Zhang Mei
- Jake Davies as Luke Shelton
- Alexa Davies as Rebecca
- Martin McCann as Michael Ellis
- Alex Lawther as Isaac Cooper

== Reception ==
The review aggregator website Rotten Tomatoes reports an 87% approval rating with a weighted average score of 6.58/10 based on 75 reviews. The website's consensus reads, "A Brilliant Young Mind is tender and perceptive – and intelligent enough to find a wealth of dramatic riches buried under well-trod narrative ground." On Metacritic, the film has a score of 65 out of 100 based on 19 critics, indicating "generally favorable reviews". By contrast, Godfrey Cheshire, writing for RogerEbert.com, gave the film one and a half out of four stars, calling it "TV-style triteness and warmed-over clichés" with a "cliché-clotted script". He criticized the lack of character development, noting that "with one exception, Nathan's relationships with people go nowhere", and found that Sally Hawkins and Asa Butterfield were "reduced to one-note performances due to the limitations of their characters as written".

== Departures from the true story ==
The main character Nathan Ellis is based on mathematical genius Daniel Lightwing, who is autistic. Lightwing had a teacher who saw his potential and became his mentor; however, his mentor was not a man, but a woman named Miggy Biller, who is the Head of Maths at York College. Lightwing never lost his father; in fact, his father also attended with him at the film premier. In the film, the IMO is at its 59th edition (corresponding to 2018) and takes place in Cambridge, England, but the actual event that Lightwing participated in was the 47th edition (2006), hosted in Slovenia. Moreover, the real-world 59th IMO, which happened four years after the release of the film, took place in Romania, and the following edition coincidentally took place in England. The training camp took place in China, where Daniel fell in love with a Chinese woman named Zhu Yan, whom he went on to marry (they are no longer together).

Biller attended the film's premiere and told the York College newsletter: "We sat beside each other at the showing, chuckling together about some of the film's maths problems. It was funny to look at the line between fact and fiction being trod all the time by the film! Dan's Dad, sitting just behind us, saw himself killed in a car accident … and I don't think I need to say that I didn't recognise myself in Rafe Spall!" She went on to say, "It's a brilliant and very moving film, and Asa Butterfield is amazing." Lightwing told the Evening Standard, "I cried the first three times I watched it. It says things I was feeling but could not express."

== See also ==
- List of films about mathematicians
