= Sally Hawkins =

British actress (born 1976)

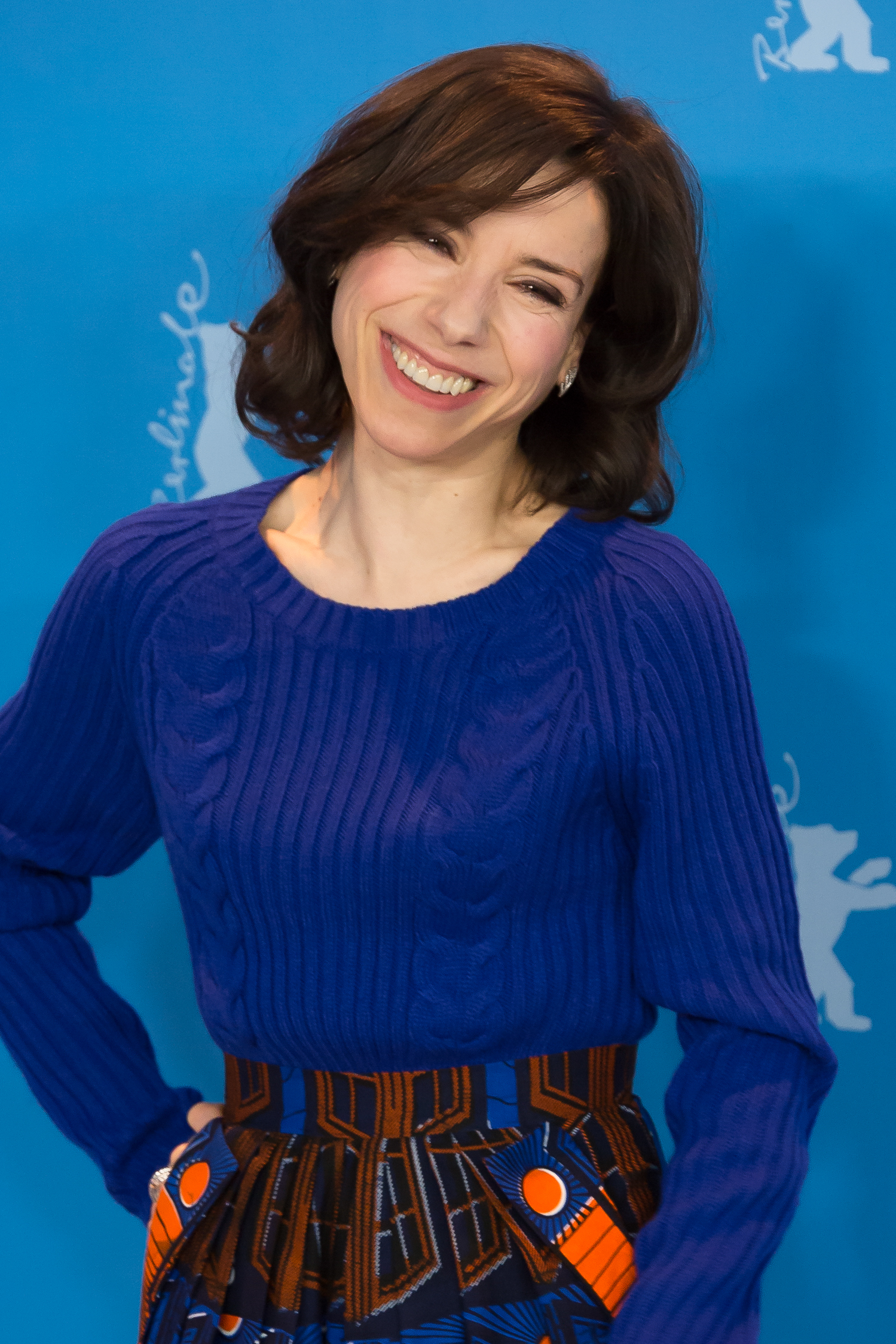
- Hawkins at the 2017 Berlin International Film Festival
- Born: Sally Cecilia Hawkins; 27 April 1976 (age 50); Lewisham, London, England
- Education: Royal Academy of Dramatic Art (RADA)
- Occupation: Actress
- Years active: 1998–present
- Works: Full list
- Parent: Jacqui Hawkins
- Awards: Full list

Sally Cecilia Hawkins (born 27 April 1976) is an English actress of stage and screen. She began her career on stage and then moved into film, for which she has received several accolades.

After graduating from the Royal Academy of Dramatic Art, she started her career as a stage actress in Shakespeare productions Romeo and Juliet (playing Juliet), Much Ado About Nothing, and A Midsummer Night's Dream. Her first major role was in Mike Leigh's All or Nothing (2002). She continued working with Leigh, appearing in a supporting role in Vera Drake (2004) and taking the lead in Happy-Go-Lucky (2008), for which she won several awards, including the Golden Globe Award for Best Actress in a Motion Picture – Musical or Comedy and the Silver Bear for Best Actress.

Hawkins appeared in two Woody Allen films, Cassandra's Dream (2007) and Blue Jasmine (2013); for the latter, she received a nomination for the Academy Award for Best Supporting Actress. She went on to play lead roles in Made in Dagenham (2010), Paddington (2014), Maudie (2016), Paddington 2 (2017), and Bring Her Back (2025), and also appeared in Submarine (2010), Godzilla (2014), Spencer (2021), and Wonka (2023). For starring as Elisa Esposito, a mute cleaning woman in the period romantic dark fantasy film The Shape of Water (2017), she earned critical acclaim and was nominated for the Academy Award for Best Actress.

In 2010, she made her Broadway debut in Mrs. Warren's Profession and in 2012 she starred in Constellations at the Royal Court Theatre, which later moved to the Duke of York's Theatre in the West End. On television, she appeared in the BBC adaptations of Tipping the Velvet (2002) as Zena Blake, and Fingersmith (2005) as Sue Trinder. She also appeared as Anne Elliot in Persuasion (2007), ITV's adaptation of Jane Austen's novel.

== Early life ==
Sally Cecilia Hawkins was born in Lewisham, London, on 27 April 1976, the daughter of Jacqui Hawkins and Colin Hawkins, both authors and illustrators of children's books. Her parents both have Irish ancestry. She has a brother, Finbar, a television and film producer with Aardman Animations, who also writes children's books.

Hawkins grew up in Blackheath in a National Trust-protected gingerbread house designed by Patrick Gwynne. She developed an interest in acting at the age of three when she went to a circus show. She intended to go into comedy but ended up doing theatre plays. She attended James Allen's Girls' School in Dulwich, South London.

Hawkins attended the Royal Academy of Dramatic Art (RADA). In 1998, while still a student, she was cast as an extra in Star Wars: Episode I – The Phantom Menace (1999). She graduated from RADA in 1998 with an Acting (RADA Diploma).

== Career ==
=== Early stage career ===
Hawkins started her career primarily as a stage actress in such productions as Accidental Death of an Anarchist, Romeo and Juliet, The Cherry Orchard (at York Theatre Royal,), Much Ado About Nothing, A Midsummer Night's Dream (both at Regents Park Theatre), and Misconceptions (at Octagon). She also appeared in Svejk (at The Gate Theatre, Dublin), The Whore Of Babylon (at Globe Ed. Centre) and As You Like It for The Buckingham Palace Gala. She also appeared in Casualty (1999), and in Doctors (2000).

=== 2000s ===
In 2002, Hawkins played Samantha in Mike Leigh's film All or Nothing. It was the first of three films Hawkins and Leigh worked on together, the second of which was the 2004 film Vera Drake. She appeared as Slasher in the 2004 action film Layer Cake. Her first major television role came in 2005, when she played Susan Trinder in Fingersmith, an adaptation of Sarah Waters' novel of the same name, in which she co-starred with Imelda Staunton. She then starred in another BBC adaptation, Patrick Hamilton's Twenty Thousand Streets Under the Sky. Between 2003 and 2005 she appeared in four episodes of the BBC comedy series Little Britain. She acted in David Hare's adaptation of Federico García Lorca's play The House of Bernarda Alba in 2005, at Royal National Theatre.

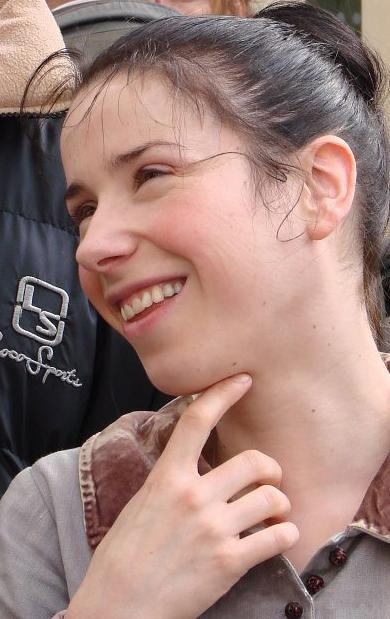
Hawkins on the set of Persuasion in 2006

She has also lent her voice to numerous radio series such as Concrete Cow, on which she also was a writer, Ed Reardon's Week, War with the Newts, and Think the Unthinkable.

In 2006, Hawkins returned to the stage, appearing at the Royal Court Theatre in Jez Butterworth's The Winterling. During 2006, she also made uncredited appearances in Richard Ayoade's Man to Man with Dean Learner where she played various roles in various deleted scenes included on the series DVD. She was later directed by Ayoade in two of his films, The Double (2013), and Submarine (2010). In 2007, she played Anne Elliot in the television film of Jane Austen's Persuasion. Her performance was well received by critics and was awarded a Golden Nymph. She also starred alongside Colin Farrell and Ewan McGregor in the Woody Allen film Cassandra's Dream (2007).

In 2008, Hawkins had her breakthrough when reunited with Leigh for a third time in the 2008 comedy-drama film Happy-Go-Lucky (2008), portraying Poppy Cross, a kindhearted primary school teacher. Roger Ebert gave the film four out of four stars, praising its humor and depth and Hawkins's acting, stating "[Sally Hawkins] is a joy to behold." Peter Bradshaw wrote in The Guardian that "Sally Hawkins plays [Poppy] superbly", while Tom Long of The Detroit News dubbed her performance "Oscar-worthy". Her performance received many accolades, including winning a Golden Globe Award for Best Actress – Motion Picture Musical or Comedy and Silver Bear for Best Actress.

=== 2010s ===
Three films starring Hawkins, Made in Dagenham, Submarine, and Never Let Me Go, all premiered at the 2010 Toronto International Film Festival. All three received positive reviews and Hawkins's performances were met with critical acclaim. Regarding her performance in Made In Dagenham, Roger Ebert wrote that "[Hawkins] shows an effortless lightness of being" while Xan Brooks of The Guardian remarked that "Hawkins gives a winning performance". In October 2010, she appeared on Broadway as Vivie in Mrs Warren's Profession at the American Airlines Theatre. In 2011 she had a supporting role in the film adaptation of Jane Eyre, and was the female lead in the romantic comedy film Love Birds.

In 2012 she and Rafe Spall costarred in the play Constellations at the Royal Court Theatre and later Duke of York's Theatre. The play was met with positive reviews and won the best play category at the Evening Standard Theatre Awards. She also starred as Mrs Joe in the film Great Expectations (2012).

In 2013 Hawkins starred opposite Cate Blanchett and was directed by Woody Allen for the second time in the critically acclaimed film Blue Jasmine, a role for which she received her first Academy Award nomination for Best Supporting Actress, as well as nods for the BAFTA, the Golden Globe and other accolades. The same year she starred in All Is Bright alongside Paul Giamatti and Paul Rudd and appeared as a receptionist in the Richard Ayoade film The Double. In 2014, she appeared in Godzilla, as Dr Vivienne Graham, a scientist assisting Dr Ishiro Serizawa, played by Ken Watanabe. Godzilla received positive reviews and grossed over $529 million to become Hawkins's most seen film to that point. She reprised the role in 2019's Godzilla: King of the Monsters, which grossed $177 million in its opening weekend and subsequently earned $386 million worldwide, making it one of the highest-grossing films of 2019. She also costarred with John Hawkes and Michael Cera in the Charlie Kaufman television pilot How and Why, which was not picked up. Hawkins portrayed the mother of Asa Butterfield's character in the drama film X+Y, which premiered at the 2014 Toronto International Film Festival.

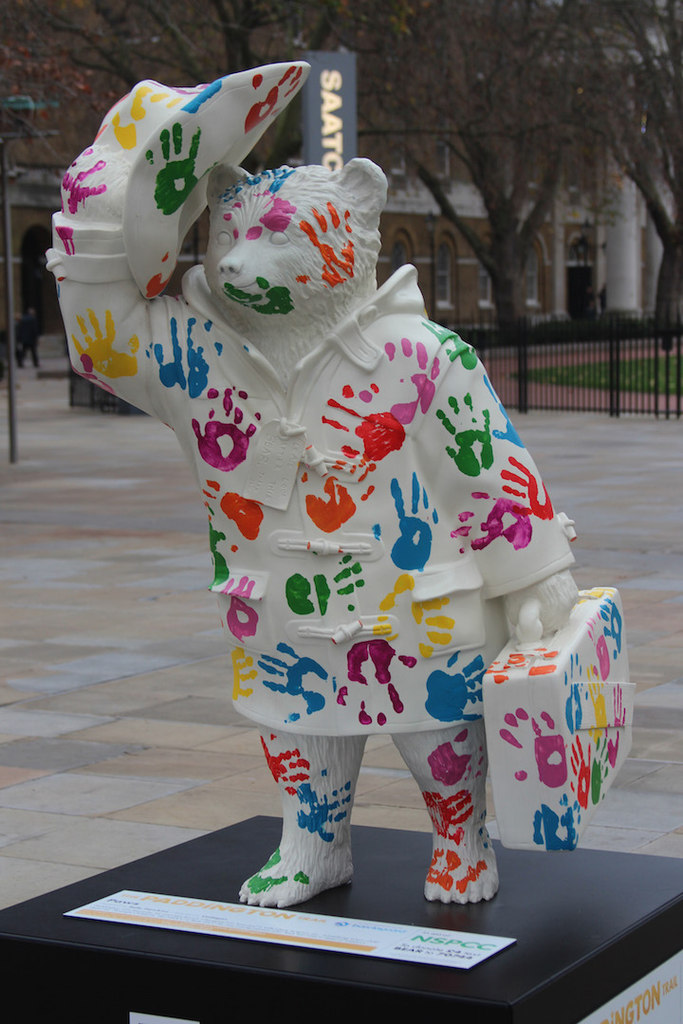
Hawkins' "Paws"-themed Paddington Bear statue in London, auctioned to raise funds for the NSPCC

In November 2014, Hawkins portrayed Mrs Brown in the critically acclaimed film Paddington. The film is based on the children's books by Michael Bond where Paddington, an anthropomorphic bear who migrates from the jungles of Peru to the streets of London, is adopted by the Brown family. Hawkins reprised her role as Mrs Brown for the sequel, Paddington 2 (2017), which also received acclaim.

In 2017, she appeared in the Guillermo del Toro film The Shape of Water, as Elisa Esposito, a mute woman who falls in love with a captured humanoid amphibian creature. She received widespread acclaim for her performance. Matthew Norman of London Evening Standard called it a career defining performance. Mark Kermode of The Guardian called her "sublime", Mihir Fadnavis of Firstpost called it a "winning performance", while Ann Hornaday of The Washington Post stated that "Sally Hawkins delivers a beautiful performance". Hawkins earned nominations for the Academy Award, Golden Globe, BAFTA, and SAG Award for Best Actress. The film itself won Best Picture at the 90th Academy Awards.

=== 2020s ===
In 2022, she starred in The Lost King, a dramatisation of the story of Philippa Langley, the woman who initiated the search to find King Richard III's remains under a car park in Leicester.

In 2023, Hawkins appeared in Wonka, a film which serves as a prequel to the Roald Dahl novel Charlie and the Chocolate Factory, exploring Willy Wonka's origins.

In 2025, Hawkins appeared in Bring Her Back, an Australian supernatural horror film directed by Danny and Michael Philippou.

== Other activities ==
Upon the 2014 release of Paddington, Hawkins designed a "Paws"-themed Paddington Bear statue, which was located outside the Duke of York Square shopping centre (one of 50 placed around London), with the statues auctioned to raise funds for the National Society for the Prevention of Cruelty to Children (NSPCC).

== Acting credits and accolades ==
Hawkins has won many awards, including a Golden Globe Award, in addition to nominations for two Academy Awards and two British Academy Film Awards.

She won several awards for Happy-Go-Lucky (2008), including the Golden Globe Award for Best Actress in a Motion Picture – Musical or Comedy and the Silver Bear for Best Actress. She earned critical acclaim and was nominated for the Academy Award for Best Supporting Actress and the Academy Award for Best Actress respectively for her performances in Blue Jasmine (2013) and The Shape of Water (2017).

== Personal life ==
Hawkins revealed in 2018 that she has lupus, which can make it difficult for her to travel. She is also dyslexic.

== See also ==
- List of British actors
- List of Academy Award winners and nominees from Great Britain
- List of actors with Academy Award nominations
- List of actors with more than one Academy Award nomination in the acting categories
- List of actors nominated for Academy Awards for non-English performances
- List of Golden Globe winners
