= Blue Jasmine =

2013 film by Woody Allen

- Theatrical release poster
- Directed by: Woody Allen
- Written by: Woody Allen
- Produced by: Letty Aronson; Stephen Tenenbaum; Edward Walson
- Starring: Alec Baldwin; Cate Blanchett; Louis C.K.; Bobby Cannavale; Andrew Dice Clay; Sally Hawkins; Peter Sarsgaard; Michael Stuhlbarg
- Cinematography: Javier Aguirresarobe
- Edited by: Alisa Lepselter
- Production companies: Gravier Productions; Perdido Productions
- Distributed by: Sony Pictures Classics
- Release date: July 26, 2013 (United States)
- Running time: 98 minutes
- Country: United States
- Language: English
- Budget: $18 million
- Box office: $99.1 million

Blue Jasmine is a 2013 American black comedy-drama film written and directed by Woody Allen. The film tells the story of a rich Manhattan socialite (Cate Blanchett) who falls on hard times and has to move into her working-class sister's (Sally Hawkins) apartment in San Francisco.

The film received a limited release on July 26, 2013, in New York and Los Angeles, before expanding nationwide on August 23, 2013. It was met with critical acclaim, with praise for Blanchett's and Hawkins' performances and Allen's screenplay. Blanchett won the Academy Award for Best Actress, and Hawkins and Allen were nominated for Best Supporting Actress and Original Screenplay respectively. Blanchett also won the Golden Globe Award, the SAG Award, and the BAFTA Award for Best Actress in a Leading Role. The film was also a box office success, earning $99.1 million worldwide against a budget of $18 million.

== Plot ==
Jeanette "Jasmine" Francis disembarks in San Francisco after a flight from New York City. She takes a taxi to her sister Ginger's apartment, where Ginger is dismayed to learn that Jasmine traveled first class despite claiming to be broke. Jasmine has recently suffered a nervous breakdown and, having incurred heavy debts, has been forced to seek refuge with her sister.

A series of flashbacks reveals that Jasmine's husband, money manager Hal Francis, was arrested for defrauding his clients. Ginger and her husband, Augie, were among Hal's victims; he swindled them out of $200,000 in lottery winnings that Augie had wanted to start a business with, and their marriage fell apart. Hal dies by suicide in prison after being publicly disgraced. Jasmine's stepson Danny subsequently dropped out of Harvard and severed all ties with Jasmine. Following Hal's death, Jasmine began drinking heavily and abusing anti-anxiety medication. She also developed a habit of talking to herself about her past.

Ginger is now dating a mechanic called Chili, whom Jasmine detests for his working class job and coarse manners. Jasmine considers becoming an interior designer because of her "great taste" and past experience in decorating her homes. She wants to take an online course as these are least expensive but having no computer skills, she decides to take a class in computers first. With no income, she grudgingly takes a job as a receptionist with a dentist, who harasses her with unwanted sexual advances. When he assaults her, she fights him off and quits.

Jasmine's situation improves when she meets a wealthy widower, Dwight Westlake, at a party in Marin County north of San Francisco. She attends by invitation of a friend at the computer studies class; her old friends are no longer in contact. Dwight is a diplomat aspiring to become a congressman. She poses as an interior designer, telling him that her husband was a surgeon who died of a heart attack, and adds that she has no children. Dwight is impressed by her stylishness and invites her to decorate his new home. Ginger begins a romance with Al, whom she met at the same party. She breaks up with Chili, who begs her not to leave him. Eventually, she discovers that Al is married and reconciles with Chili, realizing she has been influenced by Jasmine to believe Chili was beneath her.

Jasmine develops a romance with Dwight, and he is about to buy her an engagement ring, when they bump into Augie outside the jewelry store. Augie rails at Jasmine about the money Hal swindled from him. Augie also reveals that Danny is living nearby in Oakland and is now married. Dwight is outraged that Jasmine lied to him and calls off the engagement. Jasmine goes to Oakland and finds Danny, who tells Jasmine he never wants to see her again because of what she did to his father.

It is revealed that Jasmine finally learned of Hal's many affairs and confronted him. When he told her he wanted to divorce her to be with a 19-year-old au pair, Jasmine, rather than divorce him, called the FBI to inform the authorities of Hal's fraudulent business dealings, which led to his arrest.

Jasmine returns to her sister's apartment and finds Ginger back with Chili, who is now moving in. Jasmine and Chili needle each other, and Jasmine is furious when Ginger takes his side. Jasmine says she is going to marry Dwight and is moving out that day. She exits the apartment, walks to a park bench, sits, and begins muttering to herself.

== Cast ==
- Cate Blanchett as Jeanette "Jasmine" Francis, Hal's ex-wife, Danny's stepmother, Ginger's sister, Nora's friend and Dwight's fiancée
- Sally Hawkins as Ginger, Jasmine's sister, Augie's ex-wife and Chili's girlfriend
- Alec Baldwin as Hal Francis, Jasmine's husband and Danny's father
- Peter Sarsgaard as Dwight Westlake, Jasmine's suitor
- Louis C.K. as Al Munsinger, Ginger's lover
- Andrew Dice Clay as Augie, Ginger's ex-husband
- Bobby Cannavale as Chili, Ginger's boyfriend and Eddie's friend
- Michael Stuhlbarg as Dr. Flicker, the dentist who employs Jasmine
- Alden Ehrenreich as Danny Francis, Hal's son and Jasmine's stepson
  - Charlie Tahan as Young Danny Francis
- Tammy Blanchard as Nora, Jasmine's friend in the Hamptons
- Max Casella as Eddie, Chili's friend
- Glenn Fleshler as Hal and Jasmine's friend

== Production ==
In preparation for her role, Blanchett explained, "I did a lot of people watching. I drank my fair share of rosé. In the end I had to play the anti-heroine that Woody's written, but of course I thought about the Madoff scandal, because that's the holocaust of the financial crisis. And there are many, many women like that. I followed them like everybody else did, but as an actress you go back and you're slightly more forensic about those relationships."

The filming of a scene in San Francisco in December 2012.

The film was shot in 2012 in New York City and San Francisco. Letty Aronson, Stephen Tenenbaum, and Edward Walson served as the film's producers. Sony Pictures Classics distributed the film, marking the sixth collaboration between the label and Allen.

The production participated in the San Francisco "Scene in San Francisco Incentive Program" administered by the San Francisco Film Commission.

The outfits for Blanchett's Jasmine were an important part of her character and narrative, but they were difficult to assemble because of a very limited total costume budget of $35,000. To supplement this, costume designer Suzy Benzinger used her and Woody Allen's connections with various fashion houses to borrow some of the more expensive items for the production. These included Fendi, Chanel, Hermès, Oscar de la Renta and Carolina Herrera. Blanchett also helped, by using her relationship with Louis Vuitton to secure monogrammed luggage for the production, after Vuitton refused Benzinger's request. Karl Lagerfeld supplied two copies of the white Chanel bouclé jacket which Jasmine wears throughout the film, one brand new for the flashback scenes of Jasmine's affluent life in New York, and one for the San Francisco scenes which Benzinger distressed by soaking in fabric softener to give it the appearance of overuse.

== Release ==
Blue Jasmine had a limited release at six theaters in Los Angeles and New York City on July 26, 2013, and expanded nationwide on August 23, 2013. Woody Allen refused to release the film in India because the country requires a blurb to be inserted at the bottom of any scenes during which a character is smoking. This is in addition to health warnings that are required to be shown at the beginning and end of the film.

=== Home media ===
Blue Jasmine was released on Blu-ray and DVD on January 21, 2014.

== Reception ==
=== Box office ===
The film received a slow rollout, modeled after the release of Midnight in Paris; it was estimated to have grossed over US$600,000 in its first three days, which took place at six theaters in Los Angeles and New York City. It was Allen's "best-ever opening per-screen average" and the year's highest per-screen average, beating Spring Breakers' "impressive debut on three screens". The film grossed US$33.4 million in the United States and US$64.1 million in the rest of the world.

=== Critical response ===
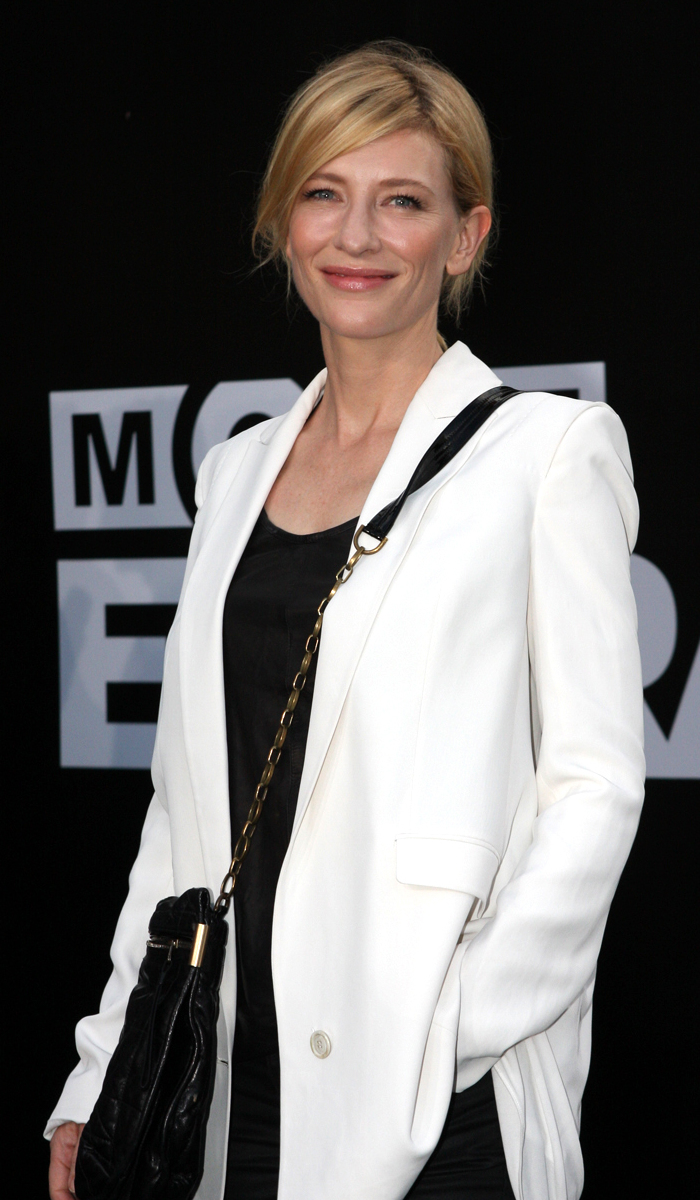
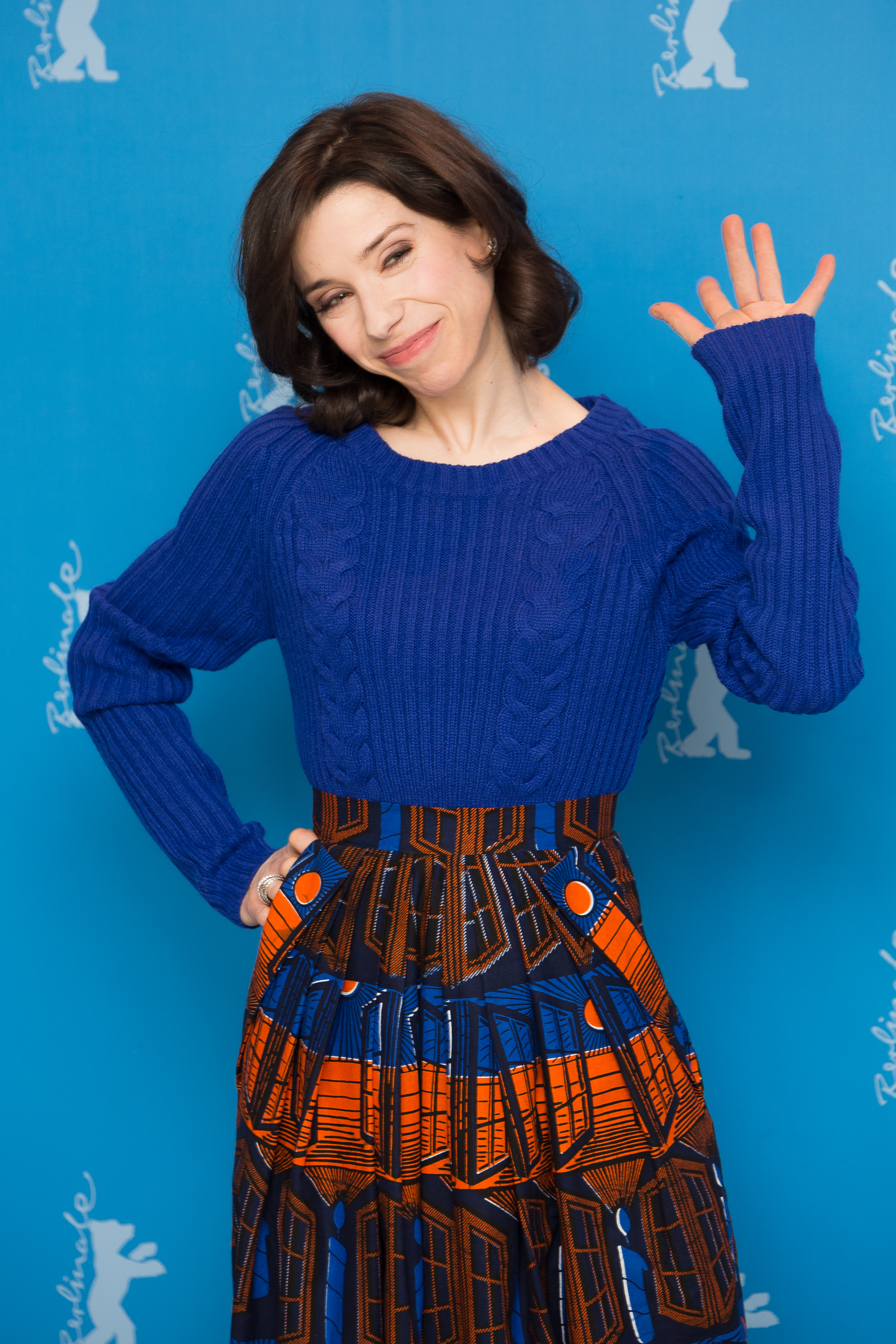
The performances of Cate Blanchett and Sally Hawkins garnered critical acclaim, earning them Academy Award nominations for Best Actress and Best Supporting Actress respectively, with Blanchett winning her category.

On the review aggregator website Rotten Tomatoes, 90% of 233 critics' reviews are positive, with an average rating of 8.1/10. The website's consensus reads: "Woody Allen's Blue Jasmine finds the director in peak late-period form – and benefiting from a superb cast led by Cate Blanchett." Metacritic, which uses a weighted average, assigned the film a score of 78 out of 100, based on 47 critics, indicating "generally favorable" reviews.

Early reviews suggested the film would be rated very highly among Allen's recent offerings, and praised Blanchett's performance as one of her strongest, if not the best of her career: David Denby of The New Yorker stated that "in all, this is the strongest, most resonant movie Woody Allen has made in years". Mick LaSalle, writing for the San Francisco Chronicle, wrote that "Blanchett in Blue Jasmine is beyond brilliant, beyond analysis. This is jaw-dropping work, what we go to the movies hoping to see, and we do. Every few years." Writing for Rolling Stone, Peter Travers stated: "Blanchett is the film’s glory. She is miraculous at finding the bruised heart of this bullying elitist. If her struggle doesn't win respect, it does earn our empathy. The sight of Jasmine – lost, alone and unable to conjure magic out of unyielding reality – is devastating. This is Blanchett triumphant, and not to be missed." Andrew Dice Clay's performance was also critically praised in the film.

Some critics have argued the film is Allen's response or tribute to the Tennessee Williams play A Streetcar Named Desire, as it shares a very similar plot and characters. It also features cast members who have previously been associated with the play: Baldwin played the role of Stanley Kowalski on stage in 1992 and in the 1995 adaptation of the play, while Blanchett played the leading role of Blanche DuBois in the Australian production of the play staged by the Sydney Theatre Company in 2008. Other critics and cultural commentators theorized that the story of Jasmine as a "shrill narcissist falling apart" and "in a crisis of self-flagellation after living in denial for years" was modeled on Allen's former companion, Mia Farrow, and that the film is a response to their high-profile and acrimonious break-up.

=== Accolades ===
At the 2014 Academy Awards ceremony, Blue Jasmine had three nominations: Best Actress for Blanchett, Best Supporting Actress for Hawkins and Best Original Screenplay for Allen. Blanchett was the sole winner. At the 2014 Golden Globe Awards ceremony, the film had two nominations: Best Actress in a Motion Picture – Drama for Blanchett and Best Supporting Actress – Motion Picture for Hawkins, with Blanchett going on to win. Blanchett also won Best Actress at the BAFTAs, Screen Actors Guild Awards, and Independent Spirit Awards. Allen's screenplay was also nominated at the Writers Guild of America Awards and the film was nominated for or won dozens of other awards worldwide.
