= Mr. Turner (soundtrack) =

Mr. Turner (Original Motion Picture Soundtrack)

Film score by Gary Yershon
- Released: 9 December 2014
- Recorded: 2014
- Studios: Air-Edel; British Grove
- Genre: Film score
- Length: 28:29
- Label: Varèse Sarabande
- Producer: Gary Yershon

Gary Yershon chronology
A Running Jump (2012)	Mr. Turner (2014)	Peterloo (2018)

Mr. Turner (Original Motion Picture Soundtrack) is the soundtrack to the 2014 film of the same name directed by Mike Leigh based on the life of English painter J. M. W. Turner. Gary Yershon composed the film's score which released through Varèse Sarabande on 9 December 2014 to positive reviews and earned him a nomination for Academy Award for Best Original Score.

== Background ==
Mr. Turner is Yershon's third collaboration with Leigh after Happy-Go-Lucky (2008) and Another Year (2010). Both Yershon and Leigh refrained from emitting the 19th century through the music—which is the style of music for most conventional period drama—as the latter did not want it to be felt pastiche. This provided him Yershon freedom for exploring other musical vocabularies. He had composed music from the Royal Academy sequence to Turner's encounter with Soane and Pickersgill in the ante-chamber. But, as he discussed with Leigh, he came up with a conclusion that a lot of music being unnecessary which resulted him cutting down the cues from several sequences.

Yershon used the saxophone, clarinet and strings and eventually performed in glissando to follow the modern techniques. For the Royal Academy sequence, the timpani is played by an unconventional musical ensemble which involves saxophonists and tuba players. Initially, Yershon wanted the string ensemble to play for a concerto grosso for a string quintet, but eventually led them to play for the particular sequence.

== Release ==
The original score for Mr. Turner was distributed as an album through Varèse Sarabande. The 21-track album which runs for 28 minutes, was released internationally on 9 December 2014 and accompanied by the music for Leigh's short film A Running Jump (2012), also composed by Yershon. The album also contained eight cues from the short film's score running for nearly 27 minutes, that expand the album's length to 56 minutes.

== Reception ==
Joe Morgenstern of The Wall Street Journal called it as an "exquisite, unobtrusively modernist music". Matt Goldberg of Collider wrote "Gary Yershon's score is triumphant but in between the notes there's a mournful, off-key tune." Peter Bradshaw of The Guardian wrote "Gary Yershon's delicate score creates the groundwork for its pathos." Daniel Kasman of Mubi wrote "The score, by Gary Yershon, was, unlike the film, always surprising and working in an unsettling, subtle dissonant key". Scott Foundas of Variety wrote "Composer Gary Yershon's original score alternates an atonal woodwind theme with sharp, staccato strings to create something like the musical equivalent of Turner's restless, roiling spirit." Dana Stevens of Slate wrote "The score by Gary Yershon is unexpectedly modern and spare, interrupting the sense of period verisimilitude and leaving the viewer a little off balance, as if to remind us that Turner, too, wasn't quite of own time."

== Track listing ==
Mr. Turner (Original Motion Picture Soundtrack) track listing
No.	Title	Length
1.	"Mr. Turner"	3:22
2.	"Colour Shop and Market"	1:34
3.	"Preparations"	0:59
4.	"To Petworth"	0:39
5.	"Margate Sands"	0:28
6.	"Long Time Ago"	0:20
7.	"Ailing"	1:10
8.	"Mourning"	0:46
9.	"Quiet House"	0:57
10.	"Walks"	1:01
11.	"Varnishing Day"	0:26
12.	"Action Painting"	1:28
13.	"Lashed to the Mast"	1:11
14.	"Margate Again"	1:21
15.	"The Fighting Temeraire"	1:22
16.	"Steam Railway"	0:49
17.	"Critics"	0:57
18.	"Low"	1:35
19.	"On the Jetty"	1:37
20.	"Old and New"	2:10
21.	"End Credits"	4:17
Total length:		28:29

== Accolades ==
Accolades for Mr. Turner (Original Motion Picture Soundtrack)
Award	Category	Result	Ref.
Academy Awards	Best Original Score	Nominated	
ASCAP Film and Television Music Awards	Best Film Music	Nominated	
Ivor Novello Awards	Best Original Film Score	Nominated	
