= William Robert Hay =

British barrister (1761–1839)

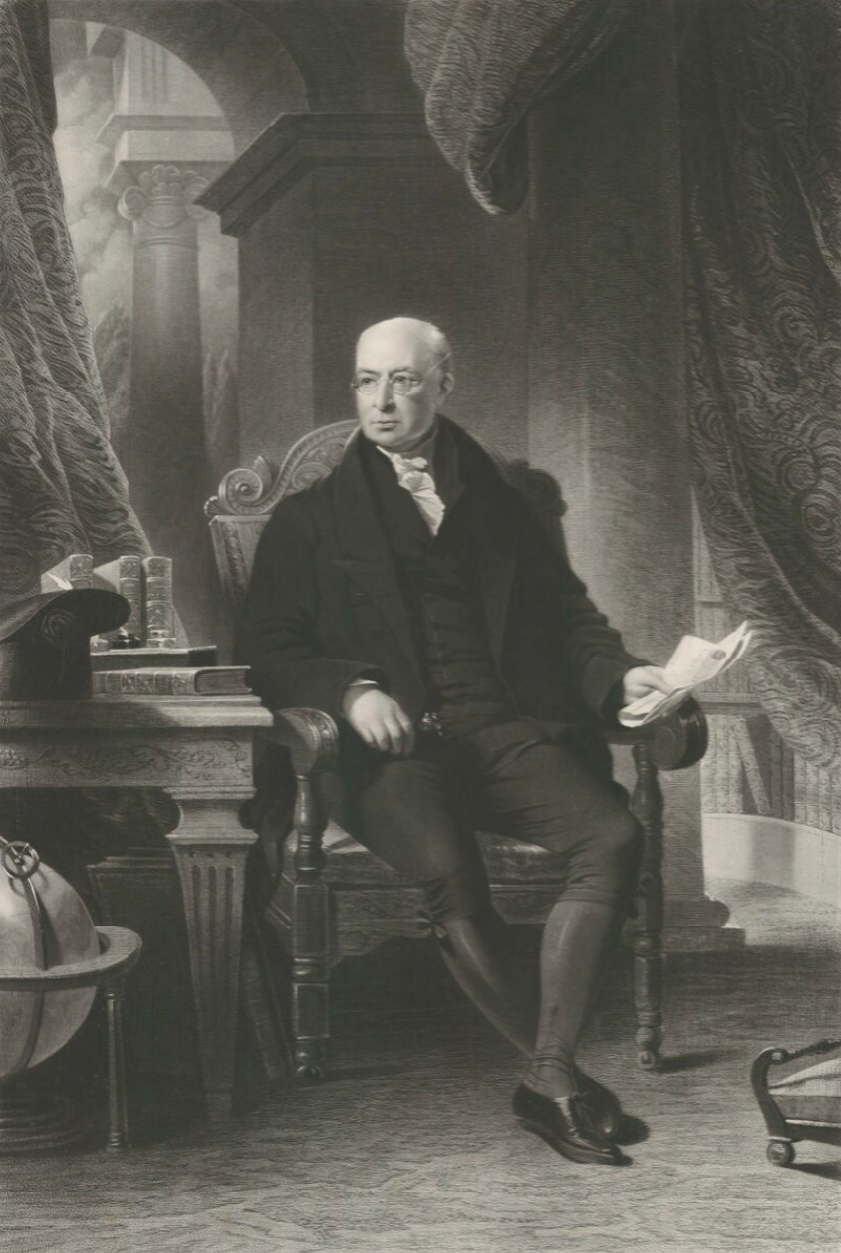
William Robert Hay, 1837 engraving

William Robert Hay (1761–1839) was a British barrister, cleric and magistrate, one of the Manchester group associated with the Peterloo Massacre.

== Early life ==
He was the son of Edward Hay, a diplomat and Governor of Barbados, and his wife Mary Flower, and grandson of George Hay, 8th Earl of Kinnoull. Born in Portugal, he was sent when young to England, and was brought up for some years by Archbishop Robert Hay Drummond, his uncle. He was on good terms with Robert, the archbishop's eldest son, and was sent to Westminster School with his older brother Thomas. He matriculated at Christ Church, Oxford in December 1776, six months after Thomas and at age 15, graduating B.A. 1780 and M.A. in 1783.

Hay entered the Inner Temple in 1781, and was called to the bar in 1788. He then went the northern circuit. He had little success as a barrister, but was employed by Sir John Parker Mosley, 1st Baronet as steward to the Manchester manorial court. He was elected to the membership of Manchester Literary and Philosophical Society on 26 April 1793.

== Clerical career ==
Possibly influenced by Lewis Bagot, a connection by marriage, Hay was ordained deacon in 1797, priest in 1798, and was placed at Ashton-under-Lyne. He was assistant curate at Disley, in 1798. In 1799 he was curate at Hollinwood for Rev. John Darbey. He lived at Dukenfield Lodge, a property in his wife's family that was owned by Francis Dukinfield Astley.

In 1802 Charles Bragge, a family connection, presented Hay to the rectory of Ackworth, West Yorkshire. In 1806 William Markham gave him a prebend in York Minster.

== Magistrate ==
Hay in May 1801 was one of the magistrates who dispersed a meeting near Saddleworth. It was not covert, having been advertised by handbills, despite the Seditious Meetings Act 1795, recently revived. Writing to William Cavendish-Bentinck, 3rd Duke of Portland, the Home Secretary, Hay reported that the meeting had been peaceful, the magistrates had had no specific intelligence, and seditious intent would be hard to prove. Later that month, as part of the same campaign of 1800–1 to close down public expression of disaffection on the border between Lancashire and Yorkshire, Hay with another magistrate dispersed another meeting near Buckton. Hay's comment to the Home Office stated again that the meeting was peaceful and seditious intent would be hard to establish; but argued expediency.

In 1803 Hay was elected chairman of the quarter sessions for Salford Hundred, succeeding Thomas Butterworth Bayley, who had died in 1802; at this point he had been a justice of the peace in the West Riding of Yorkshire, Lancashire and Cheshire for some years. Salford Hundred, one of the four traditional divisions of Lancashire, was centred on Manchester. Bayley, Hay and Thomas Bancroft, vicar of Bolton, formed a discriminating group gathering local intelligence and showing scepticism to claims of their spies and informants, whom they recruited carefully. Their attitude differed from other, more credulous magistrates.

In 1812, at the time of the disorder at the Manchester Cotton Exchange and the reading of the Riot Act by two magistrates (Silvester and Wright), Hay found an ally in Charles Ethelston. They were like-minded.

In 1818 Hay was deprecating to Henry Hobhouse of the Home Office the reluctance of manufacturers to use the Combination acts against strikers in the cotton industry who were attacking factories, putting it down to fear. In January 1819, Hay was called out in the series "Letters to the Treason-Hunting Municipality of Manchester" appearing in the Manchester Observer, by the radical printer William Ogden: "As a magistrate, you have taken an active part in committing to prison a great number of not only innocent but worthy men". In July 1819 Hay warned a grand jury that the cap of liberty associated with the French Revolution was being displayed at radical meetings.

Present as a magistrate on 16 August 1819 at Peterloo, Hay wrote the letter of that evening to Lord Sidmouth giving an account of the events, James Norris being "very much fatigued by the harassing duty of this day". He included the reading of the Riot Act, and the arrests of Henry Hunt and Joseph Johnson. In the film Peterloo by Mike Leigh, Hay is played by Jeff Rawle.

In October 1819, Hay attended a dinner given by Lord Liverpool, the Prime Minister, where he was treated with high regard by Sir John Copley, the Solicitor General. The Seditious Meetings Act 1819 of December reportedly owes clauses to suggestions made by Hay to Copley.

== Later life ==
Hay was created vicar of Rochdale on 3 January 1820. The Rochdale incumbent Thomas Drake (1745–1819) had died in September. He had ordered volunteer troops to fire on a crowd during a 1795 riot, causing two deaths, and his reputation had suffered. Other candidates for this wealthy living were Thomas Dunham Whitaker, and George D'Oyly who had better prospects elsewhere at Lambeth. Hay was successful with the backing of the Manchester municipal establishment. Hay continued to hold the Ackworth rectory with a dispensation; he had curates there, William James Farrington (1820), John Hope (1821), Richard Bassnett (1823), and Thomas Frederick Paull Hankins (1828). At Rochdale also he had curates, beginning with James Aspinall (1824), and including Francis Robert Raines (1829–1832). Raines wrote "Mr. Hay seems never to have been known in his parish as a clergyman, but only as a lawyer and a politician." Henry Charles Beeching in the Dictionary of National Biography called Hay an absentee Erastian.

In the early 1820s the legal issues raised by Peterloo were still live, and the legal doctrine of unlawful assembly was still being worked out through case law. Hay was cross-examined in Redford v Birley (1822), before George Sowley Holroyd. On the question of at what point the Peterloo assembly became illegal, Hay stated:

I will explain what I mean by tumultuous; that sort of meeting I consider illegal, and a breach of the peace, either in point of common sense, or according to legal authorities.

Hay gave up his position as chairman of the Salford Quarter Sessions in 1823, and was seriously ill in 1824. He was replaced as chairman by Thomas Starkie, and then in 1825 by James Norris. He was briefly back in court in 1825, and not in a good temper, after Starkie resigned, for a right of way case involving the magistrate Ralph Wright, at Flixton.

At Rochdale, Hay was still active in local politics in the last summer of his life, extending the hustings on a vote affecting church rates. The church rate issue in Rochdale had been vexed for nearly a generation. Jacob Bright, father of John Bright, had refused to pay it over 20 times, from 1811 to 1833.

Hay died on 10 December 1839, at Ackworth rectory. His obituary in the Gentleman's Magazine compared Hay's role at Peterloo with that of Sir Thomas Phillips in the recent Newport Rising. He was succeeded at Rochdale by John Edward Nassau Molesworth; and at Arkworth by Edmund Goodenough Bayly.

== Collector ==
Much material collected by Hay was added to scrapbooks. Manuscripts, commonplace books and scrapbooks (18 volumes) went to Chetham's Library. Other manuscripts came into the hands of A. P. Wadsworth, whose daughter Janet gave them in 1957 to the John Rylands Library. These scrapbooks, mostly consisting of newspaper cuttings, are in some ways comparable with those of the Yorkshire antiquarian and diarist Dorothy Richardson (1748–1819). Hay's interests included poetry, trivia and the local volunteer corps. The scrapbooks were maintained in parallel with commonplace books. The scrapbooks and other papers were given by Hay's daughter Mary, after his death, to Francis Robert Raines.

Hay had a numismatic collection. Many items in it came from friends including Sarah Sophia Banks, with whom he shared interests such as token coins and ephemera. Hay annotated contemporary numismatic catalogues, the Correct and Complete Representation of All the Provincial Copper Coins, Tokens of Trade, and Cards of Address by Charles Pye senior, and The Virtuoso's Companion and Coin Collectors Guide (2 vols.) by Thomas Prattent, and a List of Provincial Copper Coins or Tokens by Samuel Birchall. Hay's method has been identified as a species of Grangerisation.

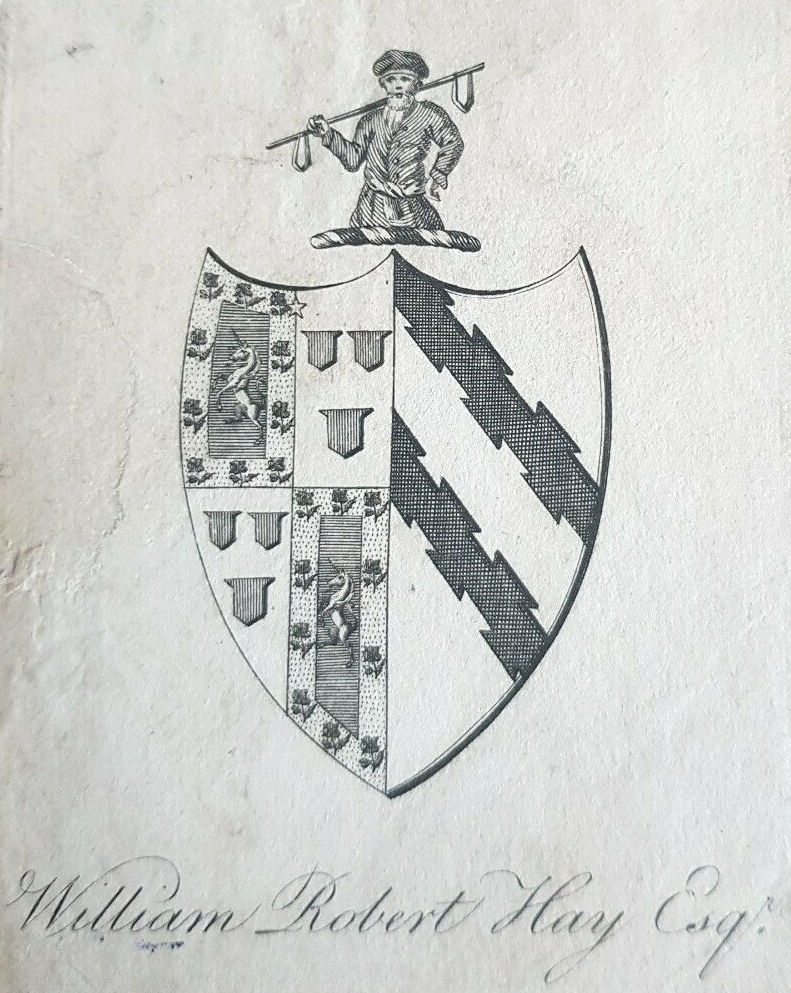
Armorial bookplate of William Robert Hay

A collection of books of Puritan sermons went on Hay's death to Alexander Barclay, the bookseller at York, along with Hay's large collection of pamphlets on politics and religion. The pamphlet collection was purchased by Charles Winn (1795–1874) from Barclay in 1839 and is now in the library at Nostell Priory, owned by the National Trust. A large trunk of papers went to Hay's brother Thomas. He left two libraries, at Ackworth and Rochdale, and paintings including a portrait by Godfrey Kneller of his paternal grandmother Abigail Harley, daughter of Robert Harley, 1st Earl of Oxford and Earl Mortimer.

== Family ==
Hay married in 1793 Mary Wagstaffe, widow of John Astley, daughter of William Wagstaffe.
