= Charles Ethelston =

English cleric (1790–1831)

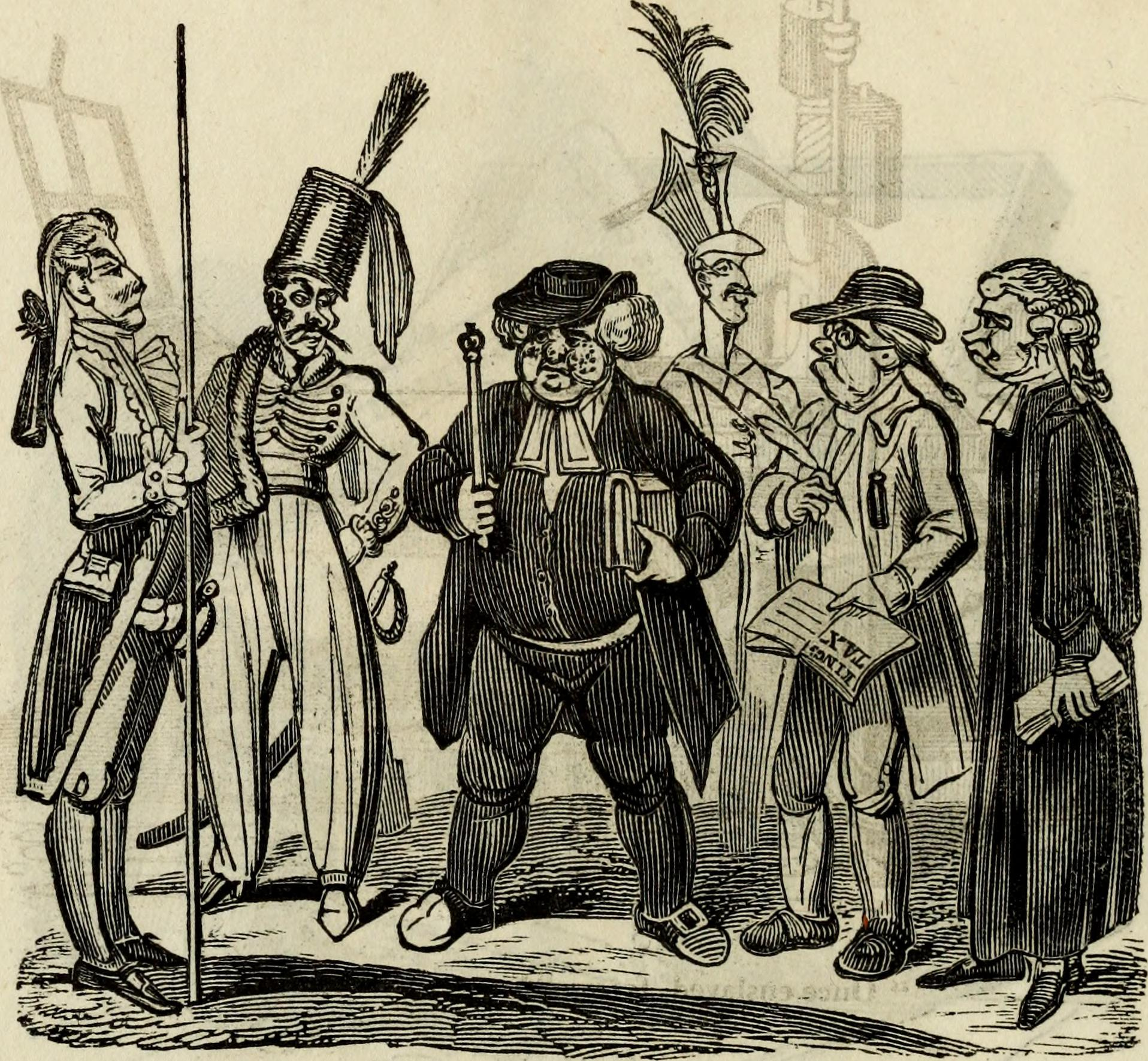
Political caricature from 1819, the central figure with the staff intended as Charles Ethelston

Charles Wickstead Ethelston, also given as Wicksted (1767–1830) was an English cleric, now remembered for the part he played in his role as magistrate on 16 August 1819, ahead of the Peterloo massacre.

== Early life ==
He was the son of the Rev. Charles Ethelstone (1731–1795), an Oxford graduate, and his wife Margaret Hart (died 1803) of Salford. He was educated at Manchester Grammar School under Charles Lawson, and matriculated at Trinity College, Cambridge in 1787, graduating B.A. in 1790 and M.A. in 1793. He was known also by the surnames Ethelstone and Ethelstane.

Ethelston became a curate in 1794 at St Mark's Chapel, Cheetham Hill, which was then an urbanising area adjacent to Manchester and Salford. His father, who died the following year, had recently completed it, at his own expense, on the Shooting Butts field at Cheetham; it was a chapel of ease between the Church of St Mary the Virgin, Prestwich and Manchester Collegiate Church, for which Charles Ethelstone the elder had permission to build in 1790, in a hamlet where cotton merchants lived. The chapel was consecrated on 24 July 1794 by William Markham. Later, Ethelston became a perpetual curate there. A Jubilee School was built in Cheetham, and a plot of land obtained from Lord Ducie to build a church to seat 1500. The church was closed in 1982, and demolished around 1998.

In 1801, Ethelston was made rector of Worthenbury, near Wrexham. The presentation was presumably (according to Francis Robert Raines) by Sir Richard Price Puleston, 1st Baronet. In 1804 he became a Fellow of Manchester Collegiate Church.

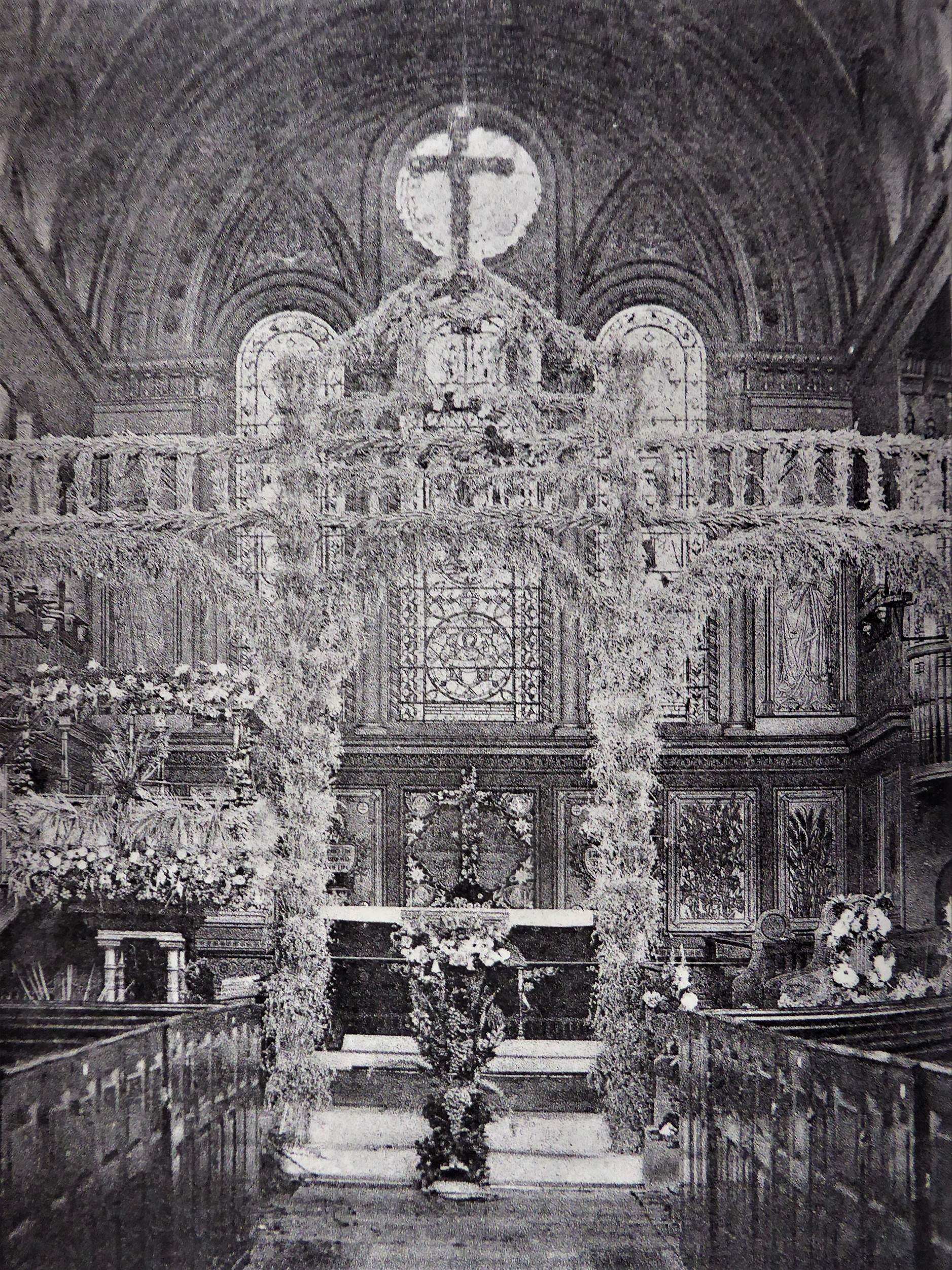
St Mark's Church, Cheetham Hill, interior in 1891

== Civic Manchester ==
Ethelston was chaplain to Silvester's Volunteers, raised in 1803 by John Silvester. Silvester was a millowner and magistrate, and the volunteer unit, the 2nd Regiment of the Manchester and Salford Rifle Volunteers, was active against Luddites.

For the Golden Jubilee of George III, celebrated on 25 October 1809, Ethelston addressed in the Collegiate Church John Ratliff the borough-reeve and his constables, joined by the Masonic Lodge and the Orange Order. There was a procession on to St Ann's Square, celebratory gunfire from dragoons and a volley from the rifle brigade. A loyal toast was drunk, and dinner for around 250 eaten at the Manchester Cotton Exchange. Nearly 800 children from the Lancasterian school lined Lever Street.

In 1812, Ethelston and Silvester were among a group of loyalists intending to hold a dinner in the Exchange, with a toast and pledge to the Prince Regent. It was frustrated by an occupation of the Exchange, that led to vandalism. In 1814 Ethelston was a founding board member of Manchester Royal Eye Hospital.

== Magistrate ==
Clerical magistrates were common in England in the later 18th century and early 19th century. Their numbers dropped back after 1832 and the Great Reform Act: in 1740 they were uncommon. In Lancashire the custom was to exclude manufacturers from the bench, to keep it impartial in trade disputes: the practical result was that it was dominated by landowners and clerics, and by High Church and High Tory views. In Manchester at this period the prominent magistrates, according to Marlow, were the lawyer James Norris, and two clerics, Ethelston and William Robert Hay.

As a magistrate, Ethelston employed informers and spies, passing information about possible subversion to the Home Office. The Home Office funded spies in industrial districts: for Ethelston and Hay, and also Ralph Fletcher, magistrate at Bolton, John Lloyd who was a magistrate's clerk at Stockport, and Henry Enfield, town clerk of Nottingham. In 1816 Ethelston was encouraged by John Hiley Addington, at the Home Office as parliamentary secretary to his brother Lord Sidmouth, to employ spies. Ethelston, Fletcher and Hay had in common membership of the Loyal Orange Institution.

Ethelston had some success in 1817, when he sent Samuel Fleming and another spy into Yorkshire, to look for pikes being stored. Fleming was an Irish weaver who had served in Silvester's Volunteers.

In 1818 Ethelston clashed with and abused Thomas Chapman, proprietor of the Manchester Observer, at a vestry meeting of the Manchester parish. Chapman was concerned with the oversight of the accounts of the local constables. In 1818 also, during the weavers' strike, the magistrates Ethelston, Norris, William Marriott, and Ralph Wright pre-empted a planned meeting of weavers on 4 September, at Ashton Cross, Tameside, with a notice that such assemblies of the unemployed were a danger to the public peace.

=== Events of 1819 ===
Subsequently, Ethelston's credibility with the Home Office dropped. He wrote to Lord Sidmouth in June 1819 of an intended "general rising". Fleming had fed him a report that William Cobbett's visit to Lancashire was the signal for such a rising. His spy John Livesey tried to make direct contact with Sidmouth in London during 1819, claiming Ethelston had directed him to do so.

In The Making of the English Working Class, E. P. Thompson wrote of summer 1819 that "The government wanted blood – not a holocaust, but enough to make an example." In the historiography of Peterloo, however, Thompson's thesis from 1963, in the form that the Home Office deliberately triggered violence against the meeting in St Peter's Field, has been challenged.

Correspondence of the Home Office with Lancashire magistrates was through Henry Hobhouse, under-secretary of state from 1817 to 1827. He made it clear that the magistrates should set their house in order. In January 1819 he used a phrase about blood "shed either by the Law or the sword", prompted by a letter from Ralph Fletcher. On 23 July the Select Committee of Lancashire and Cheshire Magistrates was formed, and its first act was to lay a case of seditious libel against James Wroe, editor of the Manchester Observer.

=== 16 August 1819, Peterloo ===
The magistrates most involved with Peterloo were Ethelston, Hay, Hulton and Norris. The roles of both Ethelston, reader of the Riot Act, and William Hulton who brought in the militia, were later questioned as part of revisionism applied to Thompson's account. Marlow argues that the invocation of the Riot Act was a side-issue, the magistrates having power in common law to disperse crowds.

The four were present, and Hulton chaired the committee of magistrates. From around 11 am, a group of nearly a dozen Lancashire and Cheshire magistrates were at Edmund Buxton's house on Mount Street, overlooking St Peter's Field. It included also Ralph Fletcher, William Marriott, John Silvester and Ralph Wright.

The radicals' meeting on St Peter's Field began at 1.40 pm, as Henry Hunt started to speak. Hulton's committee took two decisions: to arrest leading radicals; and to disperse the crowd. The stentorian Ethelston read the Riot Act from a window in the Mount Street house, at a point between the attempted enforcements of those decisions. Hay gave an account of how Ethelson hung out of the window, and he had stood behind, ready to catch the tails of Ethelston's coat if he had started to topple. It is not clear that Ethelston was heard. Silvester then left the house, and read the Riot Act from a card.

In the film Peterloo by Mike Leigh, Ethelston is played by Vincent Franklin.

=== Aftermath of Peterloo ===
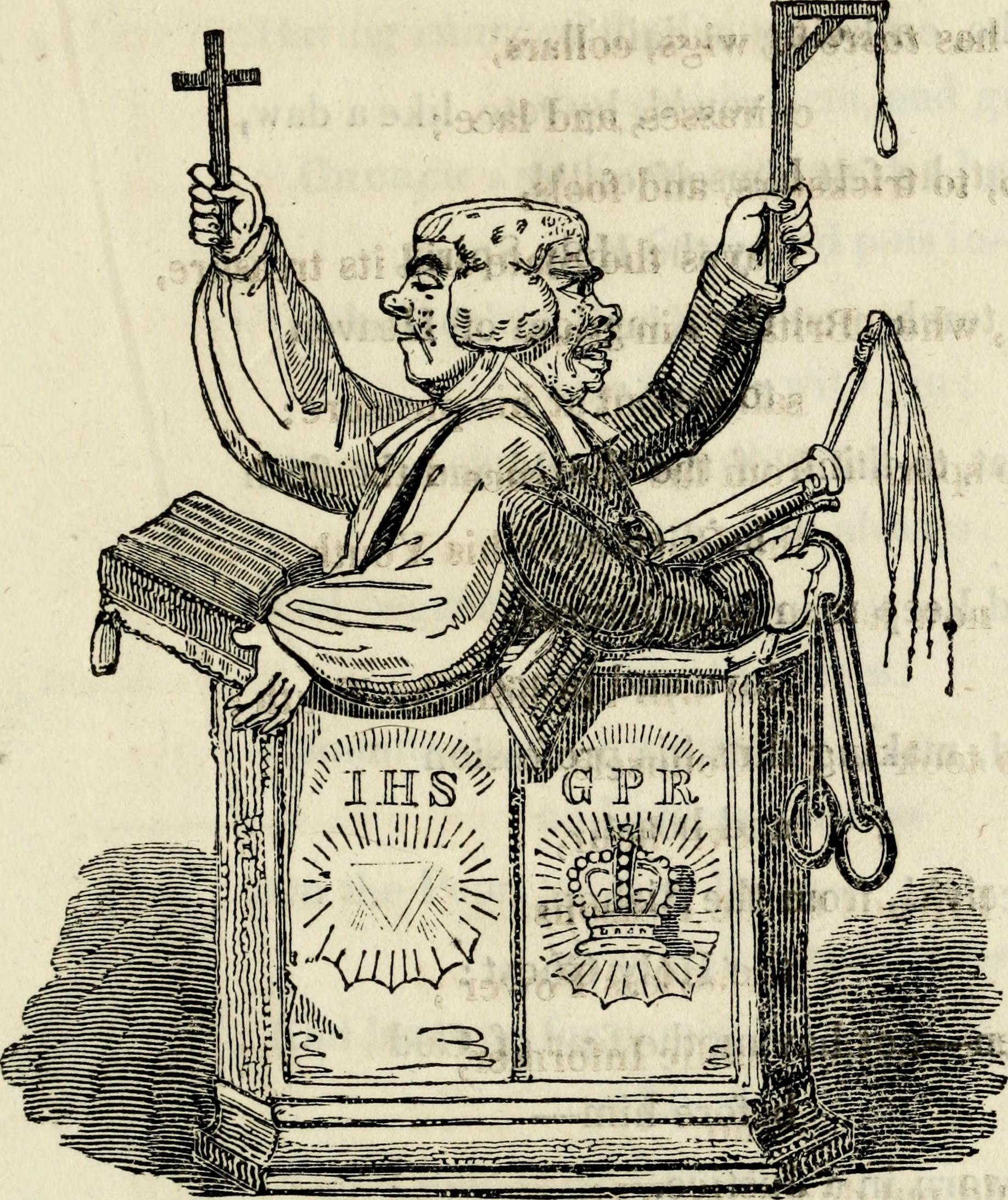
Caricature of a two-faced clerical magistrate, from 1819, with the right-hand part holding gallows, scourge, blunderbuss and shackles.

Some days afterwards, according to a letter published in the Manchester Observer, Ethelston said while preaching that Peterloo was the will of God. Henry Hunt appeared before the magistrates on 20 August, initially charged with high treason, those on the bench being Sir William Bagshawe, Sir John Byng, Ethelston, Ralph Fletcher, William Hulton, William Marriott, James Norris as chairman, Thomas William Tatton, Trafford Trafford, James Watkins and Richard Wright. Ethelston became concerned with headgear: radical supporters were wearing white hats, in imitation of Hunt, with green ribbons, and he wrote to Sidmouth about it on 13 September.

Ethelston defended William Robert Hay in the Manchester Gazette on 25 September 1819, complaining of the ad hominem attacks made on all those who opposed reformers. William Benbow in his Rambler's Magazine in 1822 listed "Hay and Ethelstone" with disreputable clerics as "chief agitators" in Manchester. Satire against clerical magistrates picked on Ethelston. According to Gibson, "It took many years for the people to forget that the magistrates who read the Riot Act at the Peterloo débâcle were Anglican clergy."

Henry Grey Bennet asked the radical John Shuttleworth on 18 November 1819 for information about the magistrates who signed the warrant to arrest Henry Hunt. This request may have prompted the pamphlet Manchester Slaughter! by "Old Radical". It took the form of an unsympathetic review of Ethelston's book of verse from 1803.

A significant publication and best-seller of November 1819 was The Political House that Jack Built, a 24-page verse pamphlet parody of This Is the House That Jack Built, by William Hone, illustrated by George Cruikshank's woodcut caricatures. It contained "The Clerical Magistrate" with lines

If the People were legally Meeting, in quiet
Would pronounce it, decidedly—sec. Stat—a Riot,
And order the Soldiers 'to aid and assist',
That is—kill the helpless, who cannot resist.

The accompanying cut by Cruikshank is based on Ethelston, and contains internal references to the way Cruikshank depicted Lord Castlereagh.

On Sidmouth's retirement from the Home Office, a group of the magistrates signed a letter of thanks to him. Sidmouth replied to them, through Ethelston.

== Last years ==
Ethelston suffered a head injury when the horse of his gig ran away. He resided at addresses west and north of Manchester (see under Family). He died in September 1830, at age 63, and was buried at St Mark's, Cheetham Hill.

== Works ==
- The Suicide with Other Poems (1803)
- Address delivered in the Exchange Room, in Manchester, to a General Meeting convened by the Boroughreeve and Constables, on Wednesday the 11th. of Decr.,1811, for the purpose of Taking into Consideration the Expediency of Founding Schools on the Plan of Dr. Bell (Manchester, 1811), against the Lancasterian system.
- The Unity of the Church (1814), sermon. It was attacked by the Wesleyan Methodist apologist Edward Wesley Hare (1774–1818), writing from Liverpool in 1815, in The Exclusive Claims of Episcopal Ordination Examined and Rejected (1815); he had been on the Manchester circuit in 1813. Ethelston was defended in the anonymous Strictures on Hare's Letters to the Rev. C. Ethelston (1815), and Hare returned to the subject in A Further Vindication of the Methodist Ministry (1816).
- A Patriotic Appeal to the Good Sense of All Parties (1817), pseudonymous, as "An Anti-Jacobin".

== Family ==
Ethelston was twice married: firstly to Mary Threlfall, daughter of John Threlfall of Chorley; and secondly in 1804 to Hannah Edwards, daughter of John Edwards of Kelsterton.

The son of the first marriage was Charles Wicksted Ethelston (1798–1872), a cleric who succeeded his father at Cheetham as a perpetual curate, and was then incumbent at Uplyme in Devon. He married in 1822 Anne Peel, daughter of Robert Peel, of Wallington Hall, Norfolk. The second daughter Ellen Mary married in 1847 Charles Joseph Parke; the youngest daughter Margaret Emily married John Perry-Watlington in 1849.

Edwards Ethelston (1805–c.1868), eldest son of the second marriage, was a surgeon in Manchester; the Cambridge register entry of 1823 for Edwards gives his father's residence as "Collis Smedley", i.e. Smedley Hill now in Smedley, Manchester. Hart Ethelston, third son, was rector of St Mark's, Cheetham from 1831. The Oxford register entry of 1826 for him gives his father's residence as Ardwick. He married Elizabeth Peel, daughter of Edmund Peel of Church Bank. Edwin Ethelston, fourth son, married Julia Croal, daughter of the plantation owner John Croal in Demerara.
