= Jacqueline Riding =

British historian, academic and author

Jacqueline Riding is a British historian, academic and author. She specialises in 18th-century history and has published works on subjects as William Hogarth and the Jacobite rising of 1745.

== Early life and education ==
Riding graduated with a Bachelor of Arts (BA) in History from the University of Leicester, a Master of Arts (MA) in History of Art from Birkbeck, University of London and a PhD from the University of York.

== Career ==
Riding worked as the former curator of the Palace of Westminster before becoming Director of the Handel House Museum. Riding has worked as Books Editor for The Art Newspaper.

In 2016, she published Jacobites: A New History of the ’45 Rebellion. In 2018, she published Peterloo: The Story of the Manchester Massacre. In 2021, she published Hogarth: Life in Progress, which was the Sunday Times Art Book of the Year. In 2023, she published Hogarth's Britons.

She has worked as the art history and historical adviser on several films, including Mr. Turner (2014), Peterloo (2018), Colette (2018), Gwen (2018) and Prizefighter (2022).

She is an Honorary Visiting Fellow of the University of York.

She is a fellow of the Stanford Graduate School of Business, the Clore Leadership Programme, the Society of Antiquaries of Scotland and the Paul Mellon Centre for Studies in British Art. She is a trustee of Sandycombe Lodge and the Jacobite Studies Trust.

She is a writer of the Historical Writers Association.

== Published works ==
- Riding, Jacqueline (2010-10-19). Mid-Georgian Britain. Oxford: Shire Publications. ISBN 978-0-7478-0799-5.
- Riding, Jacqueline (2016-04-07). Jacobites. London Oxford New York New Delhi Sydney: Bloomsbury Publishing. ISBN 978-1-4088-1969-2.
- Riding, Jacqueline (2018). Peterloo. London: Head of Zeus. ISBN 978-1-78669-583-3.
- Riding, Jacqueline (2021-07-01). Hogarth. London: Profile Books. ISBN 978-1-78283-611-7.
- Riding, Jacqueline (2023). Hogarth's Britons. London: Paul Holberton publishing. ISBN 978-1-913645-45-8.
