= I'll Be There (2003 film) =

- Theatrical release poster
- Directed by: Craig Ferguson
- Written by: Craig Ferguson; Philip McGrade
- Produced by: James G. Robinson
- Starring: Charlotte Church; Craig Ferguson; Jemma Redgrave; Ralph Brown; Joss Ackland; Ian McNeice; Imelda Staunton
- Cinematography: Ian Wilson
- Edited by: Sheldon Kahn
- Music by: Trevor Jones
- Production company: Morgan Creek Productions
- Distributed by: Warner Bros. Pictures
- Release dates: June 13, 2003 (United Kingdom); August 1, 2003 (United States)
- Running time: 105 minutes
- Countries: United States; United Kingdom
- Language: English

I'll Be There is a 2003 comedy drama film directed and co-written by Craig Ferguson, who, in his directorial debut, also stars in the film with singer Charlotte Church in her film debut.

== Plot ==
Olivia is a young girl who is blessed with a beautiful, natural singing voice, although few people know that. She was conceived the night her mother met Paul, a Scottish rock star, but the couple fell out of touch. Paul never knew that he had a daughter. Much later, Paul is "sectioned" after a motorcycle accident is viewed as a suicide attempt, and he meets his now 16-year-old daughter while confined to a psychiatric hospital.

Olivia's mother feels she was betrayed by Paul and failed by her own musician father, so she does not want her daughter to be involved in what she sees as the decadent world of rock music. In spite of her mother's attempts to keep them apart, Olivia and Paul get to know each other and they become the family they should have been all along.

== Cast ==
- Craig Ferguson as Paul Kerr
- Charlotte Church as Olivia Edmonds
- Jemma Redgrave as Rebecca Edmonds
- Ralph Brown as Digger
- Ian McNeice as Graham
- Imelda Staunton as Dr. Bridget
- Anthony Head as Sam Gervasi (credited as Anthony Stewart Head)
- Joss Ackland as Evil Edmonds - The BeeLzeeBOPS
- Joseph Alessi as Enzo
- Marion Bailey as Mary
- Dominic Cooper as Boyfriend
- Danny Webb as Denny Wise
- Poppy Elliott as Girlfriend
- Stephen Noonan as Gordano (as Steve Noonan)
- Ravi Aujla as Dr. Nahar
- Tom Ellis as Ivor
- Phyllida Law as Mrs. Williams

== Reception ==
"Ferguson just about saves the whole souffle from collapsing under its own flimsiness. However, the leisurely paced, rather gentle pic — which also gives Welsh classical teen-star Charlotte Church her first movie role" - Derek Elley, Variety
