= List of Mum episodes =

Mum is a British television sitcom created and written by Stefan Golaszewski and starring Lesley Manville. It premiered on BBC Two on 13 May 2016 and concluded after three series, on 19 June 2019.

== Series overview ==
Series	Episodes	Originally released	
Series	Episodes	First released	Last released
1	6	13 May 2016	17 June 2016
2	6	20 February 2018	27 March 2018
3	6	15 May 2019	19 June 2019

== Series 1 (2016) ==
No. overall	No. in series	Title	Directed by	Written by	Original release date	UK viewers (millions)
1	1	"January"	Richard Laxton	Stefan Golaszewski	13 May 2016	1.37
Cathy's family gather at her house on the day of her husband's funeral.
2	2	"February"	Richard Laxton	Stefan Golaszewski	20 May 2016	1.19
It is Cathy's first Valentine's Day without her husband, and her family come round to keep her company.
3	3	"May"	Richard Laxton	Stefan Golaszewski	27 May 2016	0.82
The family help Cathy clear out her garage.
4	4	"August"	Richard Laxton	Stefan Golaszewski	3 June 2016	0.80
Cathy gets ready to go for lunch with a new friend.
5	5	"October"	Richard Laxton	Stefan Golaszewski	10 June 2016	0.87
Kelly is worried about moving to Australia, and Michael and Derek are recovering from a night out.
6	6	"December"	Richard Laxton	Stefan Golaszewski	17 June 2016	0.93
Cathy hosts a New Year's Eve party.

== Series 2 (2018) ==
No. overall	No. in series	Title	Directed by	Written by	Original release date	UK viewers (millions)
7	1	"March"	Stefan Golaszewski	Stefan Golaszewski	20 February 2018	N/A
It is Cathy's 60th birthday and to celebrate the family are going out to lunch.
8	2	"April"	Stefan Golaszewski	Stefan Golaszewski	27 February 2018	N/A
It is Easter Sunday and Cathy and Michael have plans to clear the front room together. Jason and Kelly have other ideas.
9	3	"June"	Stefan Golaszewski	Stefan Golaszewski	6 March 2018	N/A
It is early summer and Cathy has invited everyone around for a barbecue. Pauline and Derek bring his punk daughter, Danielle.
10	4	"July"	Stefan Golaszewski	Stefan Golaszewski	13 March 2018	N/A
Kelly and Jason are leaving early on holiday. Michael has had a bad night.
11	5	"September"	Stefan Golaszewski	Stefan Golaszewski	20 March 2018	N/A
Maureen is in hospital. Cathy sees Michael for the first time in months.
12	6	"November"	Stefan Golaszewski	Stefan Golaszewski	27 March 2018	N/A
Cathy is having a bonfire. Michael is moving on but Cathy has something to tell him.

== Series 3 (2019) ==
No. overall	No. in season	Title	Directed by	Written by	Original release date	UK viewers (millions)
13	1	"Monday"	Stefan Golaszewski	Stefan Golaszewski	15 May 2019	N/A
Cathy and her family gather at a house in the countryside for Derek's birthday.
14	2	"Tuesday"	Stefan Golaszewski	Stefan Golaszewski	22 May 2019	N/A
A hungover Cathy pieces together the events of the previous night. Kelly suffers from bad morning sickness.
15	3	"Wednesday"	Stefan Golaszewski	Stefan Golaszewski	29 May 2019	N/A
The family prepare to leave the house for a walk in the countryside. Jason confronts Michael about his feelings for Cathy.
16	4	"Thursday"	Stefan Golaszewski	Stefan Golaszewski	5 June 2019	N/A
After a meal out, Pauline has had too much to drink. Cathy comforts Jason over the loss of his father.
17	5	"Friday"	Stefan Golaszewski	Stefan Golaszewski	12 June 2019	N/A
It is raining and the family are stuck inside. Cathy looks to tell Jason about her relationship with Michael.
18	6	"Saturday"	Stefan Golaszewski	Stefan Golaszewski	19 June 2019	N/A
The day of Derek's party arrives and Cathy decides to put herself first for once.

== See also ==
- Mum at the British Comedy Guide
