= Good Boy (2023 film) =

British short comedy drama film

- Directed by: Tom Stuart
- Screenplay by: Tom Stuart
- Produced by: Kay Loxley; Max Marlow; Elettra Pizzi; Tom Stuart
- Starring: Ben Whishaw; Marion Bailey
- Cinematography: Adam Singodia
- Edited by: Selina MacArthur
- Music by: Joe Wilson
- Production company: 130 Elektra Films
- Distributed by: Goldcrest Films
- Release date: 2023
- Running time: 16 minutes
- Country: United Kingdom
- Language: English

Good Boy is a 2023 short comedy drama film. It is written and directed by Tom Stuart, and starring Ben Whishaw and Marion Bailey. Good Boy premiered at Leeds International Film Festival. It was shortlisted for Best Live Action Short Film at the 96th Academy Awards.

== Premise ==
Out of money and out of luck, Danny (Whishaw) is determined to turn his life around, but the interventions of his anarchic mum (Bailey) and the reappearance of figures from his past threaten to derail him at every turn.

== Cast ==
- Ben Whishaw as Danny
- Marion Bailey as Jackie
- Dino Fetscher as Leon
- Paul Chahidi as Doctor
- Jocelyn Jee Esien as Nurse
- Mark Monero as Funeral Director
- Wendy Nottingham as Vicar
- Bettrys Jones as Surgeon
- Tommy Belshaw as Pallbearer
- Ephraim Sampson as Pallbearer

== Production ==
The film is written and directed by Tom Stuart in his directorial debut. He has described the film as deeply personal. Stuart has explained that the film was his way of coping with the loss of his own mother, and help process his own feelings of grief. Kay Loxley, Max Marlow, Elettra Pizzi and Tom Stuart produce for 130 Elektra Films, with Alex Gonzalez, Gia Coppola and Goldcrest Films CEO Chris Quested executive producing alongside Emma Thompson. Filming took place on Worthy Farm, Somerset in April 2023.

== Release ==
The film was given a preview screening at the 2023 Glastonbury Festival.
