= Dorothy Atkinson =

English actress and singer (born 1966)

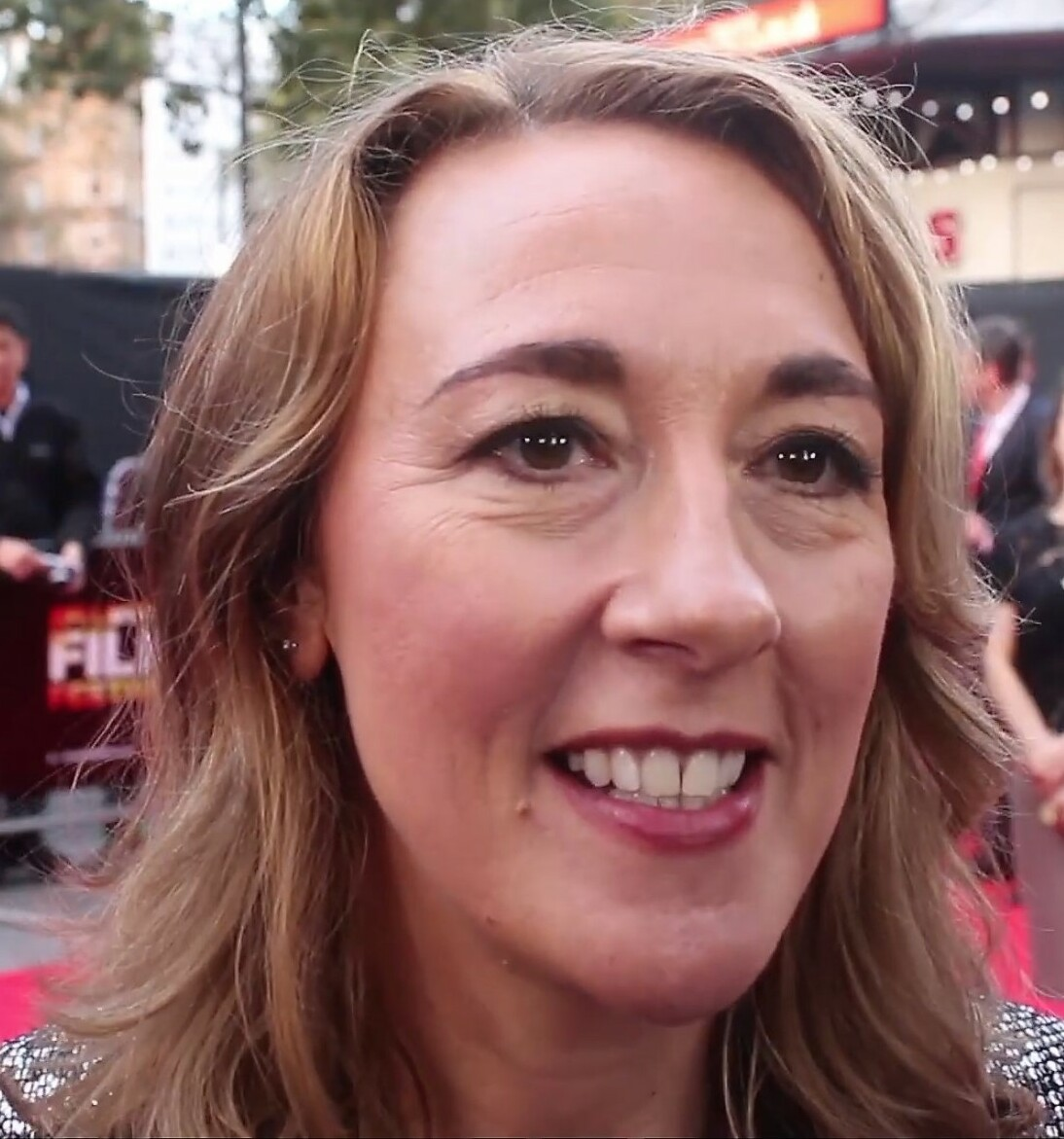
- Atkinson in 2014
- Born: Dorothy Caroline Atkinson; 1966 (age 59–60); Mansfield, England, U.K.
- Occupation: Actress
- Years active: 1988–present
- Spouse: Martin Savage
- Children: 1

Dorothy Caroline Atkinson (born 1966) is an English actress and singer. She has appeared in several plays by playwright Alan Ayckbourn and in films by Mike Leigh, including Topsy-Turvy, All or Nothing, and Mr. Turner, which premiered at the 2014 Cannes Film Festival, and for which she was nominated for the BIFA for Best Supporting Actress.

In television, she has appeared as Zoe Parrish on ITV drama London's Burning, Jane Sutton in the BBC One drama Call the Midwife, Pauline in the BBC Two sitcom Mum, Florence Scanwell in the ITV Encore drama Harlots, and Mary Pennyworth in the Epix/HBO Max drama Pennyworth. An April 2021 announcement stated that Atkinson would be joining the cast of the second series of All Creatures Great and Small as Diana Brompton.

== Personal life ==
Atkinson is from Mansfield in Nottinghamshire, England. Her father was a bursar for a school in Nottinghamshire and she has one sister. Her nickname is "Dot". She is married to actor Martin Savage and they have one son. In July 2026, she was awarded an honorary doctorate by Nottingham Trent University.

== Filmography ==
=== Film ===
Year	Film	Role	Notes
1997	Keep the Aspidistra Flying	Dora	
1999	Topsy-Turvy	Jessie Bond	
2002	All or Nothing	Silent Passenger	
2002	The Final Curtain	Betty (Contestant)	
2004	Every Time You Look at Me	Receptionist	TV film
2005	Look at Me I'm Beautiful	Annie Joplin	Short film
2006	Housewife, 49	Mrs. Mac	TV film
2009	May Contain Nuts	Mrs. Whimhurst	TV film
2009	Mid Life Christmas	Kerry Perry	TV film
2010	Chatroom	Emily's Mother	
2014	Mr. Turner	Hannah Danby	
2014	That Day We Sang	Gertrude Riall	TV film
2015	Peter and Wendy	Nurse Doyle	TV film
2017	The Mercy	Eve Tetley	
2018	Peterloo	Singing Weaver	
2019	The Sands of Venus	Phyllida	Short film
2021	The Electrical Life of Louis Wain	Mrs. DuFrayne	
2023	Saltburn	Paula Quick	

=== Television ===
Year	Title	Role	Network	Notes
1991–1993	London's Burning	Zoe Parrish	ITV	Series regular
1994	Peak Practice	Woman Driver	ITV	Episode: "Long Weekend"
1994	Heartbeat	Connie Gibson	ITV	Episode: "Nice Girls Don't"
2001	Murder in Mind	Julie	BBC One	Episode: "Vigilante"
2003	Holby City	Trudi Halliday	BBC One	Episode: "End of the Line"
2004	Life Begins	Female Organiser	ITV	Episode: "Maggie & Helen"
2004	Murder City	Gill Grieves	ITV	Episode: "Mr. Right"
2005	No Angels	Caroline	Channel 4	Episode: #2.7
2005	Bodies	Sarah Tankard	BBC Three	2 episodes
2006	Heartbeat	Carol Parsons	ITV	Episode: "The Dying of the Light"
2006	The Innocence Project	Fiona Kinsella	BBC One	Episode: #1.3
2007	Skins	Receptionist	E4	Episode: "Effy"
2007	Peep Show	Therapist	Channel 4	Episode: "Holiday"
2008	Sunshine	Jennifer	BBC One	Mini-series, episode: #1.2
2009	Casualty 1909	Nurse Granger	BBC One	Episode: #1.1
2010	PhoneShop	Sue	E4	Episode: "Soldier, Swinger, Shelley, Shelley"
2011	Midsomer Murders	Angela Lawrence	ITV	Episode: "Not in My Back Yard"
2012	Coronation Street	Yvonne Perry	ITV	2 episodes
2012	The Town	Ann	ITV	Mini-series, 2 episodes
2013	Call the Midwife	Jane Sutton	BBC One	Series regular
2015	Code of a Killer	Barbara Ashworth	ITV	Mini-series, 2 episodes
2016	Vera	Shirley Hewarth	ITV	Episode: "The Moth Catcher"
2016–2019	Mum	Pauline	BBC Two	Series regular
2017	Maigret	Claire Grandjean	ITV	Episode: "Night at the Crossroads"
2017	Comedy Playhouse	Teresa Smith	BBC One	Episode: "Mister Winner"
2017	Strike	Kathryn Kent	BBC One	Episode: "The Silkworm"
2017–2018	Harlots	Florence Scanwell	ITV Encore	Series regular
2018	Next of Kin	Annabel Ghillies	ITV	Mini-series, 3 episodes
2019	Hanna	Therapist	Amazon Prime Video	2 episodes: "Town" & "Mother"
2019–2022	Pennyworth	Mrs. Pennyworth	Epix	Series regular
2020–present	Secrets of the Museum	Narrator	BBC Two	Documentary series
2021	All Creatures Great and Small	Diana Brompton	Channel 5	3 episodes
2022	Magpie Murders	Lady Pye	BBC One	5 episodes
2022	Pistol	Sylvia Cook	FX	Mini-series, 4 episodes
2022	Without Sin	Jessie Cole	ITV 1	Mini-series, 4 episodes
2023	Stonehouse	Betty Boothroyd	ITV 1	3 episodes
2023	The Gold	Jeannie Savage	BBC One	4 episodes
2023	The Long Shadow	Betty Hoban	ITV 1	Mini-series, 3 episodes
2024	Inside No. 9	Sheila	BBC One	Series 9, episode 3: "Mulberry Close"
2024	Ludwig	DCS Carol Shaw	BBC One	Series regular
2024	Joan	Mrs. May	ITV 1	Mini-series, 5 episodes
2026	Agatha Christie's Seven Dials	Lady Maria Coote	Netflix	Mini-series

== Theatre ==
Atkinson has performed many shows at the Stephen Joseph Theatre with Alan Ayckbourn, including The Boy Who Fell Into a Book, in which she originated the role of the Queen in 1998.

In 2002, she was nominated for Best Supporting Actress for her performance in Eden End as Lillian, by the Barclays Theatre Awards, an award recognising regional British theatre.

In 2003, she played Marie in the Royal Shakespeare Company's production of Beauty and the Beast by Laurence Boswell.

In 2006, Atkinson played Nora in Epitaph for George Dillon at the Comedy Theatre, and in 2007 the Woman in A Matter of Life and Death at the National Theatre.

In 2009, she played Vera in Just Between Ourselves by Alan Ayckbourn at Northampton's Royal & Derngate Theatre.

Atkinson made her Broadway debut in the 2010 production of Brief Encounter, playing three roles (Dolly/Hermione/Beryl). This production was conceived originally with the Kneehigh Theatre Company (of which she is a member) and she stayed with the show when it moved to New York.

In 2026, she played Fiona Foster in a production of How the Other Half Loves by Alan Ayckbourn at The Old Vic.
