= The Pier =

2011 Irish film

- Film poster
- Directed by: Gerard Hurley
- Written by: Gerard Hurley
- Produced by: Gerard Hurley
- Starring: Karl Johnson; Gerard Hurley; Lili Taylor
- Cinematography: Jesse Cain
- Edited by: Frank Reid
- Music by: Maurice Seezer
- Release date: 4 July 2011 (Karlovy Vary)
- Running time: 89 minutes
- Country: Ireland
- Language: English

The Pier is a 2011 Irish romantic drama film written and directed by Gerard Hurley and starring Karl Johnson, Hurley and Lili Taylor.

== Cast ==
- Karl Johnson as Larry McCarthy
- Gerard Hurley as Jack McCarthy
- Lili Taylor as Grace Ross
- Mary Foskett as June Driscoll
