= The Thing About Vince... =

British comedy-drama series

- Genre: Comedy drama
- Screenplay by: Mark Bussell; Justin Sbresni
- Directed by: Christopher King
- Starring: Timothy Spall; Sheila Hancock; Peter Vaughan; Kellie Bright; Jamie Glover; Marion Bailey
- Music by: Deborah Mollison
- Country of origin: United Kingdom
- Original language: English
- No. of series: 1
- No. of episodes: 3

Production
- Executive producer: Nick Symons
- Producer: Paula Burdon
- Running time: 52 minutes
- Production company: Carlton Television

Original release
- Network: ITV
- Release: 24 July – 7 August 2000

The Thing About Vince... is a 2000 British made-for-television three-episode comedy-drama miniseries directed by Christopher King and starring Timothy Spall and Sheila Hancock.

== Plot ==
Vince, a self-employed builder from London, is a middle-aged man, too old to flirt and too young to retire. He makes a big mistake when during a tropical fish fanciers' weekend, he remains up all night while chatting with a young attractive woman.

== Cast ==
3 episodes

- Timothy Spall as Vince
- Sheila Hancock as Pat
- Peter Vaughan as Ray
- Kellie Bright as Sally
- Jamie Glover as Paul
- Marion Bailey as Wendy
- Bob Mason as John
- Chris Gascoyne as Monk
- Perry Blanks as Robin

2 episodes

- Jeremy Swift as Dr Venn
- Amanda Abbington as Lisa
- Jeillo Edwards as Mrs Cuffy

1 episode

- Jordan Long as TV shop assistant
- Bradley Walsh as Perry
- Richard Graham as Bradshaw
- Bruce Alexander as Edward Turton
- Fiona Allen as Zoe
- Deborah Grant as Anthea Turton
- Richard Heffer as Mr Rigby
