= Marion Bailey =

British actress

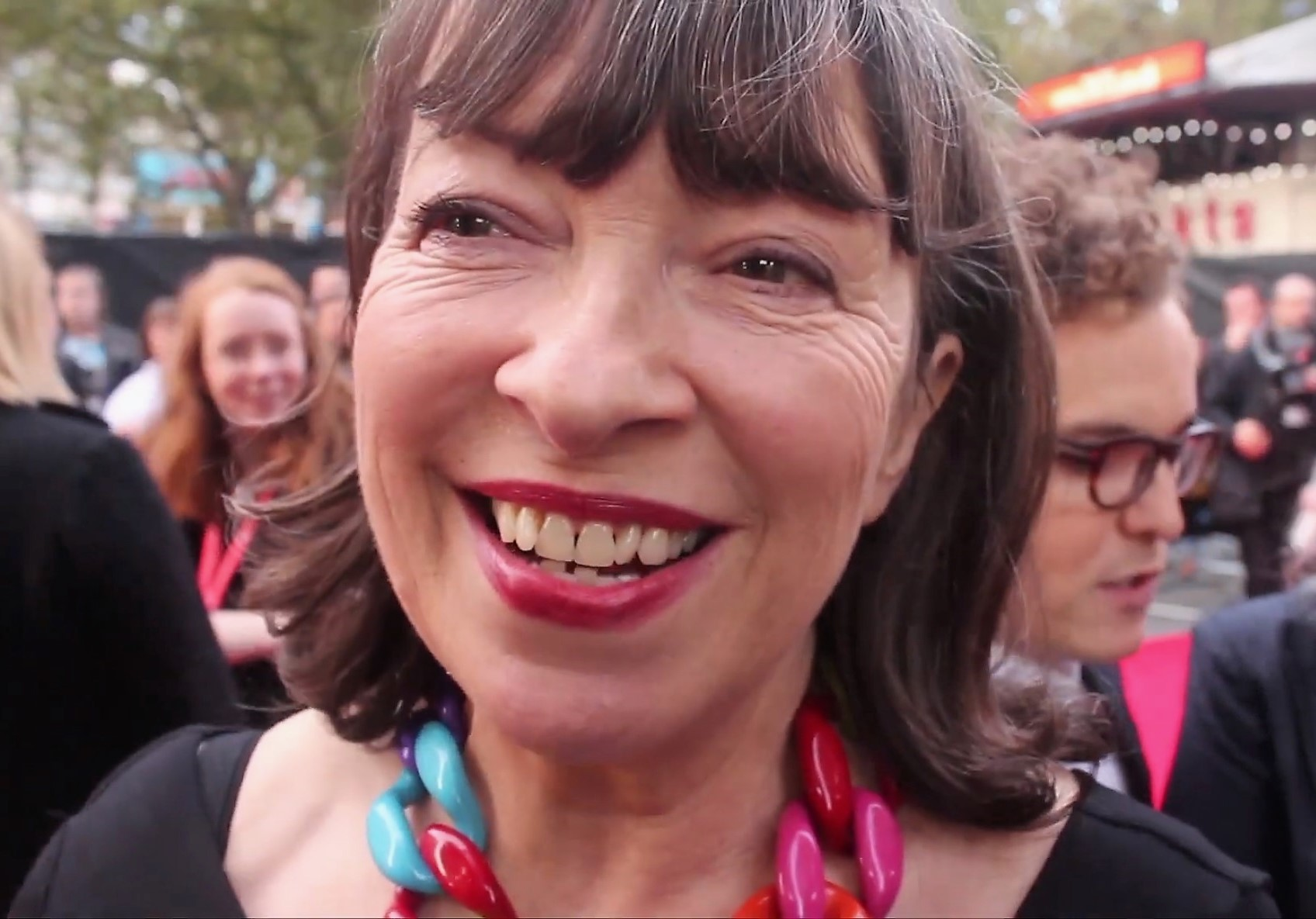
- Bailey in 2014
- Born: 5 May 1951 (age 75); Bushey, Hertfordshire, England
- Education: Guildhall School of Music and Drama
- Occupation: Actress

Marion Bailey (born 5 May 1951) is an English actress. She is best known for her work with her partner, filmmaker Mike Leigh, including the films Meantime (1983), All or Nothing (2002), Vera Drake (2004), Mr. Turner (2014), for which she was nominated for Supporting Actress of the Year by the London Film Critics' Circle, and Peterloo (2018). In 2019 and 2020, she portrayed Queen Elizabeth the Queen Mother in the third and fourth seasons of The Crown on Netflix, for which she won a Screen Actors Guild Award for Best Ensemble in 2020 and 2021. In 2024 she was given an achievement award by the Filming Italy Sardegna festival.

== Personal life ==
Bailey was born in Bushey Hospital, in Bushey, Hertfordshire, to Rose (née Timberlake) and William Bailey. She grew up in Harrow, Middlesex, and attended Pinner County Grammar School. She was a member of the National Youth Theatre of Great Britain and trained at the Guildhall School of Music and Drama. With writer Terry Johnson, she has a daughter, the actress Alice Bailey Johnson.

== Career ==
=== Film ===
Bailey has frequently collaborated with her partner Mike Leigh, such as playing Mrs Booth in Mr. Turner (2014) and Lady Conyngham in Peterloo (2018). Bailey has appeared as Mrs Peach in Debbie Isitt's Nasty Neighbours (1999), Mary in the Craig Ferguson film I'll Be There, and Mrs Adams in Toast (2010). She also appeared in The Lady in the Van (2015), Allied (2016), Dead in a Week or Your Money Back (2018), and played Dinah in Stephen Cookson's Brighton (2019). She co starred with Ben Whishaw in the 2023 short film Good Boy which was shortlisted for Best Live Action Short Film at the 96th Academy Awards.

=== Television ===
Bailey's television work includes Inspector Morse, Casualty, The Bill, Holby City, Midsomer Murders, Agatha Christie's Poirot, A Touch of Frost, Dalziel and Pascoe, Big Deal, Boon, The Bretts, The Ruth Rendell Mysteries, No More Dying Then, Stay Lucky, Heat of the Sun, Micawber, New Tricks, Monday Monday, Being Human and Case Histories. In 1995, she had a recurring role as Avis in the long-running ITV series Shine on Harvey Moon. She also played leading roles in several popular 1980s TV series, including To Have and to Hold, Jury and Charlie.

In 2000, she played Wendy in Carlton's comedy-drama series The Thing About Vince... She has also appeared in many single TV dramas and films including Woyzeck, Way Upstream, Zackharov, Raspberry, Coppers, Derailed, Toast and Jane Austen's Persuasion. She played Jill in the BBC Three comedy series Him & Her, Sue in The Trials of Jimmy Rose, Ingrid in Temple, and Cara in Britannia for Sky. She played Queen Elizabeth the Queen Mother in seasons 3 and 4 of the Netflix series The Crown, for which she was a recipient of two Screen Actors Guild Awards for Outstanding Performance by an Ensemble in a Drama Series. She has most recently appeared in Shakespeare & Hathaway, Endeavour, and the Netflix dramas Obsession and All the Light We Cannot See.

=== Theatre ===
Bailey has worked extensively in British theatre, including London’s West End, the National Theatre, the Royal Court, the Old Vic, Chichester Festival Theatre, Hampstead Theatre, the Arts Theatre, the Kiln, Bristol Old Vic and the West Yorkshire Playhouse.

In 1981 she performed in Mike Leigh's West End theatre play Goosepimples, for which she received a Plays and Players Award nomination as Most Promising Newcomer. In 2007, with the Shared Experience company she received a TMA nomination as Best Supporting Performance for her role in Kindertransport.

Bailey appeared in Mike Leigh's Grief at the National Theatre (2011/12). In 2013 she played the Queen in Handbagged at the Tricycle Theatre and in the production's subsequent West End transfer to the Vaudeville Theatre.

Her most recent appearances were in Dominic Cooke’s production of Medea at Soho Place Theatre and Richard Bean’s To Have and To Hold directed by Terry Johnson at Hampstead Theatre.

== Filmography ==
=== Film ===
| Year | Title | Role | Notes |
|---|---|---|---|
| 1994 | Don't Get Me Started | Gill Lane | |
| 1999 | Nasty Neighbours | Jean Peach | |
| 2000 | Offending Angels | False Mentor | |
| 2002 | All or Nothing | Carol | |
| 2003 | I'll Be There | Mary | |
| 2004 | Vera Drake | Mrs. Fowler | |
| 2006 | The Sickie | Carol | Short |
| 2008 | Domestic Flight | Susan | Short |
| 2010 | Toast | Mrs. Adams | Short |
| 2014 | Mr. Turner | Sophia Booth | |
| 2015 | Fuel to Fire | Dena Monk | |
| 2015 | The Lady in the Van | Housekeeper in Convent | |
| 2015 | National Theatre Live: The Deep Blue Sea | Mrs Elton | |
| 2016 | Allied | Mrs. Sinclair | |
| 2016 | First | Julia | Short |
| 2018 | Dead in a Week or Your Money Back | Penny | |
| 2018 | Peterloo | Lady Conyngham | |
| 2018 | The Therapist | Lonnie | Short |
| 2019 | Brighton | Dinah | |
| 2022 | Tommies | Mrs. Willis | Short |
| 2023 | Good Boy | Jackie | Short |
| 2026 | Tender Loving Care | Birdie | |

=== Television ===
| Year | Title | Role | Notes |
|---|---|---|---|
| 1975 | The Girls of Slender Means | Dormitory Girl | Miniseries (3 episodes) |
| 1983 | Jury | Chloe McCormack | Series 1, episodes 3 & 4 |
| 1983 | Meantime | Barbara | TV movie |
| 1984 | All the World's a Stage | Extract from Woyzeck | Miniseries (1 episode) |
| 1984 | Raspberry | Chris | TV movie |
| 1984 | Miracles Take Longer | Juliet Arnold | 3 episodes |
| 1984 | Charlie | Susan Alexander | Miniseries (4 episodes) |
| 1984 | Sakharov | Ludmilla Kovalov | TV movie |
| 1984 | Scene | Mrs. Piper | Series 17, episode 3 |
| 1984 | Big Deal | Alison Diamond | Series 1 (3 episodes) |
| 1985 | Summer Season | Joanna Potter | Series 1, episode 17 |
| 1985 | Summer Season | Hotel Receptionist | Series 1, episode 25 |
| 1986 | To Have and to Hold | Ann Fletcher | Miniseries (8 episodes) |
| 1987 | Way Upstream | June | TV movie |
| 1988 | Worlds Beyond | Norma Moran | Series 1, episode 12 |
| 1988 | Coppers | Julia | TV movie |
| 1988 | The Bretts | Agnes | Series 2, episode 5 |
| 1989 | Inspector Morse | Fran Pierce | Series 3, episode 4 |
| 1989 | The Ruth Rendell Mysteries | Ros Swan | Series 1 (3 episodes) |
| 1990 | Stay Lucky | Jane Rowlands | Series 2, episode 5 |
| 1990 | Casualty | Joy Waddington | Series 5, episode 5 |
| 1991 | Agatha Christie's Poirot | Jane Mason | Series 3, episode 4 |
| 1992 | The Bill | Dorothy Strafford | Series 8, episode 26 |
| 1992 | Boon | Sheila | Series 7, episode 10 |
| 1993 | The Chief | Isabelle Melly | Series 3, episode 4 |
| 1994 | A Touch of Frost | Eileen Grant | Series 2, episode 3 |
| 1994 | The Bill | Elizabeth Dreyfon | Series 10, episode 17 |
| 1994 | Casualty | Anna Longford | Series 9, episode 10 |
| 1995 | Dangerfield | Angie Millwood | Series 1, episode 3 |
| 1995 | Shine on Harvey Moon | Avis | Series 5 (7 episodes) |
| 1997 | Dalziel and Pascoe | Lorraine Wildgoose | Series 2, episode 2 |
| 1998 | Heat of the Sun | Gwladys Carstairs | Miniseries (1 episode) |
| 1998 | The Bill | Delia Shaw | Series 14, episode 32 |
| 2000 | The Thing About Vince... | Wendy Skinner | Miniseries (3 episodes) |
| 2001 | Shades | Caroline MacIntyre | Series 1, episode 6 |
| 2001 | Micawber | Lady Macefield | Series 1, episode 2 |
| 2005 | Cherished | Marion Harding | TV movie |
| 2005 | Derailed | Diana Kellow | TV movie |
| 2007 | The Bill | Jess Parker | Series 23, episode 20 |
| 2007 | Persuasion | Mrs. Croft | TV movie |
| 2007 | New Tricks | Brenda | Series 4, episode 7 |
| 2008 | Holby City | Lesley Bingham | Series 10, episode 13 |
| 2008 | Midsomer Murders | Alyssa Bradley | Series 11, episode 3 |
| 2009 | Monday Monday | Clara | Series 1, episode 6 |
| 2010–13 | Him & Her | Jill | Series 1–4 (4 episodes) |
| 2010 | Toast | Mrs. Adams | TV movie |
| 2011 | Being Human | Ruth | Series 3, episode 6 |
| 2011 | Case Histories | Gloria Hatter | Series 1, episodes 3 & 4 |
| 2015 | The Trials of Jimmy Rose | Sue Anderson | Miniseries (3 episodes) |
| 2017 | SS-GB | Joan Woods | Miniseries (1 episode) |
| 2019 | Temple | Ingrid | Series 1, episode 4 |
| 2019 | Britannia | Cara | Series 2 (3 episodes) |
| 2019–20 | The Crown | Queen Elizabeth the Queen Mother | Series 3–4 (18 episodes) |
| 2021 | Endeavour | Hilda Bruce-Potter | Series 8, episode 3 |
| 2022 | This Is Going to Hurt | Callie's Mother | Series 1, episode 1 |
| 2022 | Shakespeare & Hathaway: Private Investigators | Edie Brosnan | Series 4, episode 7 |
| 2022 | Drømmeren | Lady Islington | Series 1, episode 2 |
| 2023 | All the Light We Cannot See | Madame Manec | Series 1, episode 1-4 |
| 2023 | Obsession | Elizabeth | Miniseries (3 episodes) |
| 2025 | Prisoner 951 | Barbara Ratcliffe | Television mini-series |
