= Mr. Turner =

2014 film by Mike Leigh

- Theatrical film poster
- Directed by: Mike Leigh
- Written by: Mike Leigh
- Produced by: Georgina Lowe
- Starring: Timothy Spall; Dorothy Atkinson; Marion Bailey; Paul Jesson; Lesley Manville; Martin Savage
- Cinematography: Dick Pope
- Edited by: Jon Gregory
- Music by: Gary Yershon
- Production companies: Film4; Focus Features International; Lipsync Productions; Thin Man Films; Xofa Productions
- Distributed by: Entertainment One (United Kingdom); Diaphana Films (France); Prokino Filmverleih; 20th Century Fox (Germany)
- Release dates: 15 May 2014 (Cannes); 31 December 2014 (United Kingdom)
- Running time: 150 minutes
- Countries: United Kingdom; France; Germany
- Language: English
- Budget: $14 million
- Box office: $25.2 million

Mr. Turner is a 2014 biographical drama film based on the last 25 years of the life of artist J. M. W. Turner (1775–1851). Written and directed by Mike Leigh, the film stars Timothy Spall in the title role, with Dorothy Atkinson, Paul Jesson, Marion Bailey, Lesley Manville, and Martin Savage. Leigh called Turner "a great artist: a radical, revolutionary painter", and said, "I felt there was scope for a film examining the tension between this very mortal, flawed individual, and the epic work, the spiritual way he had of distilling the world".

Mr. Turner premiered in competition for the Palme d'Or at the 2014 Cannes Film Festival, where Spall won the award for Best Actor and Dick Pope received a special jury prize for the film's cinematography. The film was critically acclaimed and received four nominations each at the 87th Academy Awards and 68th British Academy Film Awards. Its soundtrack, by Gary Yerson, was also nominated for multiple awards.

== Plot ==
Profoundly affected by the death of his father, loved by his housekeeper, Hannah Danby, whom he takes for granted and occasionally uses sexually, painter J. M. W. Turner forms a close and loving relationship with a seaside landlady, Mrs. Booth, with whom he eventually lives incognito in Chelsea.

Turner travels, paints, stays with the country aristocracy, visits a brothel, is a popular if anarchic member of the Royal Academy of Arts, has himself strapped to the mast of a ship so that he can paint a snowstorm, and is both celebrated and reviled by the public and by royalty.

The story recreates the memorable occasion during the Royal Academy Exhibition of 1832 when Turner's seascape Helvoetsluys was placed next to Constable's The Opening of Waterloo Bridge seen from Whitehall. Seeing how the muted tones of his own painting paled next to Constable's vibrant work, in a quick stroke Turner adds a smear of red paint representing a buoy. Recognising Turner's genius, Constable says, "He's been here and fired a gun."

== Cast ==
- Timothy Spall as J. M. W. Turner: The controversial artist; he never married but had two lovers. He fathered two children with one, though he denied paternity.
- Dorothy Atkinson as Hannah Danby: Turner's devoted housekeeper for 40 years, whom he exploits sexually. Leigh said that the sexual relationship was "an invention not based on any historical evidence". She suffered from the skin disease psoriasis and died two years after Turner.
- Marion Bailey as Sophia Booth: Turner's landlady and lover, twice widowed, with one son by her first husband. After her second husband died, she became involved with Turner.
- Paul Jesson as William Turner Snr: Turner's father, a barber. His wife died young in a mental hospital, and their only other child died at 5. He lived with his artist son until his death, which deeply affected Turner.
- Lesley Manville as Mary Somerville, a scientist and friend of Turner. She gained renown at a time when women engaging seriously in scientific study was not condoned.
- Martin Savage as Benjamin Robert Haydon: Turner's friend, an artist who committed suicide.
- Ruth Sheen as Sarah Danby: Hannah's aunt by marriage and Turner's first lover and the mother of his two unacknowledged daughters. Her husband and Hannah's uncle, a musician, had died, leaving her a young widow.
- David Horovitch as Dr Price: Turner's doctor
- Karl Johnson as Mr. Booth, a sea captain and second husband of Sophia Booth
- Peter Wight as Joseph Gillott: wealthy arts patron
- Joshua McGuire as John Ruskin
- Stuart McQuarrie as Ruskin's father
- Sylvestra Le Touzel as Ruskin's mother
- Leo Bill as J. E. Mayall: pioneering photographer
- Kate O'Flynn as Prostitute: Eliza is the young prostitute sketched by Turner.
- Sinead Matthews as Queen Victoria: the young queen who sneers at Turner's later work.
- Karina Fernandez as Miss Coggins: musician who plays Dido's Lament by Henry Purcell, to Turner's singing.
- Richard Bremmer as George Jones: artist famous for battle scenes
- Mark Stanley as Clarkson Stanfield: marine painter
- Jamie Thomas King as David Roberts: Scottish Orientalist painter
- Tom Wlaschiha as Prince Albert
- Patrick Godfrey as Lord Egremont: arts patron (such as Carew) and owner of Petworth House where Turner spent much time.
- Niall Buggy as John Carew: Irish sculptor
- Fred Pearson as Sir William Beechy: portrait painter
- Tom Edden as C. R. Leslie: genre painter
- Clive Francis as Martin Archer Shee: portrait painter
- Robert Portal as Sir Charles Eastlake: painter and gallery director
- James Fleet as John Constable: landscape painter, doyen of the Romantic movement
- Nicholas Jones as Sir John Soane: neo-classical architect and art collector
- Roger Ashton-Griffiths as Henry William Pickersgill: portrait painter
- Simon Chandler as Sir Augustus Wall Callcott: landscape artist
- Edward de Souza as Thomas Stothard: painter and engraver
- Oliver Maltman as theatre actor
- Sam Kelly as theatre actor

== Production ==
The original screenplay was written by Mike Leigh with research by historian Jacqueline Riding. Mr. Turner was filmed in several locations around the UK. Margate was not used to represent Turner's Margate, which was filmed at Kingsand in Cornwall. The production visited Kent to shoot a couple of scenes. Wentworth Woodhouse in Rotherham stood in for the Royal Academy in London, with the production crew meticulously recreating the way the paintings of the era were displayed. HMS Gannet in the Historic Dockyard Chatham was used in the scene where Turner has himself strapped to the mast of a sailing ship during a storm. Stangate Creek doubled as the Thames when Turner and his friends are rowed along the Thames and discuss HMS Victory, then toast HMS Temeraire.

== Release ==
Mr. Turner had its premiere at the 2014 Cannes Film Festival, where it competed for the Palme d'Or, with Spall winning Best Actor and Dick Pope winning the Vulcan Award. Entertainment One released the film in the United Kingdom on 31 December 2014. Sony Pictures Classics handled the United States distribution, with a release date of 19 December 2014. It was screened in the Special Presentations section of the 2014 Toronto International Film Festival.

=== Piracy ===
The film was leaked by the hacker group "Guardians of Peace" onto peer-to-peer file-sharing websites on 27 November 2014, more than three weeks ahead of its intended U.S. theatrical release, as part of the Sony Pictures Entertainment hack. Along with it came Fury and three other then unreleased Sony Pictures films (Annie, Still Alice and To Write Love on Her Arms). Within three days of the initial leak, an estimated 63,379 unique IPs had downloaded Mr. Turner.

== Critical reception ==
On Rotten Tomatoes, the film has an approval rating of 97% based on 196 reviews, with an average rating of 8.4/10. The site's critical consensus reads: "Led by a masterful performance from Timothy Spall and brilliantly directed by Mike Leigh, Mr. Turner is a superior Hollywood biopic." On Metacritic, the film has a weighted average score of 94 out of 100 based on 44 critics, indicating "universal acclaim".

Critic Katie Kilkenny of The Atlantic called it "a gorgeous, important film". Observer critic Mark Kermode described the film as a "portrait of a man wrestling light with his hands as if it were a physical element: tangible, malleable, corporeal". Slate reviewer Dana Stevens wrote, "Writing about Mr. Turner a few weeks after seeing it, I feel a craving to be again immersed in its world, which is rich with colors, textures, and, it sometimes almost seems, smells".

The consonance between the film and its subject was addressed by Sir Nicholas Serota, director of the Tate Galleries in England: “Mike Leigh and Timothy Spall’s great achievement is showing us how the artist approached the physical business of painting. But they also convey the spirit of a man whose reputation as a curmudgeon is unwarranted, given his passionate interest in people and the world around him. There is a great humanitarian streak in Turner and Mike Leigh has found a way of capturing this on film, as he has done so often before.”

Matt Zoller Seitz of RogerEbert.com gave the film three and a half out of four, writing that like Leigh's 1999 film Topsy-Turvy, about the creation of Gilbert and Sullivan's comic opera The Mikado, "[Mr. Turner] understands creative people on every conceivable level, and translates that understanding with a deftness rarely seen outside of astute documentaries about creative people. To watch it is to feel as though you're a part of its world... experiencing tiny fluctuations in received wisdom and sudden changes of artistic direction that can only be sensed by professionals who are plugged into their art form, and completely in command of their talents."

== Accolades ==
List of awards and nominations
Award / Film Festival	Category	Recipient(s)	Result
87th Academy Awards	Best Cinematography	Dick Pope	Nominated
87th Academy Awards	Best Costume Design	Jacqueline Durran	Nominated
87th Academy Awards	Best Original Score	Gary Yershon	Nominated
87th Academy Awards	Best Production Design	Suzie Davies, Charlotte Watts	Nominated
29th ASC Awards	Theatrical Motion Picture	Dick Pope	Nominated
23rd Britannia Awards	Excellence in Directing	Mike Leigh	Won
68th British Academy Film Awards	Best Cinematography	Dick Pope	Nominated
68th British Academy Film Awards	Best Production Design	Suzie Davies, Charlotte Watts	Nominated
68th British Academy Film Awards	Best Costume Design	Jacqueline Durran	Nominated
68th British Academy Film Awards	Best Makeup & Hair	Christine Blundell, Lesa Warrener	Nominated
17th British Independent Film Awards	Best British Independent Film	Mr. Turner	Nominated
17th British Independent Film Awards	Best Director	Mike Leigh	Nominated
17th British Independent Film Awards	Best Actor	Timothy Spall	Nominated
17th British Independent Film Awards	Best Supporting Actress	Dorothy Atkinson	Nominated
17th British Independent Film Awards	Best Technical Achievement	Dick Pope	Nominated
67th Cannes Film Festival	Best Actor	Timothy Spall	Won
67th Cannes Film Festival	Vulcan Award	Dick Pope	Won
67th Cannes Film Festival	Palme d'Or	Mike Leigh	Nominated
34th Hawaii International Film Festival	EuroCinema Hawai'i Award for Best Film	Mr. Turner	Won
35th London Film Critics' Circle Awards	Film of the Year	Mr. Turner	Nominated
35th London Film Critics' Circle Awards	British Film of the Year	Mr. Turner	Nominated
35th London Film Critics' Circle Awards	Actor of the Year	Timothy Spall	Nominated
35th London Film Critics' Circle Awards	Supporting Actress of the Year	Marion Bailey	Nominated
35th London Film Critics' Circle Awards	British Actor of the Year	Timothy Spall	Won
35th London Film Critics' Circle Awards	Director of the Year	Mike Leigh	Nominated
35th London Film Critics' Circle Awards	Technical Achievement Award	Dick Pope	Nominated
86th National Board of Review Awards	Top 10 Independent Films	Mr. Turner	Won
49th National Society of Film Critics Awards	Best Actor	Timothy Spall	Won
80th New York Film Critics Circle Awards	Best Actor	Timothy Spall	Won
