= Karl Johnson (actor) =

Welsh actor (born 1948)

- Born: 1 March 1948 (age 78); Wales
- Occupation: Actor
- Karl Johnson's voice Johnson describing his favourite pub The Pineapple in Kentish Town for the VocalEyes podcast London Beyond Sight, 1 October 2012.

Karl Johnson (born 1 March 1948) is a Welsh actor, who has worked on stage, film and television. His notable roles to date include the title role in Derek Jarman's 1993 film Wittgenstein, and those of Cato the Younger in the television drama series Rome and of Twister Turrill in the BBC costume drama Lark Rise to Candleford.

== Filmography ==
=== Film ===
- Jubilee (1978) - Sphinx
- The Tempest (1979) - Ariel, an airy spirit
- Prick Up Your Ears (1987) - Douglas Orton
- A Prayer for the Dying (1987) - Fitzgerald
- Close My Eyes (1991) - Colin
- Let Him Have It (1991) - Parris
- Wittgenstein (1993) - Ludwig Wittgenstein
- Love Is the Devil: Study for a Portrait of Francis Bacon (1998) - John Deakin
- Tomorrow La Scala (2002) - Sydney
- Pure (2002) - Grandad
- Frozen (2005) - Coastguard Bill
- Heidi (2005) - Old Man
- The Illusionist (2006) - Doctor / Old Man
- Copying Beethoven (2006) - Stefan Holtz
- Four Last Songs (2007) - Erico
- Hot Fuzz (2007) - PC Bob Walker
- The Edge of Love (2008) - Dai Fred (uncredited)
- Is Anybody There? (2008) - Arthur (uncredited)
- I Know You Know (2008) - Ernie
- Third Star (2010) - Ticket Seller
- Frankenstein (2011) - de Lacey
- The Pier (2011) - Larry McCarthy
- The Deep Blue Sea (2011) - Mr Miller
- Good Vibrations (2012) - George Hooley
- The Sea (2013) - Blunden
- Mr Turner (2014) - Mr Booth
- Hamlet (2015) - Ghost of Hamlet's Father / Gravedigger
- The Carer (2016) - Joseph
- Kaleidoscope (2016) - John
- Winter Thaw (2016) - Stepanovich
- The Death of Stalin (2017) - Dr. Lukomsky
- Peterloo (2018) - Lord Sidmouth, the Home Secretary
- King Lear (2018) - The Fool
- Dream Horse (2020) - Kerby

=== Television ===
- Rainbow (1973–1974) - Karl, part of the music trio
- Sons and Lovers (1981) - Paul Morel
- A Tale of Two Cities (1989) - Barsad
- Rules of Engagement - Dave Gillespie
- The Bill (1989–2004) - Jon Jennings / Len Rogers / Geoff Hallwood / D.I. Osborne
- Agatha Christie's Poirot (1993, TV Series, 1 episode: Jewel Robbery at the Grand Metropolitan) - Saunders
- Catherine the Great (1995, TV Movie) - Sheshkovsky
- An Independent Man (1995) - Bill Rutherford
- The Temptation of Franz Schubert (1997, TV Movie) - Doctor
- Wing and a Prayer (1997)
- Vanity Fair (1998) - Major Loder
- David Copperfield (1999) - Tungay
- Without Motive (2000–2001) - Robert Jackson
- Born and Bred (2003) - Alec Rossendale
- The Mayor of Casterbridge (2003, TV Movie) - Fall
- When I'm 64 (2004, TV Movie) - Billy
- Dalziel and Pascoe: Soft Touch (2004) - Stevie Earle
- Midsomer Murders (2005) - Derek Lockwood
- Rome (2005–2007) - Marcus Porcius Cato
- The Chatterley Affair (2006, TV Movie) - Mr. Justice Byrne
- Nostradamus (2006, TV Movie)
- Elizabeth David: A Life in Recipes (2006) - Norman Douglas
- New Tricks (2006) - Gary Kendall
- Ancient Rome: The Rise and Fall of an Empire (2006) - Marcellus
- As You Like It (2006)
- Lark Rise to Candleford (2008–2011) - Twister Turrill
- Small Island (2009) - Arthur Bligh
- Merlin (2010) - Taliesin
- Call the Midwife (2013) - Mr. Masterson
- Plebs (2014) - Judge
- Why We Went to War (2015)
- Lovesick (2016) - Richard
- Mum (2016–2019) - Reg
- King Lear (2018, TV Movie) - Fool
- Ray's Daze
- Halo (2022) - Truth
- Truelove (TV series) (2024) - Tom
- Death Valley (British TV series) (2025) - Dennis Williams

== Selected stage career ==
- The Seafarer, as James 'Sharky' Harkin, National Theatre, London
- Tales From The Vienna Woods, National Theatre, London
- Scenes from the Big Picture, National Theatre, London
- Hamlet, National Theatre, London
- The Walls, National Theatre, London
- Cardiff East, National Theatre, London
- The Ends of the Earth, National Theatre, London
- Machine Wreckers, National Theatre, London
- The Shape of The Table, National Theatre, London
- Black Snow, National Theatre, London
- Golden Boy, National Theatre, London
- The Resistible Rise of Arturo Ui, National Theatre, London
- The Sea, National Theatre, London
- Uncle Vanya, National Theatre, London
- Don Quixote, National Theatre, London
- A Midsummer Night's Dream, National Theatre, London
- The Fawn, National Theatre, London
- Glengarry Glen Ross, National Theatre, London
- Wild Honey, National Theatre, London
- The Rivals, National Theatre, London
- The Mysteries, National Theatre, London
- Animal Farm, National Theatre, London
- Almost Nothing/At The Table, Royal Court Theatre, London
- Not Not Not Not Not Enough Oxygen, Royal Court Theatre, London
- This Is A Chair, Royal Court Theatre, London
- The Night Heron, Royal Court Theatre, London
- Boy Gets Girl, Royal Court Theatre, London
- The Weir, Royal Court Theatre, London
- Been So Long, Royal Court Theatre, London
- Just a Little Less Than Normal, Royal Court Theatre, London
- Sudlow's Dawn, Royal Court Theatre, London
- Irish Eyes and English Tears, Royal Court Theatre, London
- In The Company of Men, Royal Shakespeare Company, Stratford
- TV Times, Royal Shakespeare Company, Stratford
- Knight of the Burning Pestle, Royal Shakespeare Company, Stratford
- Amadeus, Peter Hall Company
- The Country Wife, Centreline Productions
- The Last Yankee, Leicester Haymarket
- Woyzeck, Foco Novo at Lyric Hammersmith
- War Crimes, ICA
- The Dresser, Leatherhead
- Hedda Gabler, Yvonne Arnaud Guildford
- Much Ado About Nothing, Open Air Theatre, Regent's Park
- As You Like It, Old Vic
- Vieux Carre, West End
- Frankenstein, National Theatre, London
- Barking in Essex, Wyndham's Theatre
- The Cherry Orchard, St. Ann's Warehouse
