= Mum (TV series) =

British television series

- Genre: Sitcom
- Created by: Stefan Golaszewski
- Written by: Stefan Golaszewski
- Directed by: Richard Laxton; Stefan Golaszewski
- Starring: Lesley Manville; Peter Mullan; Sam Swainsbury; Lisa McGrillis; Dorothy Atkinson; Ross Boatman; Karl Johnson; Marlene Sidaway
- Opening theme: When I'm Gone (Carter Family song) by Lulu and the Lampshades
- Country of origin: United Kingdom
- Original language: English
- No. of series: 3
- No. of episodes: 18 (list of episodes)

Production
- Running time: 30 minutes
- Production company: Big Talk Productions

Original release
- Network: BBC Two
- Release: 13 May 2016 – 19 June 2019

Mum is a British sitcom written by Stefan Golaszewski that centred on the recently widowed, suburban 59-year-old Cathy (played by Lesley Manville) and her family, following her husband's death, airing on BBC Two from 2016–2019. Each episode is named after a calendar month in the year, except series three which is set over just one week. The series features Cathy's supportive lifelong friend, Michael (played by Peter Mullan), and her family: son Jason and his girlfriend, Kelly; Cathy's brother, Derek, and his new partner, Pauline; and Cathy's in-laws.

In June 2016, the BBC announced that a second series had been commissioned. In October 2017, it was recommissioned for a third series. The second series premiered on 20 February 2018. Lisa McGrillis revealed that the third series would be the last; it premiered on 15 May 2019.

== Cast ==
Main

- Lesley Manville as Cathy Walker
- Peter Mullan as Michael Roberts, Cathy and her late husband Dave's friend
- Sam Swainsbury as Jason Walker, Cathy's son
- Lisa McGrillis as Kelly, Jason's girlfriend
- Ross Boatman as Derek Evans, Cathy's brother
- Dorothy Atkinson as Pauline, Derek's partner
- Karl Johnson as Reg Walker, Cathy's father-in-law
- Marlene Sidaway as Maureen Walker, Cathy's mother-in-law

Recurring

- Tanya Franks as Carol, Kelly's mum
- Seline Hizli as Debbie, Kelly's cousin
- Aaron Heffernan as Ryan, Debbie's boyfriend
- Daniela Denby-Ashe as Claire

Guest

- Matthew Aubrey as Sam
- Ray Emmet Brown as John
- Kika Mirylees as Lyn
- Grace Hogg-Robinson as Danielle Evans, Derek's daughter
- Prasanna Puwanarajah as Kumar

== Episodes ==
Series	Episodes	Originally released	
Series	Episodes	First released	Last released
1	6	13 May 2016	17 June 2016
2	6	20 February 2018	27 March 2018
3	6	15 May 2019	19 June 2019

== Production ==
The interior shots of Cathy's house for both series 1 and 2 were filmed at West London Film Studios. The show's exteriors were filmed at 53 Kenilworth Drive in Croxley Green, Hertfordshire. Series 3 was filmed on location at a country house in Dorking, Surrey.

== Broadcast ==
Series 3 was shown on BBC Two on Wednesday nights starting 15 May 2019, with all six episodes being released on BBC iPlayer on the same night as the first episode.

Internationally, the series premiered on BBC First on 11 October 2016. The series premiered in New Zealand on TVNZ 1 on 20 July 2016. The U.S. premiere was 1 July 2018 on PBS, and in France and Germany on Arte

== Reception ==
=== Critical reception ===
Critical response of Mum
Season	Rotten Tomatoes
1	100% (7 reviews)
2	100% (17 reviews)
3	100% (9 reviews)

Mum has received critical acclaim. On Rotten Tomatoes, the first series holds an approval rating of 100% based on reviews from seven critics. Reviewers were somewhat critical towards the first episode: in a review for The Guardian, Sam Wollaston compared it to the BBC Three sitcom Him & Her in terms of its writing, and slightly criticised the show, saying Him & Her was "ruder, more visceral, sexier and – vital for a comedy – funnier." On his most positive note, he mentioned, "this is a bit more grown-up, (more BBC2 than 3)," and gave the series a positive review, saying "it shares the same subtlety and warmth." He praised the cast performances, saying "the characters are believable [and] three-dimensional ones," and gave recognition in particular to both Lesley Manville and Lisa McGrillis. Ceri Radford of The Daily Telegraph rated the series 3 out of 5, and commented that episode one was "soothing and enjoyable, but lacks real bite."

Series two received a more positive reception overall and holds a rating of 100% on Rotten Tomatoes based on 17 reviews. The website's Critical Consensus reads that "Mum's patient pacing and unflinching embrace of agonizingly awkward family dynamics can make it a difficult watch, but Lesley Manville and Peter Mullan's heartfelt and keenly observed performances make it a highly rewarding experience, too." In a review for the website There Ought to Be Clowns, Ian Foster expressed delight in the series' return, stating, "A hugely successful return for Stefan Golaszewski’s BBC sitcom Mum, with world-beater Lesley Manville in brilliant form once again." Following the series finale, Sarah Highes of The Guardian praised the series and mentioned that "few programmes celebrate humanity, in all its complexity, so clearly" and that "this is a comedy that understands that every aspect of life is worth cherishing."

The third and final series holds a rating of 100% on Rotten Tomatoes based on nine reviews. The Guardian's Jack Seale rated the series 5 out of 5 and commented on the show's acclaimed final episode, calling it, "magnificent TV that will put sunshine in your heart" and stating that the show is "guaranteed to make you cry four times every episode, the final series of the Lesley Manville sitcom miraculously turns tiny gestures into epic romance." Gabriel Tate of The Daily Telegraph gave the show a 5 out of 5 rating and stated, "a perfect end to a perfect show–bring on the Baftas".

=== Awards and nominations ===
Year	Award	Category	Nominee	Result	Ref.
2016	Royal Television Society Craft & Design Awards	Director – Comedy Drama/Situation Comedy	Richard Laxton	Nominated	
2017	British Academy Television Award	Best Female Comedy Performance	Lesley Manville	Nominated	
2017	British Academy Television Craft Awards	Best Writer – Comedy	Stefan Golaszewski	Won	
2017	Broadcasting Press Guild Awards	Best Comedy	Mum	Won	
2017	Royal Television Society Programme Awards	Writer – Comedy	Stefan Golaszewski	Nominated	
2019	British Academy Television Awards	Best Scripted Comedy	Mum	Nominated	
2019	British Academy Television Awards	Best Female Comedy Performance	Lesley Manville	Nominated	
2019	British Academy Television Awards	Best Male Comedy Performance	Peter Mullan	Nominated	
2019	British Academy Television Craft Awards	Best Writer – Comedy	Stefan Golaszewski	Nominated	
2019	Royal Television Society Programme Awards	Comedy Performance – Female	Lesley Manville	Won	
2019	Royal Television Society Programme Awards	Writer – Comedy	Stefan Golaszewski	Won	
2020	Broadcasting Press Guild Awards	Best Comedy	Mum	Nominated	

== Home media ==
Series	Release date			# Discs	Rating		Ref.
Series	Region 1	Region 2	Region 4	# Discs	BBFC	ACB	Ref.
1	15 May 2018	26 February 2018	TBA	1	15	—N/a	
2	9 April 2019	2 April 2018	TBA	1	15	—N/a	
1–2	TBA	1 October 2018	6 June 2018	2	15	M	
3	TBA	24 June 2019	9 October 2019	1	15	M	
1–3	TBA	24 June 2019	TBA	3	15	—N/a	
