= Nasty Neighbours =

1999 comedy film

- Directed by: Debbie Isitt
- Screenplay by: Debbie Isitt
- Produced by: Christine Alderson
- Starring: Ricky Tomlinson; Marion Bailey; Phil Daniels; Rachel Fielding
- Cinematography: Sam McCurdy; Simon Reeves
- Edited by: Nicky Ager
- Music by: Jocelyn Pook
- Release date: 1999
- Language: English

Nasty Neighbours is a 1999 British black comedy film written and directed by Debbie Isitt, in her feature directorial debut. It premiered at the 56th Venice International Film Festival, in the New Territories section.

== Cast ==
- Ricky Tomlinson as Harold Peach
- Marion Bailey as Jean Peach
- Phil Daniels as Robert Chapman
- Rachel Fielding as Ellen Chapman
- Hywel Bennett as the Boss
- Dawn Butler as the travel agent
- Nick Whitfield as the estate agent
- Debbie Isitt as Pauline Peach
- Gordon Coulson as Stan
- Freda Barratt as Mrs. Haygarth
- Trevor Byfield as the car salesman

== Release ==
The film had its world premiere at the 56th edition of the Venice Film Festival, in the New Territories section. It premiered in British cinemas on 20 October 2000.

== Reception ==
Variety's critic David Rooney described the film as "veering recklessly between British sitcom, social realism and violent grotesquness", with "a faint echo of Mike Leigh's High Hopes". Philip Kemp from Sight and Sound referred to it as predictable, yet "watchable and diverting" thanks to the cast. Time Out praised Isitt, who "has an eye for absurdity and an ear for understated comic dialogue", but also noted "neither spoof documentary nor conventional drama, however, the film can't quite decide what it wants to be, and the result is somewhat bewildering." The Guardian's critic Rob Mackie wrote: "while Nasty Neighbours starts out like a small-scale, small-screen affair, the style careers out of control along with its characters and makes it sporadically memorable and hard to predict."
