= The Pineapple, Kentish Town =

Pub in London, England

Coordinates: 51°33′11″N 0°08′23″W

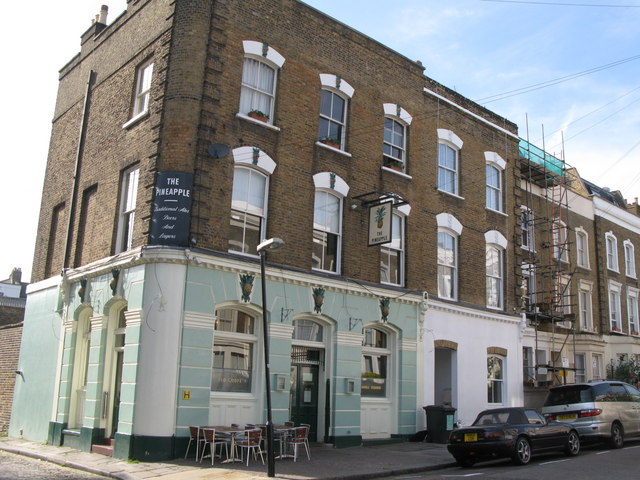
The Pineapple

Audio description of the pub by Karl Johnson

The Pineapple is a Grade II listed public house at 51 Leverton Street, Kentish Town, London.

It was built in about 1868.
