= Martin Savage (actor) =

English actor

Martin Savage is an English film, stage and television actor.

He appeared in both series of Ricky Gervais and Stephen Merchant's television series Extras as camp scriptwriter Damon Beesley and in The Thick of It television series specials as Nick Hanway. Savage's film credits include a major role as a Victorian actor in Gilbert and Sullivan operettas, George Grossmith, in the Mike Leigh film Topsy-Turvy (1999). He has also appeared in Leigh's films All or Nothing (2002), Another Year (2010), Mr. Turner (2014) and Peterloo (2018). Other major film appearances include V for Vendetta (2006), Rush (2013), and as Warden Hodges in Dad's Army (2016). He appeared in a small cameo as the performer Dan Leno in a BBC drama about music hall star Marie Lloyd and in the final Masterpiece Mystery Foyle's War. In the United States, he appeared in three episodes of Family Guy from 2006 to 2009.

His theatre credits include For King and Country (2009), A Respectable Wedding at the Young Vic (2007), Rupert Goold's Faustus (2004), an RSC production of A Midsummer Night's Dream (2002), Svejk at the Gate Theatre, London (1999), and Two (1997).

Savage is married to actress Dorothy Atkinson; the couple have one son.
