= Peterloo (film) =

2018 film directed by Mike Leigh

- Theatrical release poster
- Directed by: Mike Leigh
- Written by: Mike Leigh
- Produced by: Georgina Lowe
- Starring: Rory Kinnear; Maxine Peake; Pearce Quigley
- Cinematography: Dick Pope
- Edited by: Jon Gregory
- Music by: Gary Yershon
- Production companies: Film4; BFI; Thin Man Films
- Distributed by: Entertainment One
- Release dates: 1 September 2018 (Venice); 2 November 2018 (United Kingdom)
- Running time: 154 minutes
- Country: United Kingdom
- Language: English
- Budget: $18 million
- Box office: $2.2 million

Peterloo is a 2018 British historical drama film written and directed by Mike Leigh. Based on the Peterloo Massacre of 1819, it stars Rory Kinnear, Maxine Peake, and Pearce Quigley.

The film was selected to be screened in the main competition section of the 75th Venice International Film Festival. The film received its UK premiere on 17 October 2018, as part of the BFI London Film Festival, at HOME in Manchester. The screening marked the first time that the festival had held a premiere outside London. Leigh said he was delighted that Peterloo would be premiered "where it happened". It was released in the United Kingdom on 2 November 2018, by Entertainment One and in the United States on 5 April 2019, by Amazon Studios.

== Background ==
The film Peterloo marks the 200th anniversary of the notorious Peterloo Massacre. On 16 August 1819, a crowd of some 60,000 people from Manchester and surrounding towns gathered in St Peter's Fields to demand Parliamentary reform and an extension of voting rights. At that time, Manchester had no members of parliament of its own while the whole of Lancashire was represented by two county MPs and middle and working class men and all women were denied voting rights.

The meeting was peaceful but the armed government militias charged the crowd on the pretext of an attempt to arrest a leader of the meeting. The behaviour of the crowd and number of casualties were disputed but as many as 18 people were killed and up to 700 wounded. After the massacre the government immediately launched a crackdown on public assembly and electoral reforms on the pretext that the country was heading towards armed rebellion. The outcry led to the founding of the Manchester Guardian and played a significant role in the passage through Parliament of the Great Reform Act which extended the franchise to 'head of household' middle-class men.

== Plot ==
After the Battle of Waterloo, Joseph returns home from service in the Duke of Wellington's army to Manchester and his close-knit working class family headed by parents Joshua and Nellie. Joshua, son Robert, daughter Mary, and daughter-in-law Esther all earn a living by manual labour in a cotton mill. An economic depression makes work impossible for the traumatised Joseph to find and threatens the family's livelihood. The family is sympathetic to the campaigns for equal civil and political rights for all men and against the Corn Laws that prevent them from buying cheaper imported grain. Joshua, Joseph, and Robert attend political meetings where local activists including John Knight, Samuel Bamford and John Bagguley speak out against the system of government that is elected only by the upper class and aristocracy; Nellie attends a meeting of the Manchester Female Reform Society. The local authorities, led by magistrates Colonel Fletcher, Reverend William Robert Hay, Reverend Charles Ethelston and Mr. Norris and Deputy Chief Constable Nadin, spy on the movement and wait for an excuse to arrest its leaders. The Home Secretary, Lord Sidmouth, is determined to suppress what they term 'radical' politics. When a disgruntled Londoner smashes the window of the Prince Regent's coach, Sidmouth uses this as a pretext for suspending habeas corpus.

Bamford and his friend Joseph Healey travel south to London to hear the famous activist Henry 'Orator' Hunt speak at a political meeting. Hunt has a reputation for vanity but Bamford persuades Manchester businessman Joseph Johnson to invite Hunt to address a mass meeting at St Peter's Fields; the Home Office discovers this invitation by intercepting Johnson's letter. Arriving at Manchester, Hunt goes into hiding in Johnson's home. Richards, a Home Office spy, is able to provoke Bagguley and fellow activists Drummond and Johnston into publicly calling for armed insurrection, leading to their arrest and imprisonment. The magistrates plan to disperse Hunt's meeting and make an example of the attendees using the local mounted militia, the Manchester and Salford Yeomanry and a regular army detachment led by General John Byng. Hunt remains certain that he can lead a peaceful rally and sidelines Bamford, when he warns of the likelihood of brutal treatment by the authorities.

On the day of the meeting, thousands of people walk into Manchester from the surrounding towns to hear Hunt speak at St Peter's Fields, including Nellie and Joshua and their family. Bamford leads a procession from Middleton but leaves in disgust on finding that it has been arranged that only Hunt will be allowed to address the crowd. A special committee of magistrates, chaired by Mr. Hulton has been assembled to break up the event. They appear to be in an upstairs room overlooking the gathering crowd. Norris, who urges restraint, is overruled. Byng has left his deputy in command of the soldiers, to attend a horse racing meet.

Once Hunt begins to speak, Reverend Ethelston instructs the crowd to disperse and reads them the Riot Act.

The crowd does not disperse and the Yeomanry cavalry assault the peaceful assembly with sabres drawn, while Hunt and Johnson are arrested by Nadin's men. The crowd are unable to escape the army and militia resulting in several people killed and many more injured. Joseph is wounded with a sabre and later dies. The attending reporters furiously return to their newspapers to expose this atrocity, coining a mocking name for it, "The Massacre of Peterloo". Despite the massacre, the Prince Regent sends his congratulations to the magistrates for suppressing 'radicalism' and restoring "tranquility".

== Cast ==
- Rory Kinnear as Henry Hunt
- Maxine Peake as Nellie
- Pearce Quigley as Joshua
- David Moorst as Joseph
- Rachel Finnegan as Mary
- Tom Meredith as Robert
- Simona Bitmate as Esther
- Robert Wilfort as Lord Liverpool the Prime Minister
- Karl Johnson as Lord Sidmouth the Home Secretary
- Sam Troughton as Mr. Hobhouse
- Roger Sloman as Mr. Grout
- Liam Gerrard as Jacob Flather
- Kenneth Hadley as Mr. Golightly
- Tom Edward-Kane as Mr. Cob
- Lizzy McInnerny as Mrs. Moss
- Alastair Mackenzie as General Sir John Byng
- Neil Bell as Samuel Bamford
- Lisa Millett as Jemima Bamford
- Philip Jackson as John Knight
- John Paul Hurley as John Thacker Saxton
- Tom Gill as Joseph Johnson
- Lizzie Frain as Mrs. Johnson
- Harry Hepple as James Wroe
- Ian Mercer as "Dr" Joseph Healey
- Adam Long as Wroe's Printer
- Nico Mirallegro as John Bagguley
- Danny Kirrane as Samuel Drummond
- Johnny Byrom as John Johnston
- Victor McGuire as Deputy Chief Constable Nadin
- Stephen Wight as Oliver the spy
- Ryan Pope as Chippendale the spy
- Dorothy Atkinson as Singing weaver
- Tim McInnerny as the Prince Regent
- Marion Bailey as Lady Conyngham
- Vincent Franklin as Magistrate Rev. Ethelston
- Jeff Rawle as Magistrate Rev. Hay
- Eileen Davies as Mrs. Hay
- Philip Whitchurch as Magistrate Col. Fletcher
- Martin Savage as Magistrate Norris
- Al Weaver as Magistrate Hulton
- David Bamber as Magistrate Rev. Mallory
- David Fielder as Magistrate Rev. Gutteridge
- Fine Time Fontayne as Magistrate Clowes
- Robert Gillespie as Magistrate Warmley
- Jonathan Jaynes as Magistrate Tatton
- Nicholas Lumley as Magistrate Rev. Perryn
- Shaun Prendergast as Magistrate Bolt
- Alan Williams as Magistrate Marriott
- Dorothy Duffy as Mary Fildes
- Victoria Moseley as Susannah Saxton
- Christine Bottomley as Female reformer
- Samantha Edwards as Female reformer
- Julie Hesmondhalgh as Female reformer
- Kate Rutter as Female reformer
- Katie West as Female reformer
- Joseph Kloska as Richard Carlile
- Leo Bill as John Tyas
- Brian Fletcher as Edward Baines
- Gary Cargill as John Smith
- Patrick Kennedy as Colonel L'Estrange
- Guy Williams as Lieutenant Col. Dalrymple
- Michael Chadwick as 15th Hussar
- Tristram Davies as 15th Hussar
- Oliver Devoti as 15th Hussar
- Dan Poole as 15th Hussar
- Charlie Tighe as 15th Hussar
- Ben Crompton as Tuke, the painter
- Bryony Miller as Bessie
- Lee Boardman as Nadin's Constable
- Steve Garti as Nadin's Constable
- Michael Culkin as a Lord
- Rachel Davies as Pie buyer
- Kieran O'Brien as Farrier
- Noreen Kershaw as Drunken servant
- Bob Goody as Outraged reformer
- Debbie Harding as Quizzical lady

== Production ==
Filming began in May 2017. Production shot the interior of the Tarred Yarn Store in Plymouth, Devon, and the exterior of the Ropery at the Chatham Historic Dockyard in Kent to double as a cotton mill in Manchester. St Mary's Marshes on the Isle of Grain also appears in a short scene at the beginning of the film, when a lonely figure is seen walking along the marshes.

Much of the dialogue is in traditional Lancashire dialect. To achieve this, the director used the book The Dialects of South Lancashire, which was written by the same Samuel Bamford who is portrayed in the film.

== Reception ==
On review aggregator Rotten Tomatoes, the film holds an approval rating of 66%, based on 161 reviews with an average rating of 6.5/10. The website's critical consensus reads, "Peterloo proves writer-director Mike Leigh's populist anger remains undimmed – but that righteous fury occasionally overpowers the narrative." Metacritic gives the film a weighted average score of 66 out of 100, based on 34 critics, indicating "generally favorable reviews". The New York Times called it a "brilliant and demanding film".

The film obtained no BAFTA nominations and in this regard The Guardian’s critic noted: "Peterloo marks a rare failure for Film4".

== See also ==
- Sharpe's Justice
