= Gary Yershon =

English composer

Gary Bernard Stewart Yershon (born 2 November 1954) is an English composer. His works include music for theatre, radio, television, film, and dance. He is an Associate Artist of the Royal Shakespeare Company.

== Biography ==
Born in London, he studied Music and Drama at the University of Hull. He initially worked as an actor-musician before turning to full-time composition in 1991.

=== Theatre ===
Yershon's career began in repertory theatre, at the Duke's Playhouse, Lancaster (now The Dukes). While with the company, he was musical director of Ken Hill’s version of Phantom of the Opera. Subsequent regional work included acting in and/or composing for several verbatim documentary productions in collaboration with the writer Rony Robinson. These included Cheshire Voices (1977) and Down at Our School (1978) at the Gateway Theatre, Chester; All Our Loving (1979) at the Theatre Royal, Stratford East; and When Can I Have a Banana Again (1982) at Derby Playhouse (now Derby Theatre).

In the 1980s Yershon worked on productions with the Bristol Old Vic company including The Bristol Twins, Cinderella, The Comedy of Errors, A Streetcar Named Desire, Oliver Twist and Doña Rosita the Spinster.

In 1991 Yershon joined Phyllida Lloyd at the Royal Shakespeare Company to compose for her revival of Thomas Shadwell’s comedy The Virtuoso. He returned to the company frequently in subsequent years, including, with Lloyd, Artists and Admirers (1992); with Matthew Warchus, The Devil is an Ass (1995), Hamlet (1997) and The Winter's Tale (2002); with David Thacker, As You Like It (1992), The Merchant of Venice (1993); with Dominic Cooke, Cymbeline (2003), Pericles (2006), The Winter's Tale (2006), The Malcontent (2002), Macbeth (2004), As You Like It (2005), The Crucible (2006), Arabian Nights (2009) and Noughts and Crosses (2007).

In 1993 Yershon joined Phyllida Lloyd at the Royal National Theatre to compose for her production of Pericles. He returned to the National for further productions, including, with Lloyd, The Way of the World (1995), The Duchess of Malfi (2003); with Matthew Warchus, Volpone (1995), Buried Child (2004); with Dominic Cooke, The Comedy of Errors (2011; with Trevor Nunn, Troilus and Cressida (1999); with Fiona Shaw, Widowers’ Houses (2000); with Mike Leigh, Two Thousand Years (2005) and Grief (2011).

In 1994 Yershon was the musical director for Phyllida Lloyd's production of The Threepenny Opera at the Donmar Warehouse. Yershon also conducted the original cast album. He composed music for two subsequent productions by Lloyd for the Donmar: Boston Marriage and Julius Caesar (2012). He returned to the Donmar in 2023 to compose for Katy Rudd's premier production of Jack Thorne’s play When Winston Went to War with the Wireless.

Yershon wrote incidental music for the original English-language productions of Yasmina Reza’s plays 'Art', The Unexpected Man, Life x 3 and God of Carnage. All were directed by Matthew Warchus in translations by Christopher Hampton. Yershon also contributed songs to the first production of The Play What I Wrote (2001), directed by Kenneth Branagh; and incidental music for Matthew Warchus' 2008 revival of Alan Ayckbourn’s The Norman Conquests at the Old Vic, for which, when the production transferred to Broadway, Yershon received a Drama Desk Award nomination for Outstanding Music in a Play.

At the Royal Court Theatre, Yershon collaborated on several productions directed by Dominic Cooke. These include Fireface, Redundant, Plasticine, Rhinoceros, Chicken Soup with Barley and The Low Road (2013)

In 2022, Yershon was musical director of Roxanna Silbert's production of Nell Leyshon’s play Folk at Hampstead Theatre. In 2023 he composed for Simon Armitage’s poetic dramatisation of Hansel and Gretel at Shakespeare's Globe.

=== Film ===
For Mike Leigh, Yershon was the musical director on Topsy-Turvy (1999), and appeared on-screen as the pianist in a brothel. He was the composer for Happy-Go-Lucky (2008), Another Year (2010), A Running Jump (2012), Mr Turner (2014), Peterloo (2019) and Hard Truths (2024). Other film scores include Brighton and 23 Walks.

=== Television ===
In 1989 Yershon appeared as Jerome Kern in Wodehouse on Broadway for BBC Television. He composed the music for two series (Grampian TV 1984 and Channel 4 1998) of the animated cartoon series James the Cat. He scores two two-part dramas in ITV’s Trial and Retribution series — The Lovers (2005) and The Sins of the Father (2007). He wrote the music for 26 episodes of the animated cartoon series Ebb and Flo (Channel 5 2005).

=== Radio ===
Yershon has composed for numerous BBC Radio dramatisations, including Tiger! Tiger! (1991), The Emigrants (2001), Autumn Journal (2003), The Odyssey (2004), If Not Now, When? (2005), Sir Gawain and the Green Knight (2006), Three Men in a Boat (2013)

=== Dance ===
Yershon scores for dance include Ma vie en rose (2007) based on the film of the same name; it was performed at the Young Vic and choreographed by Ayse Tashkiran. His score for The Boy in the Striped Pyjamas (2017), based on the novel by John Boyne, was composed for Northern Ballet and choreographed by Daniel de Andrade.

=== Concert and chamber music ===
Works for chamber ensembles include two works for mixed reeds quartet, The Antrios and Des Vents; the wind quintet Ready for Anything; Lockdown Variations for solo flute; a duet for viola and cello; Islands, a trio for French horn, violin and piano. Larger works include Metamorphonie for string quartet, flute, harp, an actor and a dancer; from Brighton for accordion ensemble and percussion; Le Bonnet de Benny for clarinet ensemble and percussion; The Great Blueness, based on the story by Arnold Lobell, commissioned and premiered by the London Symphony Orchestra.

=== Other projects ===
In 1990 Yershon abridged Joseph Wechsberg’s memoir Looking for a Bluebird for BBC Radio 4.

For Alexander Pushkin's bicentenary in 1999, Yershon translated and dramatised the mock-epic Ruslan and Ludmila, and presented Alexander Pushkin: the Place of the Poet, both for Radio 3.

In 2003 Yershon wrote the book for The Water Babies, a musical for Chichester Festival Theatre based on the novel by Charles Kingsley. Music and lyrics were by Jason Carr. The director was Jeremy Sams.

In 2016-17 he hosted Oscarⓡ Scores at the Barbican cinema in London. In 2024 he co-curated, in association with L’Institut Français du Royaume Uni, a season built around the film work of French composer Georges Auric.

His published essays include Robin Hood in Cheltenham and Picturing the Composer.

Yershon is an Associate Teacher at the Royal Academy of Dramatic Art and a patron of the Denne Gilkes Memorial Fund.

=== Awards and nominations ===
Yershon was nominated for the 2009 Drama Desk Award for Outstanding Music in a Play for the Broadway revival of The Norman Conquests. In 2010 he was nominated for a European Film Award for his work on Another Year. In 2015 for the 87th Academy Awards, he received a nomination for the Academy Award for Best Original Score for his work on Mr. Turner. He has been nominated for twice at the Ivor Novello Awards, for his scores for Mr Turner (2015) and Hard Truths (2025).
