= A Running Jump =

- Written by: Mike Leigh
- Directed by: Mike Leigh
- Starring: Eddie Marsan; Samantha Spiro; Sam Kelly
- Music by: Gary Yershon
- Country of origin: United Kingdom
- Original language: English

Production
- Producers: Georgina Lowe; Ruth Mackenzie
- Cinematography: Dick Pope
- Editor: Jon Gregory
- Running time: 35 minutes
- Production companies: BBC Films; Film4

Original release
- Network: Channel 4
- Release: 23 July 2012

A Running Jump is a 2012 short film written and directed by Mike Leigh. It was commissioned for the London 2012 Cultural Olympiad and shown on both Channel 4 on Monday 23 July and BBC Two on Thursday 26 July 2012. Leigh describes it as "a film reflecting on sport in everyday life – not to mention taxis and dodgy second-hand cars."

== Cast ==
- Eddie Marsan as Perry
- Samantha Spiro as Debbie
- Sam Kelly as Grandad
- Danielle Bird as Jody
- Nichole Bird as Hayley
- Lee Ingleby as Gary
- Robert Putt as Derek
- Jade Anouka as Jody's friend
- Belinda Everett as Karate girl
- Selina Zaza as Karate girl
- Ben Batt as Footballer
- Jonny Leigh-Wright as Footballer
