= James Norris (lawyer) =

James Norris (c. 1774 – 19 January 1838) was an English lawyer, notable for his role in the Peterloo Massacre of 1819. Appointed stipendiary magistrate of Manchester in March 1818, his reports to the Home Office, describing unrest and (alleged) paramilitary activity amongst the populace, have been described as "full of excessive alarms" and may have coloured the attitude of troops sent to maintain order. Much of this correspondence was collated (with highly critical commentary) in a report to Parliament by John Edward Taylor, founder of the Manchester Guardian newspaper. Nevertheless, his career suffered little in the aftermath of the massacre, and he was appointed as Chairman of Quarter Sessions for Salford Hundred in 1825, retaining that post until his death in 1838. Despite links with the Middleforth district of Penwortham, where he inherited a mansion built by his family in the Tudor era, Norris was the only magistrate involved in the Peterloo Massacre who actually resided in Manchester at the time.
