= Cincinnati Symphony Orchestra =

American orchestra based in Ohio

Cincinnati Symphony Orchestra (CSO)
- Orchestra
- Founded: 1893
- Concert hall: Cincinnati Music Hall
- Music director: Cristian Măcelaru
- Website: www.cincinnatisymphony.org

The Cincinnati Symphony Orchestra is an American orchestra based in Cincinnati, Ohio. Its primary concert venue is Music Hall. In addition to its symphony concerts, the orchestra gives pops concerts as the Cincinnati Pops Orchestra. The Cincinnati Symphony is the resident orchestra for the Cincinnati May Festival, the Cincinnati Opera, and the Cincinnati Ballet. Additionally, the orchestra supports the Cincinnati Symphony Youth Orchestra (CSYO), a program for young musicians in grades 9 to 12.

== History ==
Several orchestras had existed in Cincinnati between 1825 and 1872. The immediate precursor ensemble to the current orchestra was the Cincinnati Orchestra, founded in 1872. In 1893, Helen Herron Taft founded the Cincinnati Orchestra Association, and the name of the orchestra was formalised to the Cincinnati Symphony Orchestra. The Cincinnati Symphony Orchestra gave its first concerts in 1895 at Pike's Opera House. A year later, the orchestra moved to Music Hall. Its first conductor was Frank Van der Stucken, a Texas-born musician of Flemish ancestry, who served until 1907. In the early years, the orchestra welcomed such composers as Richard Strauss and Edward McDowell. The orchestra also performed the U.S. premiere of the Symphony No. 5 of Gustav Mahler.

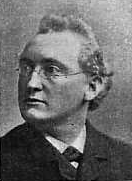
Frank Van der Stucken (1858–1929), founder

For three years, the orchestra was disbanded due to labor disputes and financial problems. Upon its reorganisation in 1909, Leopold Stokowski, then a young organist from England, served as music director of the newly organised orchestra for three years, to 1912, his first music directorship. In 1911, the orchestra relocated from Music Hall to Emery Auditorium. Subsequent music directors included Ernst Kunwald through 1918, Eugène Ysaÿe (1918–1922), Fritz Reiner (1922–1933), and Eugene Goossens (1933–1947). The orchestra returned to Music Hall in 1936. Its musical landmarks during this period included the U.S. premiere of Mahler's Symphony No. 3 (1912), its first recordings (1917), first national tours, and the world premieres of Aaron Copland's Fanfare for the Common Man and Lincoln Portrait.

Thor Johnson became music director in 1947, and led the orchestra in some of the first stereo recordings for Remington Records. Max Rudolf succeeded Johnson in 1958. Thomas Schippers became music director in 1970, building the orchestra's reputation and making several well-received recordings, but he died in 1977, at 47, of lung cancer. Also in 1977, the Cincinnati Pops Orchestra was formed, with Erich Kunzel as its conductor. After Schippers' death, Walter Susskind served as artistic advisor of the orchestra from 1978 until his own death in 1980.

In 1980, Michael Gielen became music director; he held the post until 1986. Jesús López-Cobos became music director in 1986. His achievements included leading on a 1995 European tour, the orchestra's first since 1969, and its first national television appearance on PBS. His 15-year music directorship remains the longest tenure with the orchestra. From September 2001 until his death in 2018, López-Cobos served as the orchestra's emeritus music director.

== Recent history ==
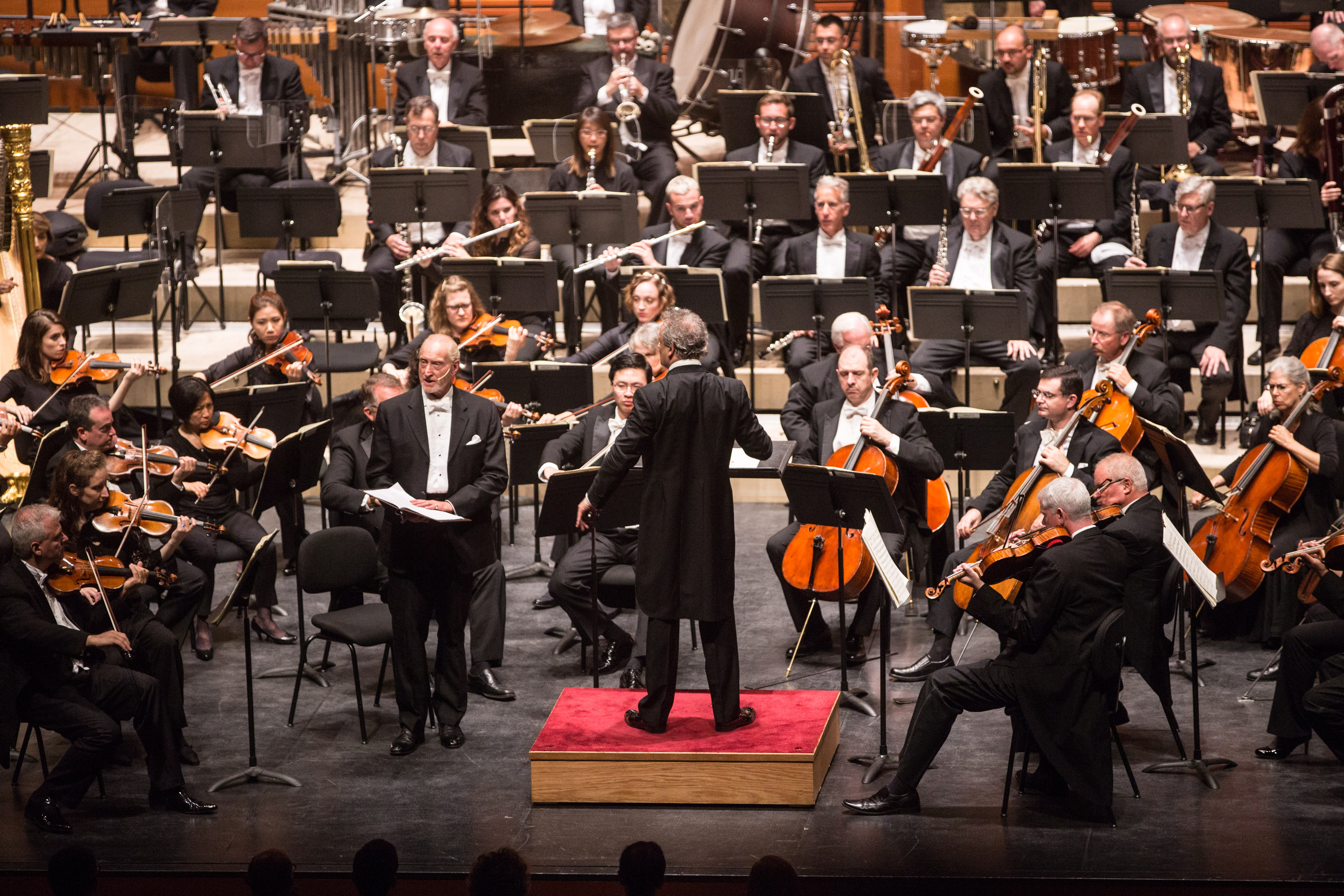
The Cincinnati Symphony performs at the Quincena Musical de San Sebastián in 2017

From 2001 to 2011, the orchestra's music director was Paavo Järvi. The orchestra made a number of recordings for the Telarc label during Järvi's tenure. In January 2007, the orchestra reported financial difficulties, projecting a monetary deficit of about US$2 million for the current fiscal year. In 2009, those difficulties, in addition to the purchase of Telarc by the Concord Music Group, led to the termination of the orchestra's recording contract. In late 2009, Cincinnati arts patron and philanthropist Louise Nippert announced a gift of $85 million (USD) for the orchestra. The orchestra was scheduled to receive directly about $3 million each year (around 75% of its annual distribution). 12% and 5% was allocated to the Cincinnati Opera and Ballet companies, respectively, with the intent of maintaining the Cincinnati Symphony as the resident orchestra for those organisations. In December 2010, John Morris Russell was named the new conductor of the Cincinnati Pops, following the death in 2009 of Erich Kunzel. After the conclusion of his music directorship in 2011, Järvi was named music director laureate. In January 2011, as part of the interim period after the conclusion of Järvi's music directorship and during the search for a new music director, the orchestra named a number of musicians to "Creative Director" posts to curate various concert series. For the 2011–2012 season, these musicians were:

- Rafael Frühbeck de Burgos, Creative Director of the Masterworks Series
- Philip Glass, Creative Director of the Boundless Series
- Lang Lang, Creative Director of the Ascent Series

For the 2012–2013 season, Frühbeck de Burgos reprised his role as Creative Director of the Masterworks Series. For the other two series, new musicians were named as directors:

- Jennifer Higdon, Creative Director of the Boundless Series
- Branford Marsalis, Creative Director of the Ascent Series.

In 2010, the orchestra launched its own record label, Cincinnati Symphony Orchestra Media. The inaugural album on the new label, "American Portraits," was released internationally in January 2011. In November 2011, it became the first orchestra in the world to establish a tweeting zone at its concerts.

In March 2011, Louis Langrée first guest-conducted the orchestra. Based on this appearance, in April 2012, the orchestra named Langrée as its 13th music director, effective as of the 2013–2014 season, with an initial contract of four years. He took the title of music director-designate with immediate effect. In March 2015, the orchestra announced the extension of Langrée's contract as music director through the 2019–2020 season. In February 2017, the orchestra further extended his contract through the 2021–2022 season. In January 2020, the orchestra announced the newest extension of Langrée's contract, through the 2023–2024 season. In June 2021, the orchestra announced that Langrée would conclude his tenure as its music director at the close of the 2023–2024 season.

In 2015, Cristian Măcelaru first guest-conducted the orchestra in a Cincinnati Opera production of Il Trovatore. He returned for his subscription concert debut with the orchestra in January 2016. In April 2024, the orchestra announced the appointment of conductor Mӑcelaru as its next music director, with him scheduled to hold the title of music director-designate in the 2024–2025 season, and subsequently scheduled to become music director in the 2025–2026 season, with an initial contract through the 2028–2029 season.

== Premieres ==
The following is a list of U.S. and world premieres of works at the Cincinnati Symphony Orchestra and May Festival (MF):

Composer	Work	Conductor and Soloist(s)	Performance	Premiere
Gregory Spears	Castor and Patience (opera)	Kazem Abdullah	July 17, 2022	World
Gabriela Ortiz	New Work	Louis Langrée	May 14–15, 2022 (scheduled)	World
Guillaume Connesson	Oboe Concerto	Dwight Parry, oboe	May 6–7, 2022 (scheduled)	World
Julia Adolphe	Paper Leaves on Fields of Clay	Louis Langrée	April 8–9, 2022 (scheduled)	World
Kinds of Kings	New Work for Eighth Blackbird and Orchestra	Louis Langrée & Eighth Blackbird	March 25–27, 2022 (scheduled)	World
Mark Simpson	Violin Concerto	Louis Langrée & Nicola Benedetti, violin	January 14–15, 2022 (scheduled)	U.S.
Sebastian Currier	Track 8	Louis Langrée	November 19–20, 2021 (scheduled)	World
Christopher Cerrone	A Body, Moving	Louis Langrée	April 9–11, 2021	World
William Winstead	Passages in Time	Louis Langrée	January 18–19, 2020	World
Francisco Coll	Hidd'n Blue	Gustavo Gimeno	October 25–26, 2019	U.S.
Christopher Rouse	Symphony No. 6	Louis Langrée	October 18–19, 2019	World
Gabriella Smith	f(x) = sin^{2}x - 1/x, for orchestra	Eun Sun Kim	September 28–29, 2019	World
Bryce Dessner	Concerto for Two Pianos	Louis Langrée, Katia & Marielle Labèque, duo pianos	September 20–21, 2019	U.S.
Shara Nova	Look Around	arr. Nate Thatcher	August 3, 2019	World
James MacMillan	Credo	Juanjo Mena	May 25, 2019 (MF)	North American
Mark Simpson	The Immortal for solo baritone, semi chorus, optional large choru,& orchestra	Juanjo Mena	May 17, 2019 (MF)	U.S.
Clarice Assad	Cantos da Terra: Borboleta	Matthew Swanson	April 14, 2019 (MF)	World
Jonathan Bailey Holland	Ode	Louis Langrée	November 9–10, 2018	World
Pierre Jalbert	Passage	Louis Langrée	April 14–15, 2018	World
Enrico Chapela	Radioaxial	James Gaffigan	April 6–7, 2018	World
Emily Cooley	Abound	Louis Langrée	November 24–25, 2017	World
Julia Adolphe	Equinox for Chorus	Louis Langrée & May Festival Chorus	November 4–5, 2017	World
Jonathan Bailey Holland	Stories from Home	Louis Langrée	October 5–7, 2017	World
Bryce Dessner	Wires	Matthias Pintscher & Bryce Dessner, guitar	January 14, 2017	U.S.
Michael Fiday	Three for One	Louis Langrée	November 25–26, 2016	World
Gregory Spears	Fellow Travelers (opera)	Mark Gibson	June 17, 2016	World
Julia Adolphe	See Dream Elegies for Chorus, Oboe, And Cello	James Conlon	May 22, 2016 (MF)	World
Alvin Singleton	Prayer for tenor solo, chamber choir, and ensemble	James Conlon	May 22, 2016 (MF)	World
Zhou Tian	Concerto for Orchestra	Louis Langrée	May 13–14, 2016	World
Thierry Escaich	Psalmos, Concerto for Orchestra	Louis Langrée & Thierry Escaich, organ	May 6–7, 2016	World
Bryce Dessner	Réponse Lutoslawski	Louis Langrée	March 19, 2016	U.S.
Gunther Schuller	Symphonic Triptych	Cristian Mâcelaru	January 22–23, 2016	World
Sebastian Currier	Flex	Louis Langrée	November 19–21, 2015	World
TJ Cole	Elegy	Louis Langrée	November 13–14, 2015	World
Jonathan Bailey Holland	Equality	Louis Langrée	November 13–14, 2015	World
Kristin P. Kuster	Forgive	Louis Langrée	November 13–14, 2015	World
Daníel Bjarnason	Collider	Louis Langrée	March 14, 2015	World
Caroline Shaw	Lo	Louis Langrée & Caroline Shaw, violin	March 13, 2015	World
André Previn	Concerto for Violin, Cello, and Orchestra	Louis Langrée, Jaime Laredo, violin & Sharon Robinson, cello	November 21, 2014	World
David Lang	mountain	Louis Langrée	March 22, 2014	World
Nico Muhly	Pleasure Ground	Louis Langrée & Nathan Wyatt, baritone	March 21, 2014	World
Zhou Tian	Trace (originally titled Poem from a Vanished Time)	Mei-Ann Chen & Timothy Lees, violin	March 23–24, 2013	World
Philip Glass	Cello Concerto No. 2, Naqoyqatsi	Dennis Russell Davies & Matt Haimovitz, cello	March 30–31, 2012	
Erkki-Sven Tüür	Piano Concerto	Paavo Järvi & Awadagin Pratt, piano	May 13–14, 2011	U.S.
Erkki-Sven Tüür	Fireflower	Paavo Järvi	May 13–14, 2011	
Charles Coleman	P. J. Fanfare	Paavo Järvi	May 6–7, 2011	
Stewart Goodyear	Count Up	Paavo Järvi	March 25–26, 2011	
Jörg Widmann	Souvenir bavarois	Paavo Järvi	February 3–5, 2011	
Jonathan Bailey Holland	The Party Starter	Paavo Järvi	January 28–29, 2011	
Ian Krouse	Out of the Cradle, Endlessly Rocking	Robert Porco	May 21, 2010 (MF)	
Erkki-Sven Tüür	Symphony No. 7, Pietas	Paavo Järvi	September 25–27, 2009	
Jeffrey Mumford	. . . and symphonies of deepening light . . . expanding . . . ever cavernous	James Gaffigan	March 27–28, 2009	
Marc André Dalbavie	Concerto for Flute	Paavo Järvi & Emmanuel Pahud, flute	March 20–21, 2009	
Erkki-Sven Tüür	The Path and the Traces	Paavo Järvi	January 16–18, 2009	
Robert Johnson	prairyerth	Paavo Järvi	May 2–3, 2008	
Jörg Widmann	Antiphon	Paavo Järvi	March 7, 2008	
Krzysztof Penderecki	Concerto for Piano and Orchestra (Resurrection), Rev. 2007	Krzysztof Penderecki & Barry Douglas, piano	December 7–8, 2007	
Charles Coleman	Deep Woods	Paavo Järvi	May 3–5, 2007	
Adolphus Hailstork	Earthrise	James Conlon	May 19, 2006 (MF)	
Aulis Sallinen	Symphony No. 8, Op. 81, Autumnal Fragments	Paavo Järvi	January 20–22, 2005	
Stephen Paulus	All Things are Passing	Robert Porco	May 23, 2004 (MF)	
Jonathan Bailey Holland	Halcyon Sun	Paavo Järvi	April 30 – May 2, 2004	
Douglas Lowry	Exordium Nobile	Paavo Järvi	September 12–13, 2003	
Lorenzo Palomo	Concierto de Cienfuegos	Jesús López-Cobos & Los Romeros, guitar	April 25–27, 2003	
Kevin Puts	Symphony No. 2	Paavo Järvi	March 7–9, 2002	
Carl Orff	Tanzende Faune, Op. 21	Paavo Järvi	November 15–17, 2001	
Erkki-Sven Tüür	Concierto for Violin & Orchestra	Paavo Järvi & Isabelle van Keulen, violin	November 15–17, 2001	
Charles Coleman	Streetscape	Paavo Järvi	September 14–15, 2001	
Joel Hoffman	The Smile	Jesús López-Cobos	March 23–24, 2001	
Randy Edelman	Transcontinental - A Mad Musical Dash Across the USA	Erich Kunzel	December 1–2, 2000	
Steven Reineke	Rise of the Phoenix (Fanfare for Orchestra)	Erich Kunzel	December 1–2, 2000	
Jonathan D. Kramer	Rewind: A Semi-Suite	Jesús López-Cobos	November 10–11, 2000	
Ellen Taaffe Zwilich	Millennium Fantasy for Piano and Orchestra	Jesús López-Cobos & Jeffrey Biegel, piano	September 22–23, 2000	
Daniel Brewbaker	Cincinnatus Psalm	James Conlon	May 26, 2000 (MF)	
Gideon Lewensohn	Serenata Concertante	Serenata Concertante	May 13, 1999 (MF)	
Kurt Weill	Der Weg der Veheissung: Propheten	James Conlon	May 13, 1999 (MF)	
Robert Johnson	Autunnale for Orchestra, Oboe and English Horn	Jesús López-Cobos, Richard Johnson, oboe & Robert Walters, English horn	April 23–24, 1999	
George Duke	Muir Woods Suite (for Jazz Piano and Orchestra)	Jesús López-Cobos & George Duke, jazz piano	April 29 – May 1, 1999	
Alvin Singleton	Praisemaker	James Conlon	May 22, 1998 (MF)	
Leonardo Balada	Concierto Magico for Guitar and Orchestra	Jesús López-Cobos & Angel Romero, guitar	March 13–14, 1998	
Joel Hoffman	Millennium Dances	Jesús López-Cobos	September 19–20, 1997	
Dave Brubeck	Orchestral Suite from Joy In The Morning	Jesús López-Cobos	January 24–25, 1997	
Bernard Rands	Fanfare for Orchestra	Jesús López-Cobos	September 27–28, 1996	
Gunther Schuller	An Arc Ascending	Jesús López-Cobos	June 12, 1996	
Robert Johnson	Nightpiece (After Blakelock)	Jesús López-Cobos	February 8–10, 1996	
Dennis Eberhard	For the Musicians of the Queen	Jesús López-Cobos	January 12–13, 1996	
Edwin London	Fanfarronda	Jesús López-Cobos	November 30 – December 2, 1995	
Eric Stokes	Fanfare of Rings	Jesús López-Cobos	November 24–25, 1995	
Franz Lehár	Feiber, Tone Poem	Erich Kunzel & Carsten Süss, tenor	November 10–11, 1995	
Franz Lehár	Triumphal March	Erich Kunzel	November 10–11, 1995	
Mary Judge	Fanfare for a Celebration	Jesús López-Cobos	September 22–23, 1995	
Joel Hoffman	ChiaSsO	Jesús López-Cobos	September 15–16, 1995	
John Corigliano	To Music Fanfare	Jesús López-Cobos	May 4–6, 1995	
Frank Proto	Ghost in Machine	Jesús López-Cobos; Cleo Laine, vocalist & Paul Winfield, narrator	April 28–29, 1995	
Roque Cordero	Fanfarria Jubilosa	Jesús López-Cobos	April 21–22, 1995	
Leonardo Balada	Shadows, for Orchestra	Jesús López-Cobos	March 31 – April 1, 1995	
Steven Stucky	Fanfare for Cincinnati	Jesús López-Cobos	March 10–11, 1995	
Fred Lerdahl	Without Fanfare	Jesús López-Cobos	March 10–11, 1995	
Michael Schelle	Centennimania	Keith Lockhart	March 2–4, 1995	
David Stock	Fanfarria	Ivan Fischer	February 24–25, 1995	
Philip Koplow	Clear to the Final Ocean	Ivan Fischer	February 17–18, 1995	
Marc Neikrug	Flamenco Fanfare	Pinchas Zukerman & Eric Kim, cello	December 1–3, 1994	
Gerald Plain	Fireworks for Large Orchestra	Sir Andrew Davis	November 25–26, 1994	
Marta Ptaszynska	Fanfare for Peace	Jesús López-Cobos	November 18–19, 1994	
Jonathan D. Kramer	Cincy in C	Jesús López-Cobos	November 10–12, 1994	
Krzysztof Penderecki	Entrata	Krzysztof Penderecki	November 4–5, 1994	
Samuel Adler	Centennial	Yuri Temirkanov	October 21–22, 1994	
Daniel Asia	Gateways: Fanfare for Cincinnati	Hermann Michael	October 7–8, 1994	
Gerhard Samuel	Auguri	Jesús López-Cobos	September 30 – October 1, 1994	
Vincent McDermott	Titus Magnificus	Jesús López-Cobos	September 23–24, 1994	
Gunther Schuller	The Past is in the Present	Jesús López-Cobos	March 25–26, 1994	
William Waite	Gems	Jesús López-Cobos	April 23–24, 1993	
Edwin London	A Hero of Our Time	Jesús López-Cobos	September 25–26, 1992	
Philip Koplow	Legacy: J. Ralph Corbett	Jesús López-Cobos	March 6–7, 1992	
Tania León	Carabalí	Jesús López-Cobos	January 17–18, 1992	
Frank Proto	The New Seasons	Jesús López-Cobos; Michael Thornton, tuba; Richard Jensen, percussion & William Platt, percussion	April 19–20, 1991	
Jonathan D. Kramer	About Face	Jesús López-Cobos	November 10–11, 1989	
Ronald Caltabiano	Northwest!	Jesús López-Cobos	January 27–28, 1989	
Joel Hoffman	Concerto for Violin and Orchestra	Jesús López-Cobos & Cho-Liang Lin, violin	January 13–14, 1989	
Frank Proto	Dialogue for Synclavier and Orchestra	Michael Gielen	March 7–8, 1986	
Earl Kim	Where Grief Slumbers	Michael Gielen and Benita Valente, soprano	February 28 – March 1, 1986	
Ira Taxin	Concerto for Brass Quintet and Orchestra	Bernard Rubenstein; Empire Brass Quintet, & brass quintet	March 30–31, 1984	
Jonathan D. Kramer	Moments in and out of Time	Michael Gielen	February 10–11, 1984	
Norman Dinnerstein	Golden Bells	Michael Gielen	October 14–15, 1983	
Hans Werner Henze	Dramatic Scenes, Part 1, from Orpheus	Michael Gielen	March 11–12, 1983	
Mauricio Kagel	Variations Without Fugue	Michael Gielen & Eugene Pridonoff, piano	February 18–19, 1983	
Bernd Alois Zimmerman	Dialogue for Two Pianos and Orchestra	Michael Gielen, Alfons & Aloys Kontarsky, piano	February 12–13, 1982	
Frank Proto	Concert No. 2 for Double Bass	David Stahl & Francois Rabbath, contrabass	November 20–21, 1981	
Ned Rorem	Double Concerto in Ten Movements for Cello and Piano	Jorge Mester; Peter Wiley, cello &Lee Luvisi, piano	November 13–14, 1981	
Dmitri Shostakovich	Suite on Verses of Michelangelo, Op. 145A	John Nelson & John Shirley-Quirk, bass-baritone	December 12–13, 1980	
Arvo Pärt	Cantus in Memory of Benjamin Britten	Neeme Järvi	May 16–17, 1980	
Richard Rodney Bennett	Actaeon, For Horn And Orchestra	Walter Susskind & Barry Tuckwell, horn	December 7–8, 1979	
Frank Proto	Concerto for Cello and Orchestra	David Stahl & Peter Wiley, cello	April 20–21, 1979	
Scott Huston	Fanfare for the 200th	Kazimierz Kord	May 6–7, 1977	
Paul Cooper	Homage	Carmon DeLeone	April 29–30, 1977	
Gene Gutche	Perseus and Andromeda XX (Asymmetrical Dances), Op. 50	Kenneth Schermerhorn	February 25–26, 1977	
Alan Hovhaness	Fanfare for the New Atlantis	Kenneth Schermerhorn	February 25–26, 1977	
Frank Proto	Bicentennial Fanfare	Thomas Schippers	November 5–6, 1976	
Paul Creston	Fanfare '76 - The Republic Stands, Op. 106	Thomas Schippers	March 5–6, 1976	
Ingolf Dahl	Symphony Concertante for Two Clarinets and Orchestra	Thomas Schippers; Carmine Campione, clarinet & Richard Waller, clarinet	March 5–6, 1976	
Howard Hanson	Laude: Chorale and Fanfare	Carmon DeLeone	February 20–21, 1976	
Ned Rorem	Air Music, Ten Variations for Orchestra	Thomas Schippers	December 5–6, 1975	
Virgil Thomson	Fanfare: A Portrait	Thomas Schippers	December 5–6, 1975	
Walter Piston	Bicentennial Fanfare	Thomas Schippers	November 14–15, 1975	
Donald Erb	New England's Prospect	James Levine	May 17, 1974	
Felix Labunski	Primavera	Thomas Schippers	April 19–20, 1974	
Claus Adam	Concerto for Violoncello and Orchestra	Carmon DeLeone & Stephen Kates, cello	October 26–27, 1973	
Frank Proto	Concerto in One Movement for Violin and String Bass	Thomas Schippers; Ruggiero Ricci, violin & Barry Green, contrabass	October 13–14, 1972	
Frank Martin	Concerto No. 2 for Piano and Orchestra	Thomas Schippers & Paul Badura-Skoda, piano	April 7–8, 1972	
James Furman	I Have a Dream, Symphonic Oratorio	Erich Kunzel	January 22–23, 1971	
Dale Frank	Kosha	Erich Kunzel	June 7, 1970	
Wilfred Josephs	Mortales, Op. 62	Julius Rudel	May 23, 1970 (MF)	
Gen Parchman	Concerto for Timpani and Orchestra	Erich Kunzel & Eugene Espino, timpani	May 1–2, 1970	
Bernd Alois Zimmermann	Musique pour les soupers du Roi Ubu	Erich Kunzel	April 24–25, 1970	
Kurt Weill	Das Berliner Requiem	Erich Kunzel, Seth McCoy, tenor & William Justus, baritone	April 3–4, 1970	
Jenõ Takács	Antiqua Hungarica, Op. 47	Max Rudolf	March 7–8, 1970	
Dave Brubeck	CSO 75th Anniversary Salute	Erich Kunzel	February 27–28, 1970	
Gardner Read	Symphony No. 4, Op. 42	Erich Kunzel	January 30–31, 1970	
Paul Reif	Fanfare and Fugato	Erich Kunzel	December 12–13, 1969	
Peter Mennin	The Pied Piper of Hamelin	Max Rudolf	May 2, 1969 (MF)	
Alan Hovhaness	Symphony No. 19, Op. 217, Vishnu	Erich Kunzel	January 10–11, 1969	
Hans Werner Henze	Moralities	Max Rudolf	May 18, 1968 (MF)	
Wilfred Josephs	Symphony No. 2	Max Rudolf	March 8–9, 1968	
Scott Huston	Four Phantasms	Max Rudolf	February 2–3, 1968	
Bernard Rogers	Apparitions	Max Rudolf	December 15–16, 1967	
Tadeusz Baird	Concerto for Orchestra	Max Rudolf	November 17–18, 1967	
Wilfred Josephs	Requiem, Op. 39	Max Rudolf, Annie Walker, soprano; Norman Treigle, bass & Roy Christensen, cello	January 12–14, 1967	
Felix Labunski	Polish Renaissance Suite	Max Rudolf	January 6–7, 1967	
Miljenko Prohaska	Concertino for Jazz Quartet and Strings	Max Rudolf	December 9–10, 1966	
Gene Gutche	Hsiang Fei, Op. 40	Max Rudolf	October 21–22, 1966	
Yannis Papaioannou	Symphony No. 5	Max Rudolf	April 29–30, 1966	
Jenõ Takács	Eisenstadt Divertimento, Op. 75	Max Rudolf	January 14–15, 1966	
Franz Waxman	The Song of Terezin ( A Dramatic Song Cycle)	Stanislaw Skrowaczewski	May 22, 1965 (MF)	
George Crumb	Variazioni for Orchestra	Max Rudolf	May 8, 1965	
Easley Blackwood	Concerto for Clarinet and Orchestra, Op. 13	Max Rudolf & Richard Waller, clarinet	November 20–21, 1964	
Gen Parchman	Winsel Overture	Max Rudolf	January 17–18, 1964	
Gian Carlo Menotti	The Death of the Bishop of Brindisi	Max Rudolf	May 18, 1963 (MF)	
Gunther Schuller	Concerto for Piano and Orchestra	Max Rudolf & Jeanne Kirstein, piano	October 26–27, 1962	
Jenõ Takács	Passacaglia for String Orchestra, Op. 73	Max Rudolf	October 12–13, 1962	
Norman Dello Joio	Fantasy and Variations for Piano and Orchestra	Max Rudolf & Lorin Hollander, piano	March 9–10, 1962	
Donato di Veroli	Theme and Variations for Orchestra	Max Rudolf	November 25–26, 1961	
Gen Parchman	Symphony for String Orchestra	Max Rudolf	November 24–25, 1961	
Felix Labunski	Symphonic Dialogues	Max Rudolf	February 9–11, 1961	
Stjepan Sulek	Concerto No. 1 for Orchestra, Classical	Milan Horvat	January 20–21, 1961	
Joseph Tal	Symphony No. 1	Max Rudolf	February 12–13, 1960	
Gunther Schuller	Contours	Max Rudolf	December 31 – January 2, 1960	
Leo Kraft	Variations for Orchestra	Max Rudolf	December 1–3, 1960	
Margaret Johnson Bosworth	Queen City Suite	Josef Krips	May 4, 1960 (MF)	
Samuel S. Ensor	Verses from a Children's Book, Short Movements for Narrator and Orchestra	Max Rudolf & Charlotte Shockley, narrator	February 12–13, 1960	
Henry Humphreys	A Christmas Fantasy-Overture, Op. 68	Max Rudolf	December 18–19, 1959	
Ingvar Lidholm	Ritornello	Max Rudolf	November 27–28, 1959	
Jenõ Takács	Semiseria Overture	Max Rudolf	October 23–24, 1959	
Peter Racine Fricker	Symphony No. 1, Op. 9	Max Rudolf	October 16–17, 1959	
John Haussermann	Two Pieces for Orchestra, Op. 27	Max Rudolf	April 3–4, 1959	
Bernard Rogers	Africa, Symphony in Two Movements	Max Rudolf	January 20 & January 31, 1959	
Charles Mills	Crazy Horse Symphony	Max Rudolf	November 28–29, 1958	
Jenõ Takács	The Chant of the Creation	Josef Krips	May 10, 1958 (MF)	
Toshitsugu Ogihara	Sinfonia di Giappone	Thor Johnson	April 11–12, 1958	
Henry Humphreys	The Wast Land, for Narrator and Orchestra	Thor Johnson; Babette Effron, piano & Basil Langton, narrator	April 3–4, 1958	
Serge Hovey	Sholem Aleichem Suite for Soloists, Chorus and Orchestra	Thor Johnson; Louis Linowitz, baritone; Lucille Rinsky, soprano and Robert Bennett, tenor	February 21–22, 1958	
George Rochberg	Waltz Serenade for Orchestra	Thor Johnson	February 14–15, 1958	
Lani Smith	Prelude and Scherzo for Brass, Timpani and Strings	Thor Johnson	December 6–7, 1957	
John Larkin	Mass for the Popes, for Voices, Strings and Organ	Thor Johnson & Robert Schaeffer, organ	November 1–2, 1957	
Serge de Gastyne	Hollin Hall Symphony	Thor Johnson	April 12–13, 1957	
Fritz Manczyk	Six Variations on a Sarabande by J.S. Bach	Thor Johnson	February 22–23, 1957	
Normand Lockwood	"Am I My Brother's Keeper?" Part I of the Oratorio Children of God	Thor Johnson; Marcelle Bolman, soprano; Shirley Delp, alto; Franklin Bens, tenor; Edgar Keenon, baritone & Donald Gramm, bass	February 1–2, 1957	
Henry Dixon Cowell	Variations for Orchestra	Thor Johnson	November 23–24, 1956	
Ernest Bloch	Symphony in E♭	Thor Johnson	November 9–10, 1956	
Wallingford Riegger	Overture for Orchestra, Op. 60	Thor Johnson	October 26–27, 1956	
Wallace Berry	Spoon River (Song Cycle for Baritone and Soprano)	Thor Johnson	May 11, 1956 (MF)	
Felix Labunski	Images of Youth	Thor Johnson	May 11, 1956 (MF)	
Franz Reizenstein	Voices of Night (A Cantata)	Josef Krips	May 10, 1956 (MF)	
Benjamin Britten	Gloriana, Op. 53	Josef Krips	May 8, 1956 (MF)	
Wolfgang Amadeus Mozart	Davidde Penitente, for Soloists, Chorus and Orchestra, K. 469 (First known performance in the US)	Thor Johnson, Lois Marshall, soprano; Loren Driscoll, tenor & Sadie Ruth McCollum, mezzo-soprano	February 17–18, 1956	
Serge de Gastyne	L'ile Lumiere	Thor Johnson	January 6–7, 1956	
William Schuman	Credendum, An Article of Faith	Thor Johnson	November 4, 1955	
Yasushi Akutagawa	Musica per Orchestra Sinfonica	Thor Johnson	October 21–22, 1955	
Anthony Donato	Solitude in the City, for Narrator and Orchestra	Thor Johnson & Carl Jacobs III, narrator	March 25–26, 1955	
Scott Huston	Abstract	Thor Johnson	February 11–12, 1955	
Jean Sibelius	The Tempest, Op. 109 [complete]	Thor Johnson, Bige Hammons, bass-baritone; Mary Garnett Poarch, soprano & Antioch Area Theatre, guest	December 3–4, 1954	
Franz Schmidt	The Book with Seven Seals (An Oratorio)	Josef Krips	May 7, 1954 (MF)	
Gösta Nystroem	Concerto for Viola and Orchestra	Thor Johnson & Erik Kahlson, viola	April 15–17, 1954	
Baruch Cohon	Let There be Light	Thor Johnson & Abraham Braude, baritone	February 12–13, 1954	
Charles Hamm	Sinfonia for Orchestra	Thor Johnson	February 5–6, 1954	
Harald Saeverud	Galdreslatten (Danza Sinfonica con Passacaglia), Op. 20	Thor Johnson	October 16–17, 1953	
William C. Byrd	Cincinnati Profiles, Suite for Orchestra: The Seven Hills	Thor Johnson	February 27–28, 1953	
Eugene Hemmer	Cincinnati Profiles, Suite for Orchestra: Fountain Square	Thor Johnson	February 27–28, 1953	
John Larkin	Cincinnati Profiles, Suite for Orchestra: Mount Adams, A Symphonic Impression	Thor Johnson	February 27–28, 1953	
Robert Whitcomb	Cincinnati Profiles, Suite for Orchestra: From the Ohio River	Thor Johnson	February 27–28, 1953	
Uuno Klami	Kalevala Sarja (“Kalevala Suite”), Op. 23	Thor Johnson	April 4–5, 1952	
Paul Creston	Walt Whitman, Op. 53	Thor Johnson	March 28–29, 1952	
Vittorio Rieti	Concerto for Two Pianos & Orchestra	Thor Johnson; Arthur Gold, piano & Robert Fizdale, piano	February 15–16, 1952	
Vittorio Giannini	A Canticle of Christmas, for Baritone, Chorus and Orchestra	Thor Johnson & Hubert Kockritz, bariton	December 14–15, 1951	
Carl Hugo Grimm	A Christmas Concerto, for Orchestra, Op. 52	Thor Johnson	December 14–15, 1951	
Roy Harris	Cumberland Concerto for Orchestra	Thor Johnson	October 19–20, 1951	
Ralph Vaughan Williams	Fantasia (Quasi Variazone) on the “Old 104th” Psalm Tune	Thor Johnson & Frank Glazer, piano	April 20–21, 1951	
Vittorio Giannini	Sinfonia per Orchestra	Thor Johnson	April 6–7, 1951	
Darius Milhaud	Suite from Jeux de Printemps	Thor Johnson	March 31 – April 1, 1951	
Felix Labunski	Variations for Orchestra	Thor Johnson	January 6–7, 1951	
Rudolph Ganz	Symphonic Overture to an Unwritten Comedy, Laughter...yet Love, Op. 34	Thor Johnson	November 24–25, 1950	
Quincy Porter	The Desolate City, for Baritione and Orchestra	Thor Johnson & Mack Harrell, baritone	November 24–25, 1950	
Don Gillis	Thomas Wolfe, American	Thor Johnson & Samuel Messer, narrator	October 27–28, 1950	
Carlos Chavez	Toccata Para Instrumentos de Percusión	Thor Johnson, Fred W. Noak, percussion; Ernest Lorenz, percussion; Edward Wuebold, percussion; Glenn Robinson, percussion; George J. Carey, percussion & Harold J. Thompson, percussion	April 22–23, 1950	
Arthur Honegger	Jour de Fete Suisse	Thor Johnson	December 31 – January 1, 1949	
Aaron Avshalomov	Symphony No. 2 in E Minor	Thor Johnson	December 30–31, 1949	
James Gutheim Heller	Rhapsody for Orchestra	Thor Johnson	December 16–17, 1949	
John Antill	Suite from Corrobboree	Eugene Goossens	November 23–24, 1949	
David Diamond	The Enormous Room	Thor Johnson	November 19–20, 1949	
Eric Delamarter	"Cluny" Dialogue for Viola and Orchestra	Thor Johnson & Erik Kahlson, viola	October 22–23, 1949	
John Haussermann	Symphony No. 3	Thor Johnson	April 1–2, 1949	
Cecil Effinger	Little Symphony No. 2	Thor Johnson	February 4–5, 1949	
Jean Sibelius	Scenes Historiques	Thor Johnson	December 10–11, 1948	
Henry Bryant	The Promised Land ( A Symphony of Palestine) [Symphony No. 2]	Thor Johnson	November 26–27, 1948	
Don Gillis	Portrait of a Frontier Town	Thor Johnson	February 21–22, 1948	
Henry Brant	Symphony No. 1 in B♭	Thor Johnson	January 30–31, 1948	
David Broekman	Symphony No. 2	Eugene Goossens	March 7–8, 1947	
Martin G. Dumler	Te Deum	Eugene Goossens	May 11, 1946 (MF)	
Frederick Delius	A Mass of Life	Eugene Goossens	May 8, 1946 (MF)	
Ulrich Cole	Concerto No. 2 for Piano and Orchestra	Eugene Goossens & Ulrich Cole, piano	March 1–2, 1946	
Carl Hugo Grimm	An American Overture, Op. 47	Eugene Goossens	February 15–16, 1946	
John Haussermann	Ronde Carnavalesque	Eugene Goossens	April 6–7, 1945	
Gunther Schuller	Concerto for Horn & Orchestra	Eugene Goossens & Gunther Schuller, French horn	April 6–7, 1945	
Eugene Goossens	Jubilee Variations: Variations on a Theme by Goossens	Eugene Goossens	March 23–24, 1945	
William Grant Still	Festive Overture	Eugene Goossens	January 19–20, 1945	
Bernard Rogers	The Passion	Eugene Goossens	May 12, 1944 (MF)	
John Haussermann	Symphony No. 2, Op. 22	Eugene Goossens	April 1 – March 31, 1944	
Pescara	Symphonic Sketch, Tibet	Eugene Goossens	March 3–4, 1944	
Eugene Goossens	Phantasy-Concerto for Piano and Orchestra, Op. 60	Eugene Goossens & José Iturbi, piano	February 25–26, 1944	
Eric Werner	Symphony-Requiem	Eugene Goossens	January 21–22, 1944	
Bedřich Smetana	Country Scenes from Bohemia	Eugene Goossens	January 7–8, 1944	
Dana Suesse	Concerto in E Minor for Two Pianos and Orchestra	Eugene Goossens; Ethel Bartlett, piano & Rae Robertson, piano	December 10–11, 1943	
Eugene Goossens	Fanfare for the Merchant Marine	Eugene Goossens	April 16–17, 943	
Howard Hanson	Fanfare for the Signal Corps	Eugene Goossens	April 2–3, 1943	
Martin G. Dumler	Prelude and Fugue	Eugene Goossens	March 26–27, 1943	
Carl Hugo Grimm	Montana, Two Impressions for Orchestra	Eugene Goossens	March 26–27, 1943	
Aaron Copland	Fanfare for the Common Man	Eugene Goossens	March 12–13, 1943	
Felix Borowski	Fanfare for the American Soldier	Eugene Goossens	March 5–6, 1943	
Anis Fuleihan	Fanfare for Medical Corps	Eugene Goossens	February 26–27, 1943	
Harl McDonald	Fanfare for Poland	Eugene Goossens	February 5–6, 1943	
Leo Sowerby	Fanfare for Airmen	Eugene Goossens	January 29–30, 1943	
Morton Gould	Fanfare for Freedom	Eugene Goossens	January 22–23, 1943	
Virgil Thomson	Fanfare for France	Eugene Goossens	January 15–16, 1943	
William Grant Still	Fanfare for American Heroes	Eugene Goossens	December 18–19, 1942	
Darius Milhaud	Fanfare de la Liberté	Eugene Goossens	December 11–12, 1942	
Paul Creston	Fanfare for Paratroopers	Eugene Goossens	November 27–28, 1942	
Daniel Gregory Mason	A Fanfare for Friends	Eugene Goossens	November 6–7, 1942	
Henry Dixon Cowell	Fanfare for the Forces of the Latin American Allies	Eugene Goossens	October 30–31, 1942	
Walter Piston	Fanfare for the Fighting French	Eugene Goossens	October 23–24, 1942	
Deems Taylor	Fanfare for Russia	Eugene Goossens	October 16–17, 1942	
Bernard Wagenaar	A Fanfare for Airmen	Eugene Goossens	October 9–10, 1942	
Aaron Copland	Lincoln Portrait	Andre Kostelanetz & William Adams, narrator	May 14, 1942	
Jerome Kern	“Portrait for Orchestra” from Mark Twain	Andre Kostelanetz	May 14, 1942	
Virgil Thomson	The Mayor La Guardia Waltzes	Andre Kostelanetz	May 14, 1942	
José Iturbi	Soliloquy for Orchestra	Eugene Goossens	January 23–24, 1942	
Benjamin Britten	Scottish Ballade for Two Pianos and Orchestra, Op. 26	Eugene Goossens; Ethel Bartlett, piano & Rae Robertson, piano	November 28–29, 1941	
Robert Casadesus	Symphony No. 2, Op. 32	Eugene Goossens	November 21–22, 1941	
James Gutheim Heller	Little Symphony for Small Orchestra	Eugene Goossens	April 4–5, 1941	
Eugene Goossens	Symphony No. 1, Op. 58	Eugene Goossens	April 12–13, 1940	
Bernard Rogers	Song of the Nightingale, Symphonic Pictures after Hans Christian Andersen	Eugene Goossens	March 21–23, 1940	
Robert Casadesus	Concerto for Two Pianos and Orchestra	Eugene Goossens, Robert Casadesus, piano & Gaby Casadesus, piano	February 9–10, 1940	
James Gutheim Heller	Watchman, What of the Night: Excerpts	Eugene Goossens	May 3, 1939 (MF)	
Jean Ten Have	Symphonic Prelude	Eugene Goossens	April 6–8, 1939	
Ernest John Moeran	Symphony in G Minor	Eugene Goossens	Mar 25 - 26,1938	
Carlos Lopez Buchardo	Escenas Argentinas	Frieder Weissmann	January 7–8, 1938	
Sir Arthur Seymour Sullivan	Overture In C (In Memoriam)	Eugene Goossens	October 13, 1937	
Richard Strauss	Prelude to Act III of Arabella, Op. 79	Eugene Goossens	October 16–17, 1937	
R. Nathaniel Dett	The Ordering of Moses	Eugene Goossens	May 7, 1937 (MF)	
Edgar Stillman Kelley	Gulliver, His Voyage to Lilliput, A Symphony in Four Movements	Eugene Goossens	April 9–10, 1937	
Eugene Goossens	Pictures for Flute, Strings and Percussion	Eugene Goossens & Ary van Leeuwen, flute	February 28–29, 1936	
James Gutheim Heller	“Lento” from Four Sketches for Orchestra	Eugene Goossens	February 7–8, 1936	
Karol Rathaus	Serenade for Orchestra, Op. 35	Eugene Goossens	January 17–18, 1936	
Martin G. Dumler	Stabat Mater	Eugene Goossens	May 25, 1935 (MF)	
Sir Granville Bantock	Atalanta in Calydon	Eugene Goossens	May 24, 1935 (MF)	
Cyril Scott	La Belle Dame Sans Merci	Eugene Goossens	May 24, 1935 (MF)	
Harry Waldo Warner	Hampton Wick, Op. 38	Eugene Goossens	November 30 – December 1, 1934	
Sir Arnold Bax	Symphony No. 5	Eugene Goossens	April 6–7, 1934	
John Ireland	Prelude, The Forgotten Rite	Eugene Goossens	April 6–7, 1934	
Nikolai Rimsky-Korsakov	Overture to The Maid of Pskov	Eugene Goossens	March 16–17, 1934	
Emerson Whithorne	Symphony No. 1 in C Minor, Op. 49	Eugene Goossens	January 12–13, 1934	
Leopold Godowsky	Java Suite	Eugene Goossens	February 2–3, 1933	
Francis Poulenc	Mouvements perpetuels	Eugene Goossens	December 4–5, 1931	
M. Enrico	Theme and Variations for Orchestra, Op. 131	Fritz Reiner	March 27–28, 1931	
Darius Milhaud	Concerto No. 1 for Viola and Orchestra, Op. 108	Fritz Reiner & Vladimir Bakaleinikoff, viola	February 27–28, 1931	
Maurice Ravel	Menuet antique	Fritz Reiner	December 12–13, 1930	
Roger Sessions	Suite from The Black Maskers	Fritz Reiner	December 5–6, 1930	
Filip Lazar	Tziganes, Scherzo for Orchestra	Fritz Reiner	November 28–29, 1930	
Daniel Gregory Mason	Symphony No. 2 in A major	Fritz Reiner	November 7–8, 1930	
Kurt Weill	Concerto for Violin and Wind Orchestra, Op. 12	Fritz Reiner & Emil Heermann, violin	March 28–29, 1930	
Ferruccio Busoni	Concerto in C Major for Piano, Orchestra and Male Voices, Op. 39	Fritz Reiner & Karin Dayas, piano	March 14–15, 1930	
Samuel L. M. Barlow	Alba, Symphonic Poem	Fritz Reiner	January 31 – February 1, 1930	
Louis Gruenberg	Jazz Suite, Op. 28	Fritz Reiner	March 22–23, 1929	
Daniel Gregory Mason	Chanticleer, Festival Overture, Op. 27	Fritz Reiner	November 23–24, 1928	
Riccardo Pick-Mangiagalli	Piccola Suite	Victor de Sabata	November 25–26, 1927	
Jesús Guridi	Thus Sang the Little Ones	Frank Van der Stucken	May 7, 1927 (MF)	
Johann Sebastian Bach	Cantata No. 205, Aeols Appeased (First known US performance)	Frank Van der Stucken	May 6, 1927 (MF)	
Béla Bartók	Two Scenes from The Miraculous Mandarin	Fritz Reiner	April 1–2, 1927	
Arthur Bliss	Hymn to Apollo	Fritz Reiner	March 18–19, 1927	
Arthur Honegger	Concertino for Piano and Orchestra	Fritz Reiner & Walter Gieseking, piano	March 18–19, 1927	
Lodewijk Mortelmans	Young America	Frank Van der Stucken	May 9, 1925 (MF)	
Vittorio Rieti	Concerto for Quintet of Wind Instruments and Orchestra	Fritz Reiner	April 17–18, 1925	
Béla Bartók	Dance Suite for Orchestra	Fritz Reiner	April 3–4, 1925	
Wilhelm Grosz	Prelude to a Comic Opera, Op. 14	Fritz Reiner	February 6–7, 1925	
Henry Kimball Hadley	Resurgam, Op. 98	Frank Van der Stucken	May 5, 1923 (MF)	
Béla Bartók	Suite No. 1 for Orchestra, Op. 3	Fritz Reiner	January 19–20, 1923	
Alexander Glazunov	Symphony No. 3 in D Minor, Op. 33	Fritz Reiner	November 24 - 15,1922	
Albert Dupuis	Symphonic Fragments from Jean-Michel	Eugène Ysaÿe	November 19–20, 1920	
Théophile Ysaÿe	Symphony in F Major, Op. 14	Eugène Ysaÿe	March 28–29, 1919	
Edgar Stillman Kellye	Pilgrim’s Progress, Op. 37	Eugène Ysaÿe	May 10, 1918 (MF)	
Eugène Ysaÿe	Exil, Op. 25 for high strings	Eugène Ysaÿe	May 9, 1918 (MF)	
Josef Hofmann	Chromaticon, for Piano and Orchestra	Ernst Kunwald & Josef Hofmann, piano	November 24–25, 1916	
Louis G. Sturm	Preludio, Tema e Variazione in E Minor, Op. 34	Ernst Kunwald	February 26–27, 1915	
Gustav Mahler	Symphony No. 3 in D Minor	Ernst Kunwald	May 9, 1914 (MF)	
Richard Strauss	Alpensinfonie, Op. 64	Ernst Kunwald	April 27, 1916 (MF)	
Gustav Mahler	Symphony No. 5 in C♯ Minor	Frank van der Stucken	March 24–25, 1905	
Pier Adolfo Tirindelli	Leggenda Celeste	Frank van der Stucken	February 20–21, 1903	
Pier Adolfo Tirindelli	Concerto in G Minor for Violin and Orchestra	Frank van der Stucken & Pier Adolfo Tirindelli, violin	February 23–24, 1900	
Alexander Ritter	Charfreitag und Frohnleichnam	Frank van der Stucken	February 23–24, 1900	
Alexander Scriabin	Réverie in E Minor, Op. 24	Frank van der Stucken	December 1–2, 1899	
Felix Weingartner	Symphony in G Major, Op. 23	Frank van der Stucken	November 17–18, 1899	
Antonin Dvořák	The Midday Witch, Op. 108	Frank van der Stucken	February 12–13, 1897	
Johannes Brahms	Triumphlied (Triumphal Hymn), Op. 55	Theodore Thomas	May 11, 1875 (MF)	
Johann Sebastian Bach	Magnificat, BWV 243 (First known US performance)	Theodore Thomas	May 13, 1875 (MF)	
George Frederic Handel	Dettingen Te Deum (First known US performance)	Theodore Thomas	May 6, 1873 (MF)	
