= Capitol Theatre (Windsor, Ontario) =

Historic theatre in Windsor, Ontario, Canada

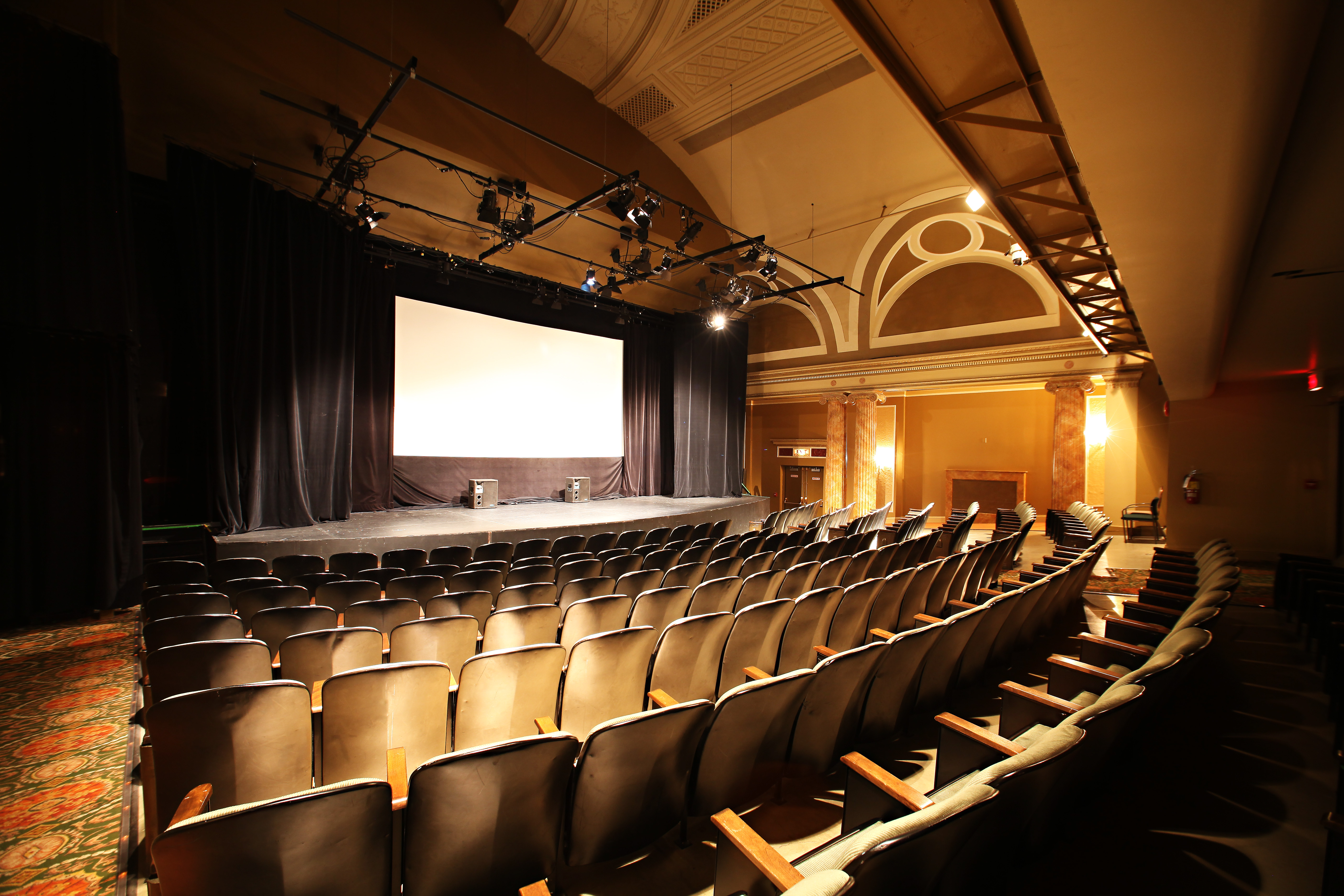
- Interactive map of Capitol Theatre
- Former names: Vaudeville-Cinema Theatre (1920–1922)
- Address: 121 University Avenue West; Windsor, Ontario; N9A 5P4
- Coordinates: 42.31706°N 83.04018°W
- Owner: City of Windsor
- Capacity: 620 (Main Theatre), 200 (Smaller Theatre)
- Type: Performing Arts Centre

Construction
- Opened: December 30, 1920
- Years active: 1920–present
- Cost: CA$600,000
- Architect: Thomas W. Lamb

Tenant
- Windsor Symphony Orchestra (2012–present)

Website
- www.capitoltheatrewindsor.ca

The Capitol Theatre is a historic theatre in Windsor, Ontario, Canada. Opened on December 30, 1920, by the Loew Theater Company owned by Marcus Loew at a cost of approximately CA$600,000. Designed by Toronto architect Thomas White Lamb, it was the largest single floor theatre in Canada at the time, with 1,995 seats.

The theatre was one of 16 Canadian theatres Lamb designed, including Toronto's Pantages (now the Ed Mirvish Theatre), the Elgin and Winter Garden Theatres, and the Ottawa Capitol.

The building was purchased in 1922 by Simon Mertsky and two other partners and it assumed its current name, as the Capitol Theatre. Famous Players (now Cineplex Inc.) purchased the building in 1929.

In 1975, the theatre was divided into three spaces available to rent: The main "Pentastar" theatre with 620 audience seats, the Daniel Patrick Kelly theatre with seating for 200 guests, and the Joy Family theatre for meetings and receptions.

The building closed in 1989 bringing the threat of demolition. In 1995 a group of community leaders and volunteers secured funding from the provincial and federal government to restore and renovate the interior of the building. The volunteer board declared bankruptcy in 2007.

The City purchased the building in 2008 and turned it over to the Windsor Symphony Orchestra to manage and use as their main venue. The Windsor International Film Festival also uses the theatre.

In the heart of Downtown Windsor, the Capitol Theatre offers the a three-in-one venue, joined by a classic lobby and bar area.

Today, the building is owned by the City of Windsor, managed by its anchor tenant, the Windsor Symphony Orchestra, and available to local artists and community groups as a multi-purpose venue for dance, literature, music, drama, film, and more. Generations of families have happy memories of the Capitol, and new ones are being made.

== Gallery ==
Capitol Theatre Windsor Gallery

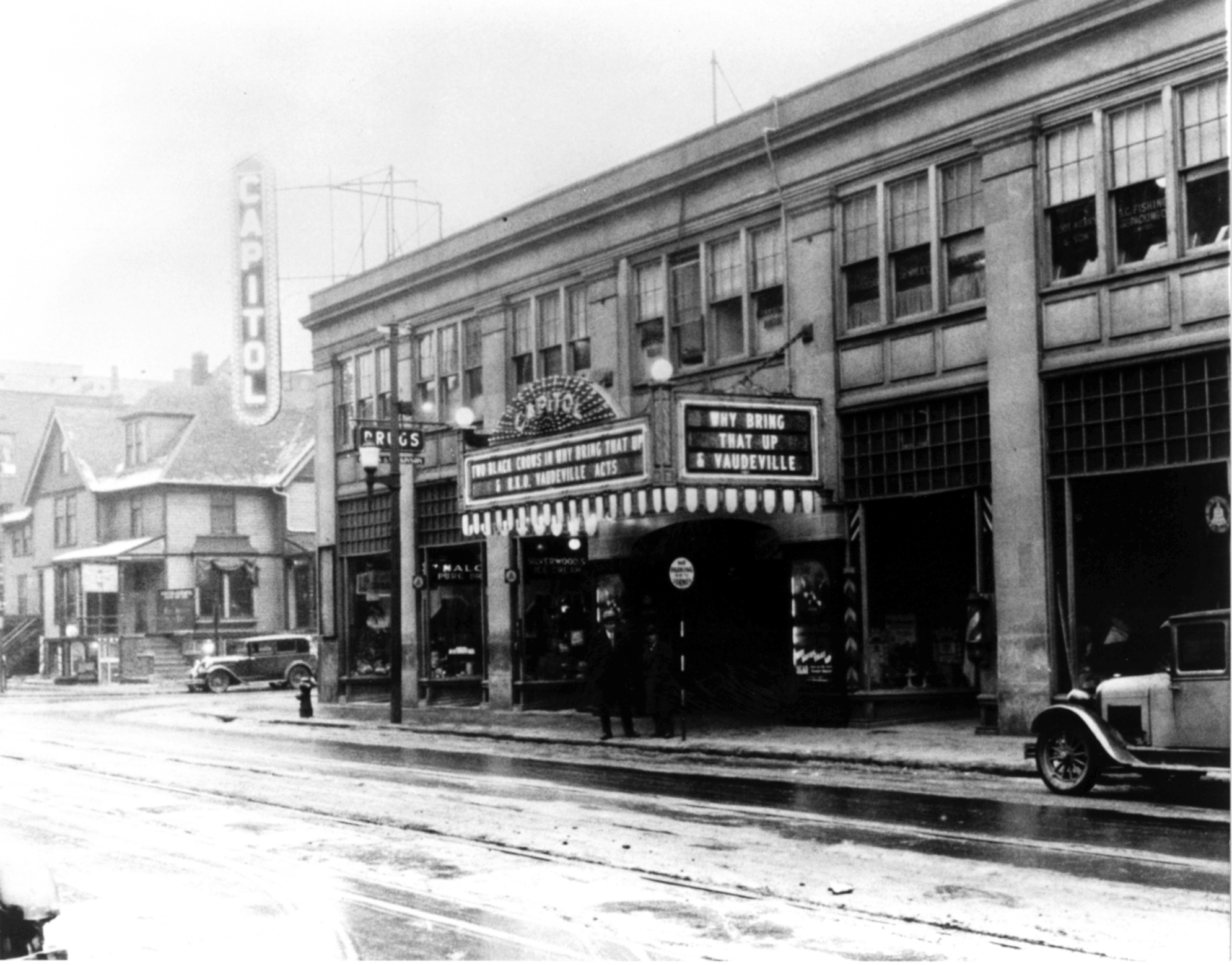
Capitol Theatre ca 1928

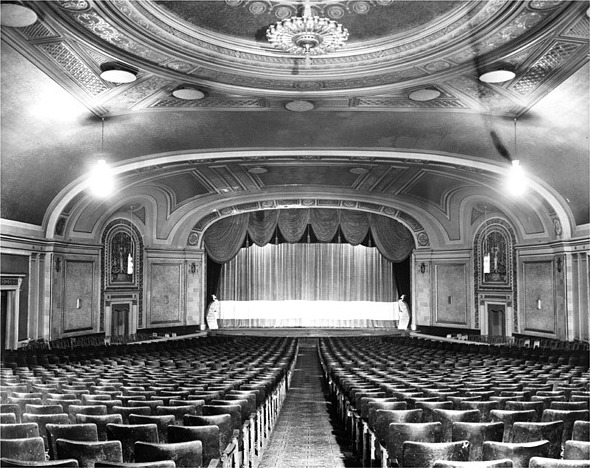
Capitol Theatre Auditorium ca 1948. Full theatre 1995 seats

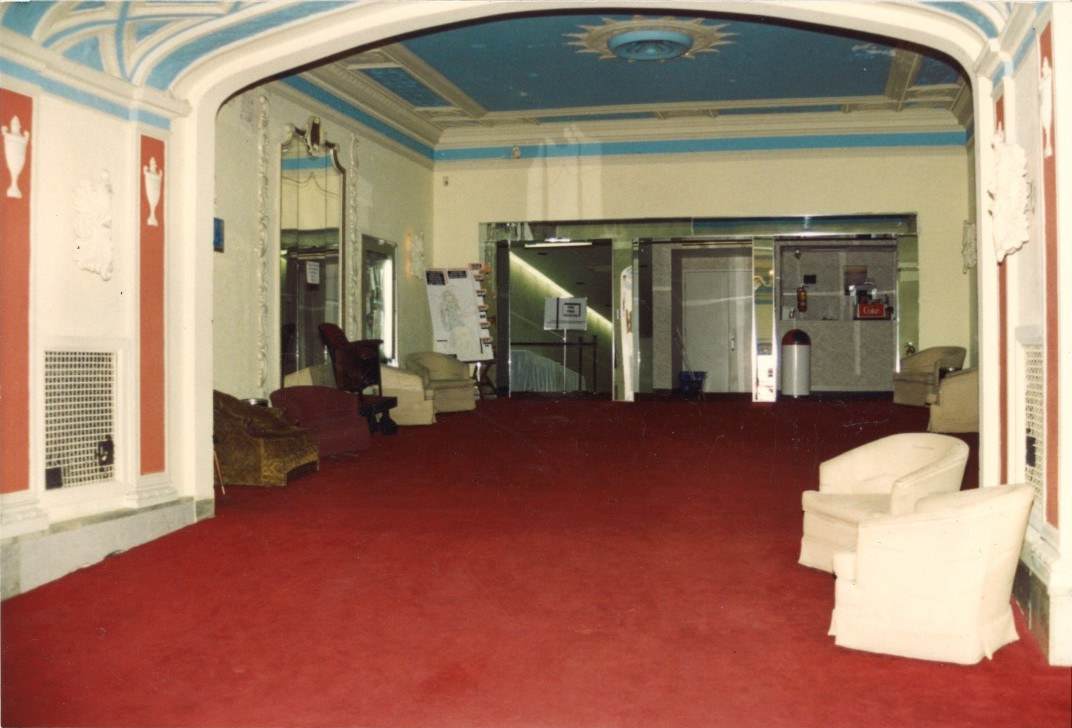
Capitol Theatre Lobby ca 1989

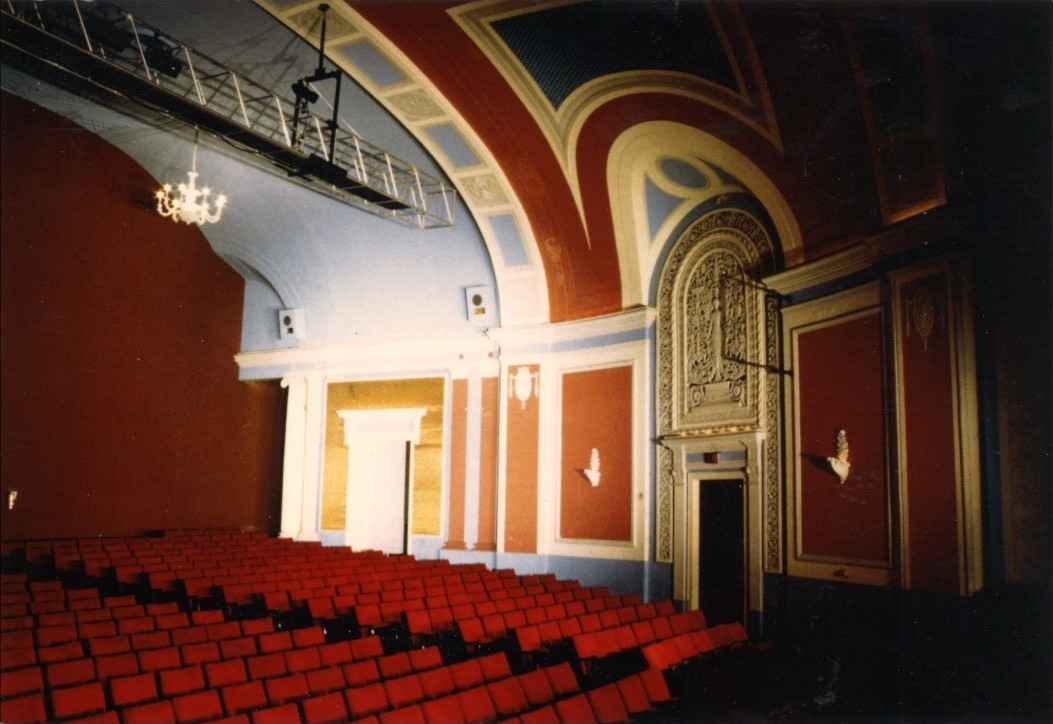
Capitol Theatre ca 1989

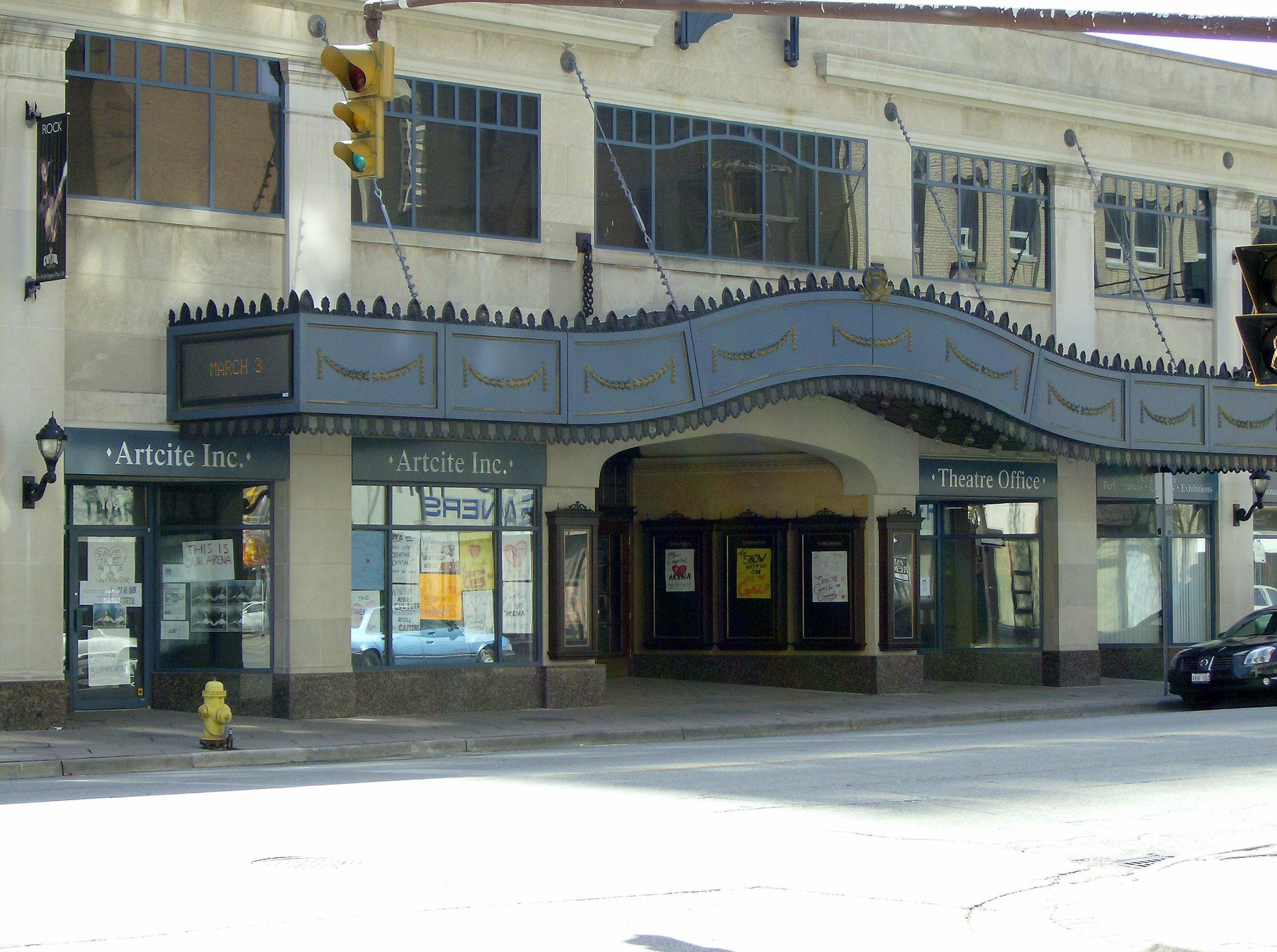
Capitol Theatre exterior 2007

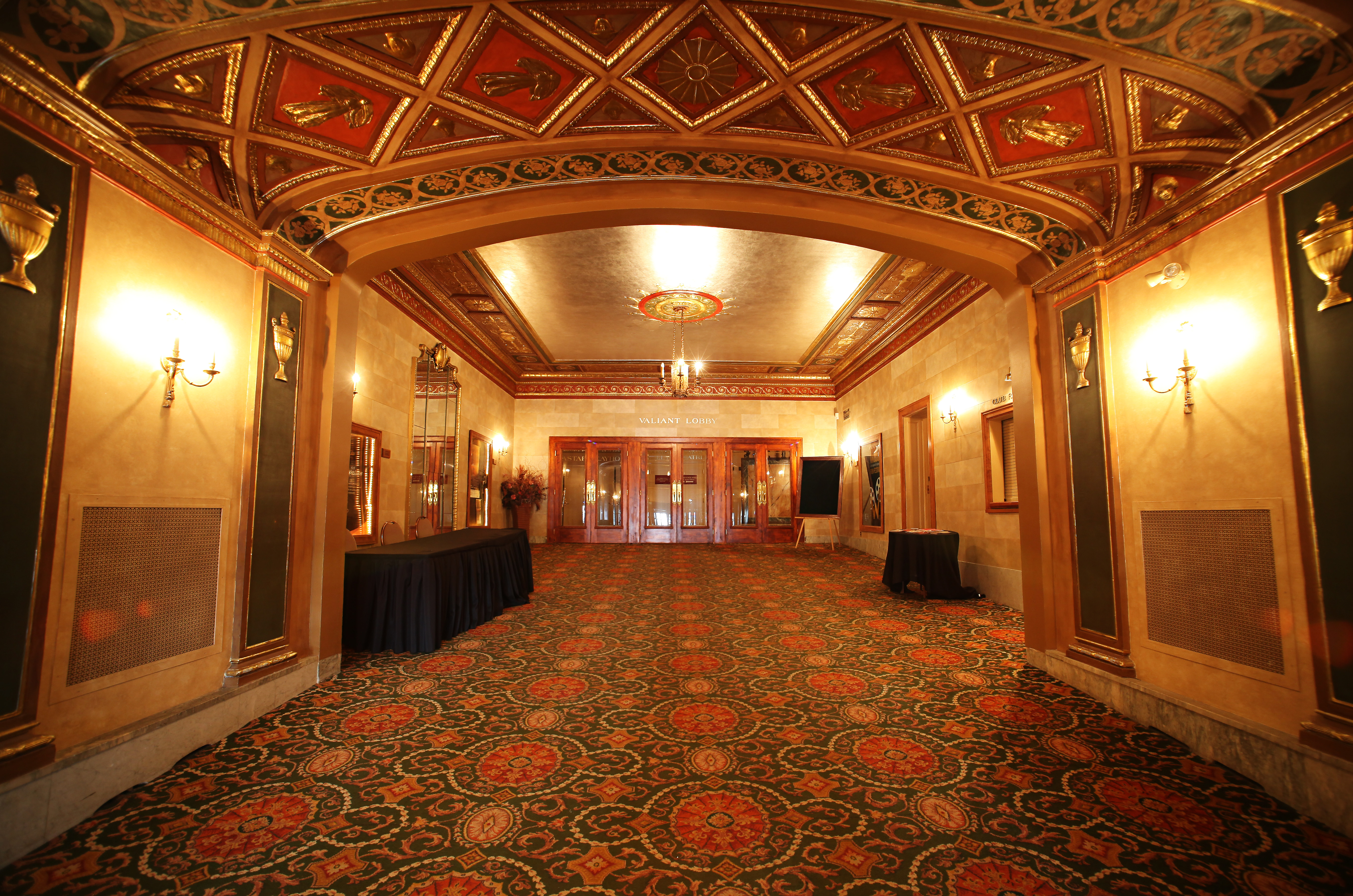
Capitol Theatre Lobby 2013

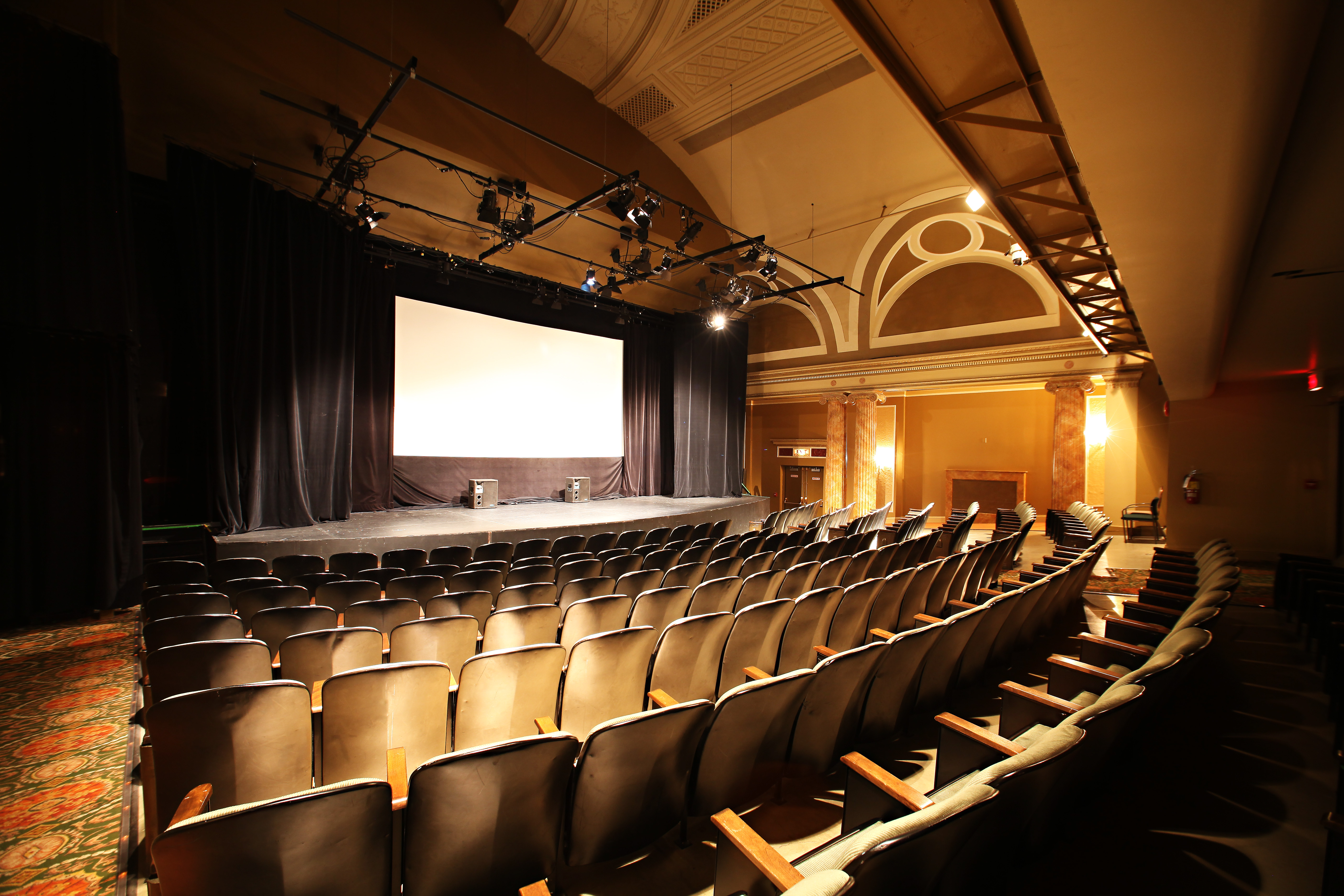
Daniel Patrick Kelly Theatre 2013

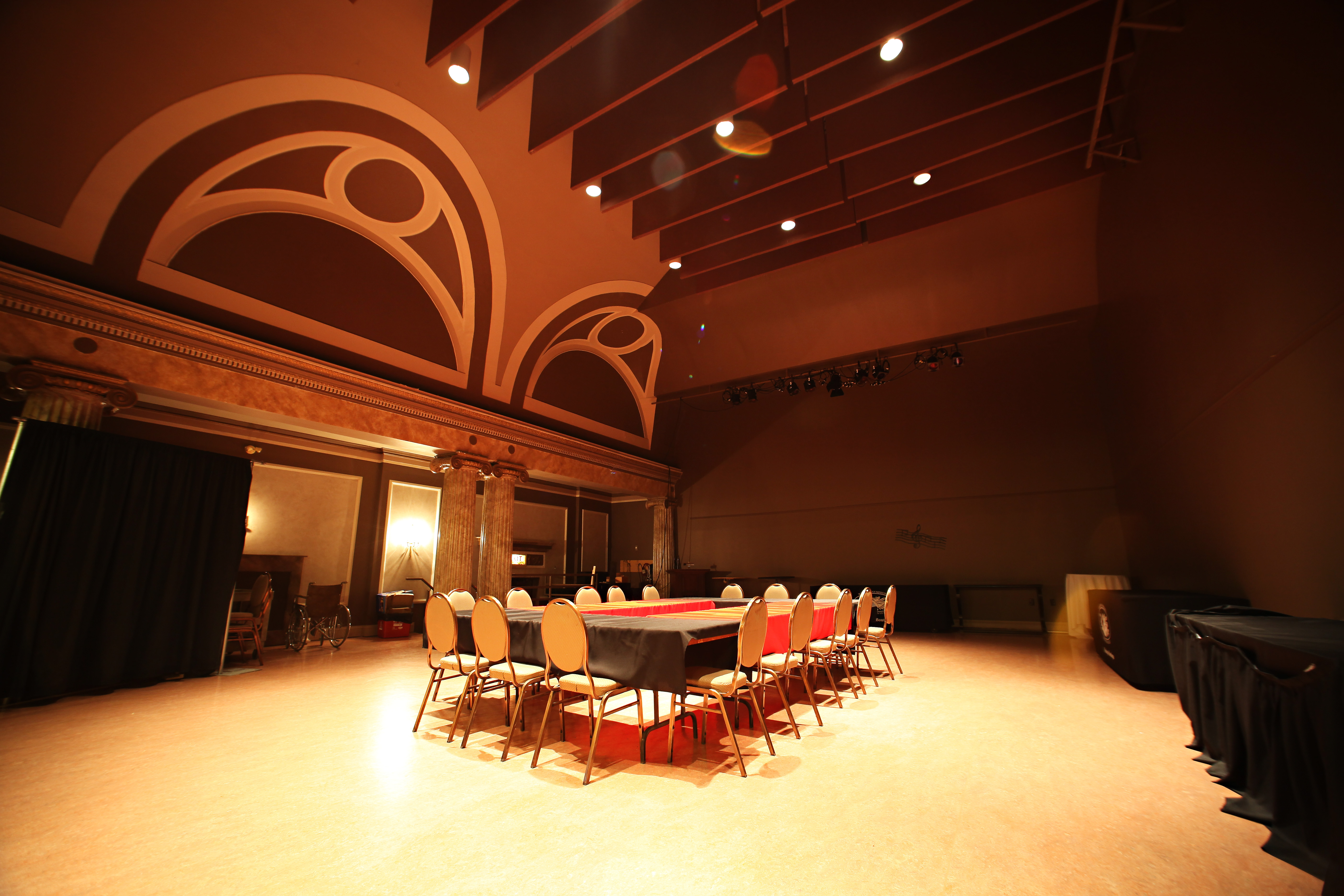
Joy Family Theatre 2013

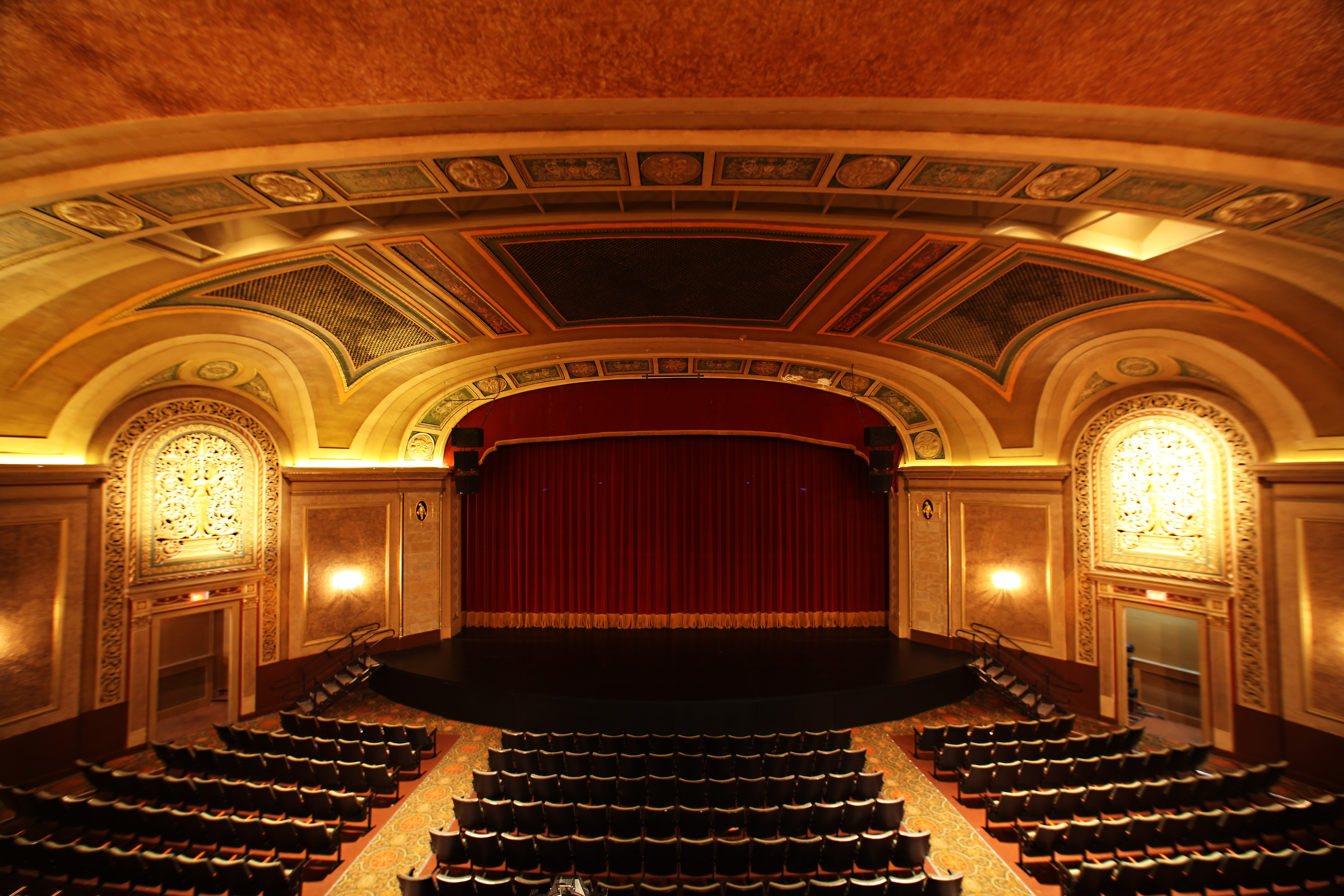
Pentastar Playhouse 2013

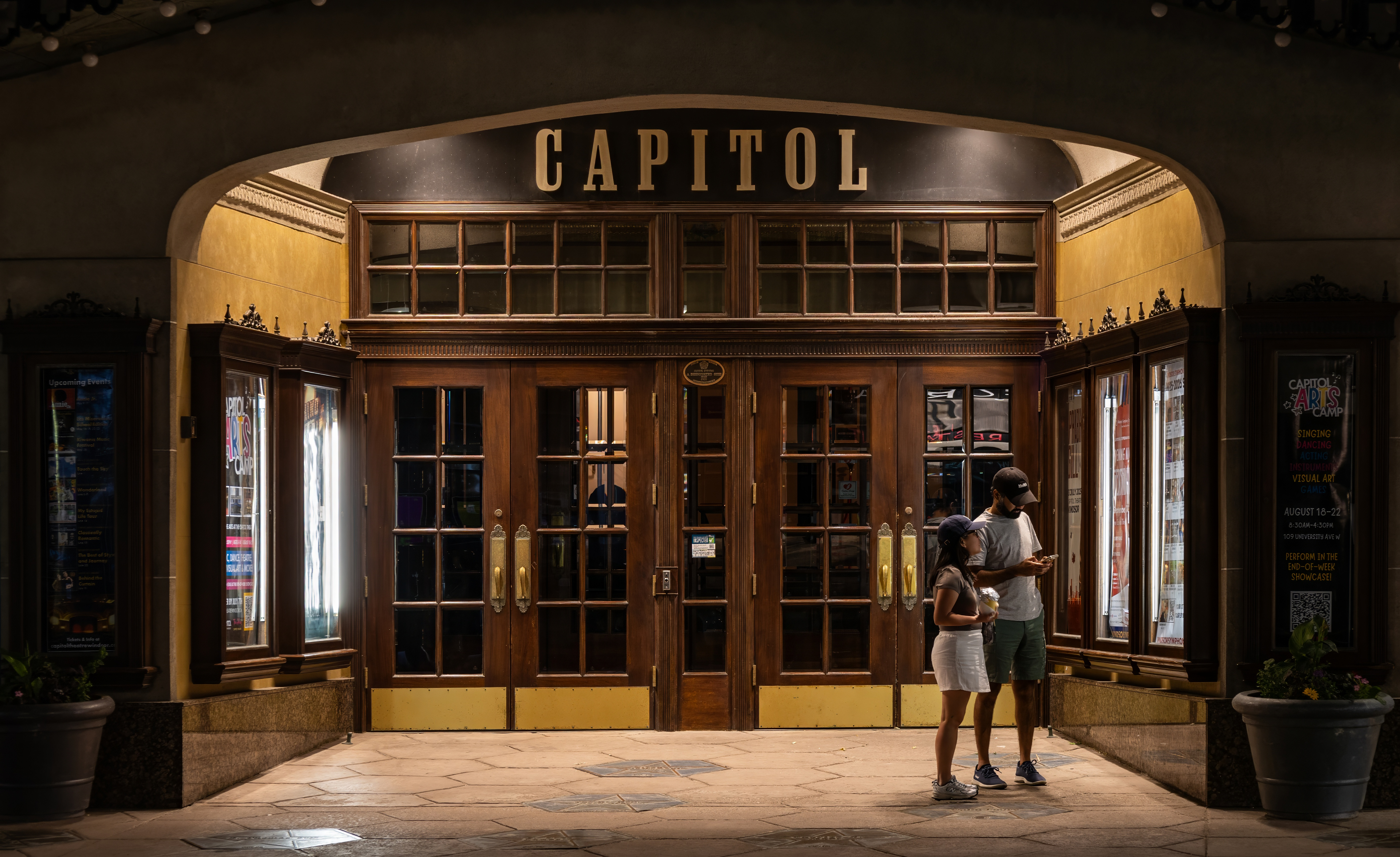
Couple viewing posters of upcoming shows outside the theatre at night
