= Akron Youth Symphony =

Founded in 1955, the Akron Youth Symphony (AYS) is the pre-professional youth orchestra affiliated with the Akron Symphony. AYS is a full symphonic ensemble that performs large-scale orchestral repertoire.

The Akron Youth Philharmonic is led by a public school music educator (currently Douglas Bayda,) while the associate conductor of the Akron Symphony serves as music director of the Akron Youth Symphony.

AYS has toured to Carnegie Hall, and has been coached and guest conducted by Akron Symphony Music Director Christopher Wilkins and conductor, educator and speaker Benjamin Zander. Notable AYS music directors have included Vincent Frittelli, Keith Lockhart and John Morris Russell.

== Repertoire ==
Repertoire performed during Levi Hammer's tenure includes major symphonies of Beethoven, Brahms, Dvorak, Haydn, Mozart, Shostakovich, Schubert and Tchaikovsky, concerti of Bach, Beethoven, Mozart, Saint-Saëns and Shostakovich, and symphonic works of Bach, Barber, Beethoven, Berlioz, Bernstein, Brahms, Copland, Debussy, Elgar, Fauré, Holst, Hindemith, Kodaly, Liszt, Mascagni, Mozart, Mussorgsky, Puccini, Ravel, Rossini, Johann Strauss Sr., Johann Strauss Jr., Stravinsky, Tchaikovsky, Verdi and Weber.

== Notable performances ==
The youth symphony has played many concerts at Akron's E. J. Thomas Hall. Most notably, however, in celebrating the 50th anniversary of the orchestra's founding, the Akron Youth Symphony played at Carnegie Hall. The orchestra has been invited by the Ohio Music Educators Association (OMEA) to play at the state conference in Cincinnati, Ohio.

== Parent organization ==
Greater Akron Musical Association, the Akron Symphony

The Akron Symphony began in 1949 when Mabel Lamborn Graham received $500 as ‘seed money’ from the publisher of the Akron Beacon Journal with the instruction to begin raising money for a professional, union orchestra. After three years of intense fundraising, the Akron Symphony's Classic Series was established in the organization's first season (1952–1953) to provide concerts by professional musicians of the highest caliber.
