= Peanuts Gallery =

1997 piano concerto by Ellen Zwilich

- Piano concerto by Ellen Taaffe Zwilich
- Based on: Peanuts characters
- Dedication: Charles M. Schulz
- Movements: 6

Premiere
- Date: March 22, 1997
- Location: Carnegie Hall
- Performers: Albert Kim; Orpheus Chamber Orchestra

Peanuts Gallery is a piano concerto by the American composer Ellen Taaffe Zwilich, inspired by the characters of the comic strip Peanuts by Charles M. Schulz, who was a friend of Zwilich. It was commissioned for the Orpheus Chamber Orchestra by the Carnegie Hall Corporation, and first performed by the pianist Albert Kim and the Orpheus Chamber Orchestra at Carnegie Hall on March 22, 1997.

Zwilich dedicated the piece to Schulz, "in hopes that it will give him a small measure of the pleasure that his Peanuts characters have given all of us."

== Background ==
Schulz first learned of Ellen Taaffe Zwilich through a profile of her on The MacNeil/Lehrer NewsHour in July 1990. In a Peanuts strip later that year, Peppermint Patty and Marcie attend a concert featuring a flute concerto which Marcie tells Patty is by Ellen Zwilich, who "happens to be a woman." Zwilich contacted Schulz to thank him and the two became friends. Thus, when Carnegie Hall asked Zwilich to write a piece of children's music, she proposed to Schulz that she would compose a work based on Peanuts characters; Schulz enthusiastically agreed.

On March 16, 1997, six days before the world premiere, Schulz once again referenced Zwilich in a Peanuts comic celebrating the new composition. In that comic, Schroeder tells Lucy about the new composition, saying "we're all in it" and naming each of the movements; looking at a copy of the score, Lucy simply responds, "My part should be longer."

The creation of Peanuts Gallery was later documented in a PBS special of the same name, featuring rare interviews with Charles M. Schulz, his wife Jean Schulz, and the composer.

== Structure ==
The concerto lasts about 13 minutes and is scored for flute, two oboes, two clarinets, two bassoons, two horns, percussion, strings, and solo piano.

Each movement is inspired by a Peanuts character:

1. Schroeder's Beethoven Fantasy
2. Lullaby for Linus
3. Snoopy Does the Samba
4. Charlie Brown's Lament
5. Lucy Freaks Out
6. Peppermint Patty and Marcie Lead the Parade

== Recording ==
A recording of Peanuts Gallery, performed by Jeffrey Biegel and the Florida State University Symphony Orchestra, and conducted by Alexander Jiménez, was released on album together with Zwilich's Images and Millennium Fantasy through Naxos Records in September 2010.
