= Cincinnati Pops Orchestra =

American pops orchestra

- Pops orchestra
- Founded: 1977
- Location: Cincinnati, Ohio
- Concert hall: Music Hall, Cincinnati
- Principal conductor: John Morris Russell

The Cincinnati Pops Orchestra is a pops orchestra based in Cincinnati, Ohio, United States, founded in 1977 out of the Cincinnati Symphony Orchestra. Its members are also the members of the Cincinnati Symphony, and the Pops is managed by the same administration. Erich Kunzel, the Pops' founding conductor, continued to lead the Pops until his death in 2009.

In 1965, maestro Max Rudolf invited Erich Kunzel, a young conductor on the faculty of Brown University, to join the Cincinnati Symphony. That October, Kunzel, a Dartmouth graduate and assistant to French conductor Pierre Monteux, conducted his first "8 O'Clock" Pops concert. Over the next four decades, the Cincinnati Pops Orchestra regularly performed for packed houses in Cincinnati's Music Hall and established worldwide recognition through tours and critically acclaimed, best-selling recordings on the Telarc label.

An estimated 30 million people have viewed eight national telecasts of the Cincinnati Pops on PBS, and the orchestra has more than 100 available recordings, 56 of which have appeared on the Billboard charts, a record unmatched by any other orchestra, and sales of over 10 million units. The Pops’ Copland: Music of America won a 1998 Grammy Award, and four other Pops recordings have been nominated for Grammy Awards.

In May 2008, the Pops received an invitation to the 2008 Summer Olympics in Beijing, the only American orchestra to play the opening weekend.

After Kunzel's death on September 1, 2009, John Morris Russell was named in December 2010 as the new director of the Pops, effective September 1, 2011.

== Selected discography ==
- Peaches and Cream, album of dances and marches by John Philip Sousa, 1984
- International Salute, collection of patriotic anthems and classical music and from around the world, 1984
- Star Tracks (1984) and Star Tracks II (1987), sci-fi/fantasy film soundtrack selections including Star Wars and Superman
- Round-Up, collection of wild west-themed folk music and movie themes, 1987
- Symphonic Spectacular, album of virtuosic classical selections such as Festive Overture by Shostakovich and Ride of the Valkyries, 1988
- Big Band Hit Parade, album of classic big band and jazz selections with guest artists including Doc Severinsen, Dave Brubeck, and Gerry Mulligan, 1988
- A Disney Spectacular, a collection of Disney songs, 1989
- Chiller, Halloween-themed film and classical selections, 1989
- Victory at Sea and Other Favorites, selections from the Victory at Sea soundtrack and other nautical-themed martial and film music, 1989
- Christmas With the Pops, 1990
- Symphonic Star Trek, collection of themes and soundtrack cues from the Star Trek franchise featuring narration by Leonard Nimoy, 1996
- Copland: The Music of America, 1997
- Tchaikovsky: 1812, album of famous works by Tchaikovsky including 1812 Overture, 2001
- The Ultimate Movie Music Collection, 4-disc album of film music selections re-released from the orchestra's previous recordings, 2005
- Super Heroes!, collection of themes from superhero movies, 2013
