= Millennium Fantasy =

Piano concerto by Ellen Taaffe Zwilich

Millennium Fantasy for Piano and Orchestra is a piano concerto written by the American composer Ellen Taaffe Zwilich. The work was commissioned by the pianist Jeffrey Biegel in association with the Adele Marcus Foundation, the Abraham J. & Phyllis Katz Foundation, the South Florida Council of the Chopin Foundation of the United States, Isa and Marvin Leibowitz, the American Music Center, and a consortium of 27 American orchestras. It was first performed by Jeffrey Biegel and the Cincinnati Symphony Orchestra under the direction of Jesús López Cobos in Cincinnati on September 22, 2000.

== Composition ==
Millennium Fantasy is cast in two movements and has a performance duration of roughly 20 minutes. The music's thematic material is based on the folk song "Come All You Fair and Tender Ladies," which Zwilich's grandmother sang to her when she was a child. In the score program note, the composer wrote, "I can still 'hear' her voice when I remember this, so I thought it would be a special pleasure to create a musical fantasy based on it."

=== Instrumentation ===
The work is scored for solo piano and a large orchestra comprising two flutes (2nd doubling piccolo), oboe, English horn, clarinet, bass clarinet, two bassoons (1st doubling contrabassoon), two horns, two trumpets, one percussionist, and strings.

== Reception ==
Reviewing the world premiere, Janelle Gelfand of The Cincinnati Enquirer wrote, "Called by Ms. Zwilich a 'reflection' of the turn of the last century, Millennium Fantasy is a substantial addition to the repertoire that could endure to the next century." She added, "In two movements, the 18-minute piece was a vibrant dialogue between piano and orchestra." Mary Ellyn Hutton of The Cincinnati Post called it "a broadly appealing work" with "meaty, flavorful construction."

== Recording ==
A recording of Millennium Fantasy, performed by Jeffrey Biegel and the Florida State University Symphony Orchestra conducted by Alexander Jiménez, was released on album together with Zwilich's Images and Peanuts Gallery through Naxos Records in September 2010.
