= Robert Franz (conductor) =

Canadian conductor (1968–2025)

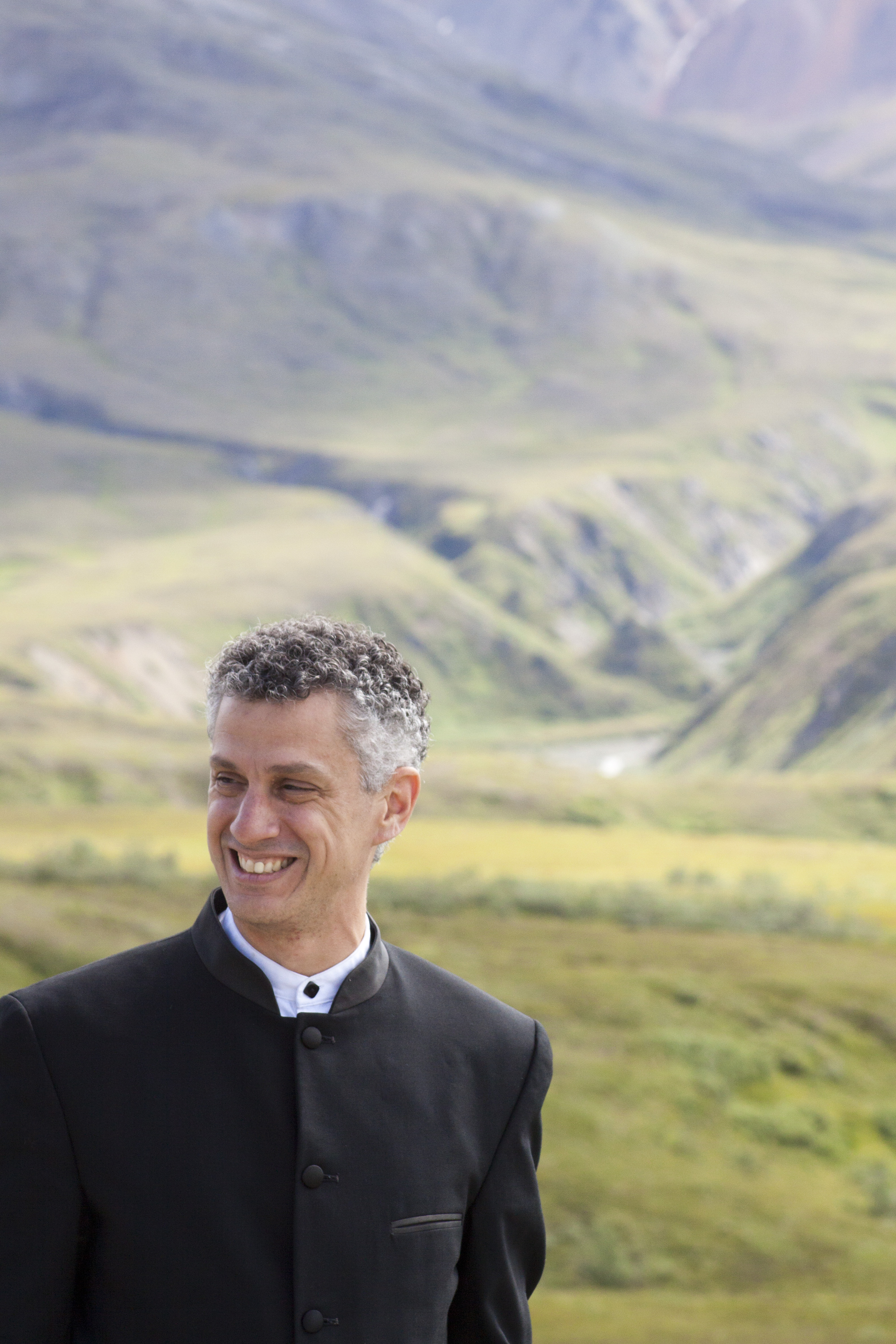
- Born: Robert John Franz Jr. March 10, 1968; Kingston, New York, U.S.
- Died: September 2, 2025 (aged 57); Windsor, Ontario, Canada
- Education: University of North Carolina School of the Arts (BMus) (MMus)
- Occupations: Conductor; music director; artistic director
- Years active: 1997–2025
- Employer: Windsor Symphony Orchestra (2013–2025)
- Spouse: Brandon Atkins (m. 2014)
- Children: 3

Robert John Franz Jr. (March 10, 1968 – September 2, 2025) was a Canadian conductor.

== Life and work ==
Franz was born on March 10, 1968 in Kingston, New York. He obtained a bachelor of music degree in oboe performance and master of music degree in conducting, both from the University of North Carolina School of the Arts School of Music.

Franz started his career in 1997, as associate conductor of the Louisville Orchestra. He held the titles of music director of the Windsor Symphony Orchestra, artistic director of the Boise Baroque Orchestra, and music director of the University of North Carolina School of the Arts Symphony Orchestra, among others.

Franz married Brandon Atkins, an epidemiologist, in November 2014, and they had three daughters. He died in Windsor, Ontario on September 2, 2025, at the age of 57, after suffering from non-Hodgkin lymphoma.
