= John Morris Russell =

American orchestral conductor (born 1960)

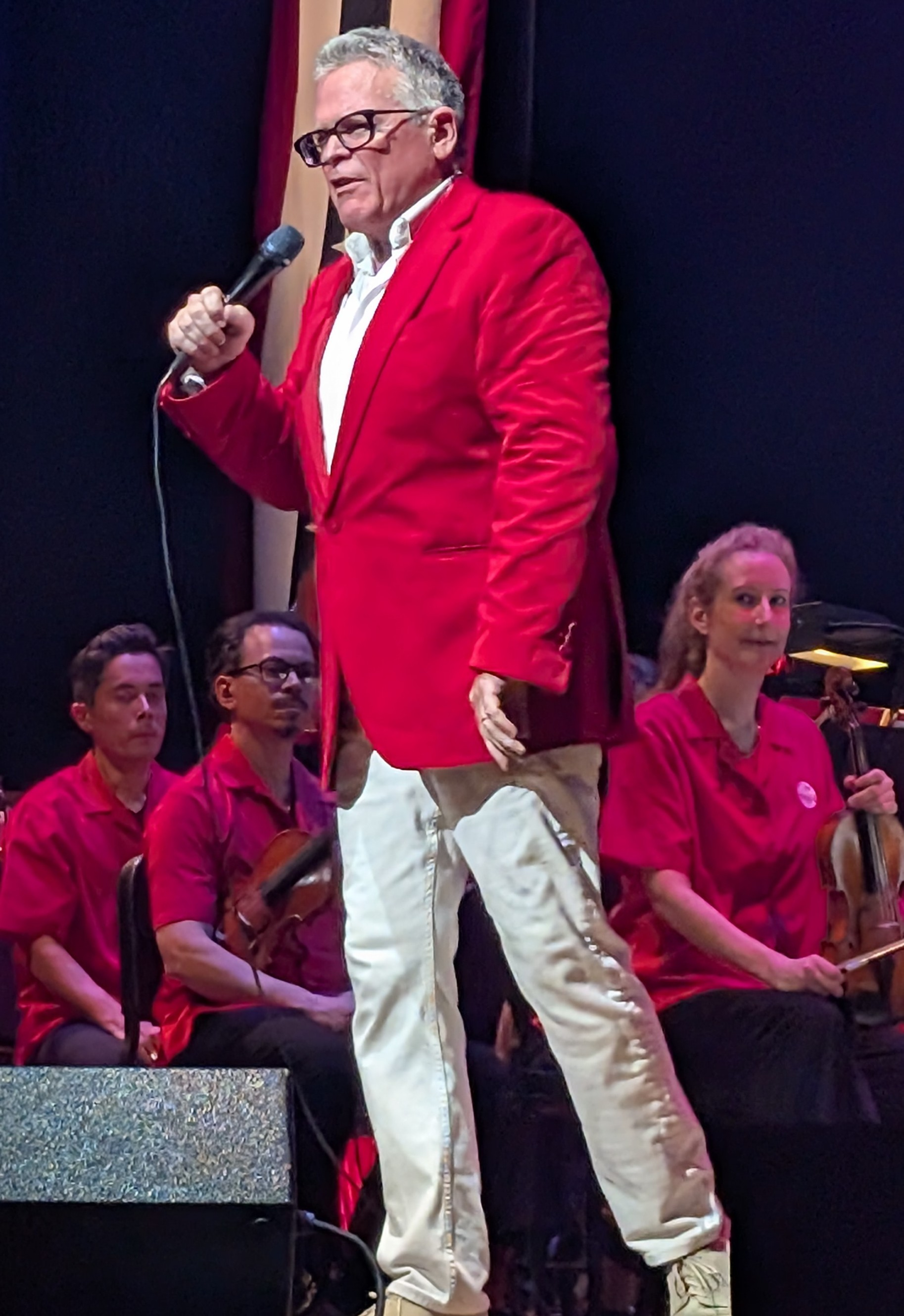
- John Morris Russell at Riverbend Music Center on July 4, 2025

Background information
- Occupation: Conductor
- Website: www.johnmorrisrussell.com

John Morris Russell, also known as JMR, is an American orchestral conductor best known for his association with the Cincinnati Pops Orchestra, the Buffalo Philharmonic Orchestra, and the Hilton Head Symphony Orchestra.

== Biography ==
=== Early years ===
Born and raised in Cleveland, Ohio, Russell attended Ludlow Elementary School in Shaker Heights, outside of Cleveland. Active in theater and music in high school at Shaker Heights High School, he played piano and trumpet in band, orchestra, jazz ensemble, and theatrical productions, and formed a "garage band" that played cover tunes from the great funk horn bands of the late 1970s. He began more seriously studying music while attending Williams College in Williamstown, Massachusetts, during which he spent a year at King's College London and the Guildhall School of Music and Drama and began taking conducting lessons. In 1982, he graduated with a B.A. cum laude with highest honors. He continued his study with private conducting lessons at the Cleveland Institute of Music. His first work as a conductor included teaching in the public schools as well as leading the Northern Ohio Youth Orchestras in Oberlin, Ohio, and the Akron Youth Symphony.

=== Education ===
He received a Master of Music degree in conducting from the University of Southern California, Los Angeles, and a Bachelor of Arts degree in music from Williams College in Massachusetts. He has also studied at the Guildhall School of Music and Drama in London, the Cleveland Institute of Music, the Aspen Music Festival in Colorado, and the Pierre Monteux School for Conductors in Hancock, Maine.

=== Conducting and Performing ===
==== Cincinnati Pops Orchestra ====
On December 6, 2010, Russell was named conductor of the Cincinnati Pops Orchestra, effective September 1, 2011, succeeding the late Erich Kunzel. As the Cincinnati Pops Conductor, Russell programs and conducts performances annually at Music Hall and Riverbend Music Center, as well as leading performances in the community and overseeing the orchestra's Lollipop Family Concerts. He will be staying with the Pops through the 2027–28 season.

==== Hilton Head Symphony Orchestra ====
Russell was named the music director and principal conductor of the Hilton Head Symphony Orchestra in March 2012. He began his season with the symphony on October 22, 2012. There he leads the classical series as well as the Hilton Head International Piano Competition.

==== Buffalo Philharmonic Orchestra ====
In April 2015, Russell was named Buffalo Philharmonic Orchestra principal pops conductor, following in the footsteps of Marvin Hamlisch and Doc Severinsen.

==== Windsor Symphony Orchestra ====
Russell served as music director of the Windsor Symphony Orchestra in Windsor, Ontario, Canada, between 2001 and 2012. He conducted performances of 45 world premieres, many under the auspices of the Windsor Canadian Music Festival, and recorded the Juno nominated album of Prokofiev's Peter and the Wolf. During his time with the WSO, he was a two-time recipient of Ontario's Lieutenant Governor's Award for the Arts. In May 2011, the University of Windsor awarded him an honorary degree for his contributions to the growth and invigoration in musical life in Windsor, Ontario.

==== Guest conductor ====
As a guest conductor, Russell has led many of North America's most distinguished ensembles, including the orchestras of Toronto, Edmonton, Calgary, Victoria, Kitchener-Waterloo, Detroit, Houston, Indianapolis, Dallas, Louisville, Boston Pops, The Cleveland Orchestra, Orchestra London, Miami's New World Symphony, the Minnesota Orchestra, Oregon Symphony, Colorado Symphony, New Jersey Symphony, New York Pops, New York City Ballet, New York Philharmonic and the Los Angeles Philharmonic.

Russell was associate conductor of the Cincinnati Symphony Orchestra from 1995 to 2006 where he regularly led concerts at Music Hall and the Riverbend Music Center and worked with Lopez Cobos, Paavo Jaarvi, and Erich Kunzel, the latter of whom he succeeded in 2012. He created the Classical Roots series, which continues to celebrate the music of African-American composers and performers in Music Hall and area churches, where he has worked alongside Cynthia Erivo, Common, Marvin Winans, George Shirley, and Alton Fitzgerald White. He was also the co-creator of the Christmas spectacular, Home for the Holidays. In September 1999, Russell replaced Maestro Kunzel with an hour's notice to conduct the Cincinnati Pops' opening weekend concerts. The following week he substituted for Mo. Kunzel in concerts on the stage of the famed Musikverein in Vienna, featuring the Harlem Boychoir, the Vienna Choir Boys and actor Gregory Peck. The performance continues to be televised throughout Europe, Japan and in the USA on PBS. Maestro Russell returned to conduct the Cincinnati Pops twice in 2010. Maestro Russell has also served as associate conductor of the Savannah Symphony Orchestra, director of the orchestral program at Vanderbilt University, and music director with the College Light Opera Company in Falmouth, Massachusetts, where his associate conductors included Georgia Stitt and Eric Whitacre.

=== Reputation ===
==== Awards ====
In 2020, Russell's recording with the Cincinnati Pops American Originals: 1918 was nominated for a Grammy Award for Best Classical Compendium. A two-time recipient of Ontario's Lieutenant Governor's Award for the Arts, as well as the Ontario Arts Council's Vida Peene Award for Artistic Excellence, Maestro Russell and the WSO also won coveted nominations for both the Gemini Awards (2004) and Juno Awards (2008). In 2010, Russell received the Herb Gray Harmony Award by the Multicultural Council of Windsor and Essex County, in recognition of the WSO's programming and outreach activities that support and celebrate the region's diversity, as well as Russell's strategies to encourage a harmonious society. In October 2010, he was honored as the first recipient of the Arts Leadership Award by the Windsor Endowment for the Arts, in recognition of the contribution he has made to the region's cultural life.

==== Radio and television ====
The Windsor Symphony Orchestra has made seventeen national broadcasts on CBC Radio 2 with Maestro Russell, including concerts from the Masterworks and Intimate Classics series, and the annual Windsor Canadian Music Festival. The most recent CBC broadcast recording of Aurora Borealis by Jordon Nobles, was selected to represent Canada in the 57th annual International Rostrum of Composers in Lisbon, Portugal in June 2010. The WSO's first nationally televised production was created with Mr. Russell for the CBC Television series Opening Night, which subsequently won the Gold Worldmedal for "Best Performance Program" at the New York Festivals Awards for Television and New Media, as well as a Gemini Award Nomination.

==== Recordings ====
JMR has contributed seven albums to the Cincinnati Pops Orchestra discography. In 2018, he created the "American Originals Project" which has won both critical and popular acclaim in two landmark recordings: American Originals (the music of Stephen Foster); and the Grammy nominated American Originals 1918 (a tribute to the dawn of the jazz age). The 2020 "American Originals" concert, King Records and the Cincinnati Sound featured pianist Paul Shaffer celebrating a half-century of recordings produced in the Queen City. All of Maestro Russell's albums with the Cincinnati Pops Orchestra were recorded in Music Hall (Cincinnati), released on the Fanfare Cincinnati label, and distributed by Naxos Records.

In 2006 the Windsor Symphony Orchestra released Prokofiev's Peter and the Wolf narrated by actor Colm Feore, and Last Minute Lulu, composed by WSO Composer-in-Residence, Brent Lee, with text by the Newbery Medal winning author, Christopher Paul Curtis. The recording won Russell and the WSO its first Juno nomination for Best Children's Album in 2008.

Russell's American Soundscapes video series with The Pops and Cincinnati's CET Public Television has surpassed one million views on YouTube since its launch in 2016.

==== Educational concerts ====
The "Sound Discoveries" series Russell developed with the Cincinnati Symphony Orchestra is a model for educational concerts. In Windsor, he crafted two new concert series, Peanut Butter n' Jam and Family Jamboree, specifically for youth and families, and spearheaded the creation of The Windsor-Essex Youth Choir and the Windsor Symphony Youth Orchestra. Russell's support of music in the schools has forged performance partnerships with the University of Windsor School of Music, the Windsor Centre for the Creative Arts and choral, dance and performing ensembles. With the creation of the One Community—One Symphony project in 2008, Russell has worked with over a thousand teenagers in 15 school band and choral programs, representing French, Catholic and Public School Boards, in rehearsals and performances with the WSO.

During his tenure with WSO, his educational concerts engaged more than 100,000 students and teachers in Essex, Lambton and Kent counties. Russell has helped nurture many new voices in Canadian music, conducting numerous Windsor premiers of important Canadian works and over 45 world premieres of commissioned compositions. He created the WSO's first multi-year composer-in-residence position, and is deeply involved in the production of the annual Windsor Canadian Music Festival, described by CBC producer David Jaeger as, "one of the most exciting and innovative developments to appear lately in the Canadian musical scene."

== Discography ==
- JOY!, Live from Music Hall, Cincinnati Pops Orchestra (2023)
- Scott Davenport Richards: Blind Injustice, Cincinnati Opera (2021)
- Voyage: A Musical Journey of Exploration and Imagination, Cincinnati Pops (2019)
- American Originals 1918: Rhiannon Giddens, Pokey Lafarge, and Steep Canyon Rangers, Cincinnati Pops (2018) (GRAMMY^{®} Nomination)
- American Originals: Rosanne Cash, Joe Henry, over the Rhine, Dom Flemons, Aoife O'Donovan, and Cincinnati's own Comet Bluegrass All-stars, Cincinnati Pops (2015)
- Saint-Saëns: Carnival of the Animals, Cincinnati Pops (2014)
- Superheroes! featuring Adam West, Cincinnati Pops (2013)
- Home for the Holidays: Cincinnati May Festival Chorus, Rodrick Dixon, Brian Stokes Mitchell, and New York Voices, Cincinnati Pops (2012)
- Prokoviev & Brent Lee: Peter and the Wolf & Last Minute Lulu, Windsor Symphony Orchestra (2006) (Juno Nomination)
