= Windsor Symphony Orchestra =

Canadian orchestra

- Orchestra
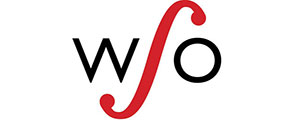
- Former name: Windsor Concert Orchestra
- Founded: 1941
- Location: Windsor, Ontario
- Concert hall: Capitol Theatre
- Website: www.windsorsymphony.com

The Windsor Symphony Orchestra is a Canadian orchestra located in Windsor, Ontario. The orchestra performs in Southwestern Ontario, at the Capitol Theatre, Home of the WSO.

== History ==
The Windsor Symphony Orchestra was founded in 1941, originally as the Windsor Concert Orchestra. The name was changed to The Windsor Symphony in 1948. The orchestra’s first conductor was Matti Holli, who remained with the orchestra until his death in 1977.

The most recent Canadian conductor to be appointed as music director was Dwight Bennett in 1986. Under Bennett, the orchestra became fully professional but also ran into financial difficulties through unrealized revenue projections and a musician's strike in 1988. He was succeeded by American conductor Susan Haig in 1991. Music director from 2001 to 2012 was American conductor John Morris Russell. During his tenure, the orchestra received a Juno nomination for their recording of Peter and the Wolf & Last Minute Lulu. The orchestra also earned several other awards, including two Ontario Lieutenant Governor's awards for the arts. He conducted his last concert as music director on May 12, 2012. On February 26, 2013, the Windsor Symphony Orchestra announced the appointment of Robert Franz as their sixth music director. Franz is the third American conductor to be appointed to the position. Franz died of non-Hodgkin lymphoma on September 2, 2025.

The Windsor Symphony Orchestra performs at several venues in the Windsor-Essex County area but, since the beginning of the 2012–2013 season, is primarily based at the historic Capitol Theatre in downtown Windsor, a restored former movie house.

== Music directors ==
1947–1977	Maestro Matti Holli
1979–1985	Maestro Laszlo Gati
1986–1990	Maestro Dwight Bennett
1991–2000	Maestra Susan Haig
2001–2012	Maestro John Morris Russell
2013–2025	Maestro Robert Franz

== Concerts and programs ==
=== Main stage ===
Annually, the Windsor Symphony Orchestra stages 4 to 5 programmes with full orchestra in its "Masterworks" series and 4 to 5 Pops programmes, each performed at the historic Capitol Theatre in Windsor. The WSO also has 4 to 5 chamber orchestra programmes in its "Intimate Classics" series performed in Windsor, Leamington and Tecumseh, Ontario.

=== Chorus ===
The Windsor Symphony Orchestra Chorus was created in 1988 as a choral group directly affiliated with the orchestra. Previously, the orchestra would perform alongside the Windsor Classic Chorale and groups from Windsor and Leamington. The Chorus, which is volunteer and by audition, performs several concerts throughout the season at the Capitol Theatre as well as at UW Assumption University Chapel, covering classical as well as contemporary and pop music. The current chorusmaster is Bruce Kotowich.

=== Community outreach ===
==== Music For Health ====
The WSO Music for Health program provides live musical performances for residents and healthcare workers in long-term care facilities, retirement homes, hospitals, and other social service agencies in Windsor-Essex County. During the COVID-19 pandemic, the WSO worked with healthcare facilities to provide access to digital performances.

==== Neighbourhood Concerts ====
The Windsor Symphony regularly performs in the community in local parks and neighbourhoods. The WSO also works with community groups and organizations to perform at fundraisers and events.

=== Education initiatives ===
==== Education Concert Series ====
The Education Concert Series consists of three concert programmes designed kindergarten to grade three; grades four to six, and grades seven to twelve. The concerts are developed to be interactive and often feature young performers as soloists.

==== Family Concerts ====
The WSO's Family Concert series is an interactive and engaging introduction to music for young children ages 2–6 and their families. Music hosts guide children in exploration of classic melodies, orchestral families, traditional songs, art, story telling and magic.

==== Read-Aloud with the WSO! ====
Read-Aloud is a digital library of children's stories narrated by WSO Conductor Robert Franz, former Assistant Conductor Daniel Wiley, and various community guests. The short videos are designed for children aged 4–10.

==== Windsor Symphony Youth Orchestra ====
Created in 2004, the Windsor Symphony Youth Orchestra (WSYO) gives Students between the age of 12–20 the opportunity to rehearse and perform orchestral music in an orchestral setting under professional direction. The WSYO performs 3–5 concerts annually including Side-by-Side performance with the Windsor Symphony Orchestra.

== Awards and accolades ==
- 2010 – Windsor Endowment for the Arts (WEA) Award to Arts Organizations given to the Armouries Redevelopment Committee; WEA Arts Leadership Award for Performing Arts to John Morris Russell; Herb Gray Harmony Award to John Morris Russell in recognition of the WSO's programming and outreach activities that consistently support and celebrate the region's cultural diversity; A recording by CBC Radio 2 of the Windsor Canadian Music Festival performance by the WSO of composer Jordan Nobles' work Aurora Borealis selected to represent Canada at the International Rostrum of Composers in Lisbon.
- 2008 – Juno Award nomination for the recording of Peter and the Wolf & Last Minute Lulu; Orchestras Canada Betty Webster Award presented to persons who, over the long term, make a difference in the Canadian orchestral community, given to former Executive Director Mina Grossman Ianni.
- 2007 – Vide Peene Fund Orchestra Award
- 2006 – 5 out of 5 stars from Rick Phillips, CBC's Sound Advice for Peter and the Wolf & Last Minute Lulu
- 2004 – Gold World medal, New York Festivals Awards for Television and New Media
- 2004 – Gemini Award nomination for performance on CBC's Opening Night
- 2001 & 2003 – Ontario Lieutenant-Governor's Award for the Arts

== Discography ==
- Christmas, eh? – Robert Franz, conductor, 2022. With narration by Peter Mansbridge
- Symphronica – John Morris Russell, conductor, 2013. With jazz pianist Ron Davis
- Peter and the Wolf and Last Minute Lulu – John Morris Russell, conductor, 2006. With narration by Colm Feore and Christopher Paul Curtis. Compositions by Sergei Prokofiev and Brent Lee
- Wolfgang Amadeus Mozart: Symphony No. 33, The Magic Flute Overture, Vorrei spiegarvi; Joseph Haydn: Symphony No. 82 – Susan Haig, conductor, 1999

== World premieres ==
The Windsor Symphony Orchestra has presented over 40 World Premieres since 2001. This includes 29 works commissioned by the WSO (made possible through a grant by Canada Council for the Arts).

Year	Composer	Piece	Premiere	Commissioned
2000-01	Grossi, Jason	Gestures	Canadian Premier	
2000-01	Kovarik, Christopher	Morning Commute	World Premier	
2000-01	Kuzmenko, Larysa	Concerto for Piano & Percussion	World Premier	
2001-02	Kovarik, Christopher	Sinfonietta	World Premier	WSO Commissioned
2001-02	Malcom, Trevor	One Hundred Thirty Something Point 5	World Premier	WSO Commissioned
2001-02	McIntrye, Paul	Requiescantin Pace	World Premier	
2003-04	Currie, Neil	Sentiment Number 3	World Premier	WSO Commissioned
2003-04	Hatch, Peter	Crystal Fragments	World Premier	WSO Commissioned
2003-04	Lee, Brent	Voca me cum benedictus	World Premier	WSO Commissioned
2003-04	Lee, Brent	Like Breath	World Premier	
2003-04	Lee, Brent	Last Minute Lulu	World Premier	WSO Commissioned
2003-04	Lee, Brent	Gatineau River	World Premier	WSO Commissioned
2003-04	Palmer, Juliet	Swerve	World Premier	
2003-04	Rosen, Robert	Art of Aqueducts	World Premier	WSO Commissioned
2003-04	Wiebe, Peter	Movimento for Strings	World Premier	WSO Commissioned
2003-04	Yzeiri, Besnik	Potpuri	World Premier	WSO Commissioned
2003-04	Currie, Niel	Sentiment Number 3	World Premier	WSO Commissioned
2003-04	Hatch, Peter	Crystal Fragmanets	World Premier	WSO Commissioned
2003-04	Rosen, Robert	Art of Aqueducts	World Premier	WSO Commissioned
2004-05	Frehner, Paul	Tightrope: For 3 Accordions and Orchestra	World Premier	WSO Commissioned
2004-05	Lee, Brent	Selvage for Orchestra and Midi	World Premier	WSO Commissioned
2004-05	Lee, Brent	Iron Horses	World Premier	WSO Commissioned
2004-05	Lee, Brent	Stone and Star	World Premier	
2004-05	Lee, Brent	Equinox Below	World Premier	WSO Commissioned
2004-05	Roi, Micheline	Tengo Que Decir	World Premier	WSO Commissioned
2005-06	Korndorf, Nikolai	Let the Earth Bring Forth	North American Premier	
2005-06	Lee, Brent	Symphony No. 1 (Chorea)	World Premier	WSO Commissioned
2005-06	Lee, Brent	Trance Phatty Acid	World Premier	WSO Commissioned
2005-06	Lee, Brent	Arcadia	World Premier	WSO Commissioned
2005-06	Lee, Brent	Luminous Night	World Premier	
2005-06	Morlock, Jocelyn	Music of the Romantic Era	World Premier	
2005-06	Yusupova, Iraida	On My Way to Damascus	World Premier	
2006-07	Abram, John	Kitchenette	World Premier	WSO Commissioned
2006-07	Godin, Scott	O Sweet Spontaneous	World Premier	WSO Commissioned
2006-07	Oesterle, Michael	Perennials	World Premier	WSO Commissioned
2006-07	Oliver, John	Face in the Abstract	World Premier	WSO Commissioned
2006-07	Smith, Linda	Burnt Umber	World Premier	WSO Commissioned
2008-09	Kuster, Kristin	Beneath this Stone	Canadian Premier	
2008-09	Lee, Brent	Ruck N' Roll for Electric Viola and Orchestra	World Premier	WSO Commissioned
2008-09	Marwood, Shelley	Of Such Ecstatic Sound	World Premier	WSO Commissioned
2008-09	Plowman, Michael Richard	Journey to the Center	World Premier	WSO Commissioned
2008-09	Santos, Erik	Symphony No. 1 "Shards"	Canadian Premier	
2019	Poupel, Farhad	Zayande-rud for string orchestra	Canadian Premier	
