= Keith Lockhart =

American conductor

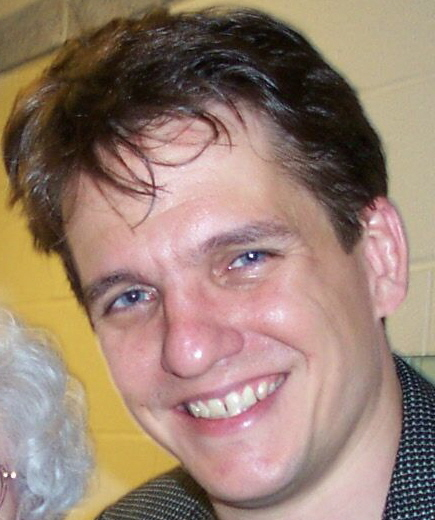
- Lockhart in 2003

Background information
- Born: Keith Alan Lockhart; Poughkeepsie, New York, U.S.
- Occupation: Orchestra conductor
- Years active: 1989–present

Keith Alan Lockhart is an American conductor. He is the conductor of the Boston Pops orchestra, and the artistic director of the Brevard Music Center in North Carolina.

Keith Lockhart, the conductor, is the brother of Paul Lockhart, the military historian—who is not to be confused with Paul Lockhart, the author of A Mathematician's Lament, nor with Paul Lockhart, the NASA engineer/astronaut.

== Early life ==
Lockhart is the elder of two children born to Newton Frederick and Marilyn Jean (Woodyard) Lockhart, who worked as computer professionals. He grew up in nearby Wappingers Falls and was educated in the public schools of New York's Dutchess County. He began studying piano at age seven. Lockhart graduated in 1981 from Furman University with a double major in German and piano performance. After transitioning from piano, he got a master's degree in orchestral conducting from Carnegie Mellon University. Lockhart was initiated into Phi Mu Alpha Sinfonia fraternity in 1978 by the Gamma Eta chapter at Furman University.

== Musical career ==
From 1988 to 1990, Lockhart served as assistant conductor of the Akron Symphony Orchestra, and as the conductor of the Akron Youth Symphony.

Lockhart was appointed conductor of the Boston Pops in 1995. He has conducted more than 1,900 Pops concerts, most of which have taken place during the orchestra's spring and holiday seasons in Boston's historic Symphony Hall. Lockhart has also led annual Boston Pops appearances at Tanglewood, 43 national tours to more than 150 cities in 38 states, and four international tours to Japan and Korea.

He and the Pops have made 79 television shows for the long-running television show Evening at Pops and participated in sporting events such as Super Bowl XXXVI, the 2008 NBA finals, the 2013 Boston Red Sox Ring Ceremony, the Red Sox Opening Day game at Fenway Park in 2009, and Game 2 of the 2018 World Series at Fenway Park. The annual July 4th Boston Pops Fireworks Spectacular draws a live audience of over half a million to the Charles River Esplanade and millions more who view it on television or live webcast.

Lockhart and the Boston Pops have recorded eight albums for the RCA Victor label, including two—The Celtic Album and The Latin Album—that earned Grammy nominations. Recent releases on Boston Pops Recordings include The Red Sox Album, A Boston Pops Christmas: Live from Symphony Hall, and The Dream Lives On: A Portrait of the Kennedy Brothers, which was a Boston Pops commission premiered in 2010 during the orchestra's 125th season. Released at the beginning of the 2017 Pops season, Lights, Camera … Music! Six Decades of John Williams features Keith Lockhart leading the Boston Pops in a collection of Williams compositions from the 1960s onward, some of which can be considered rarities.

From 1998 to 2009, Lockhart was also the music director of the Utah Symphony where he conducted three “Salute to the Symphony” television specials broadcast, one of which received an Emmy award. He conducted The Star-Spangled Banner in the opening ceremonies of the 2002 Olympic Winter Games in Salt Lake City.

In 2010, Lockhart became the principal conductor of the BBC Concert Orchestra. He concluded his tenure at the end of December 2017, and took the title of chief guest conductor of the orchestra, effective from January 2018 until November 2019. Lockhart is also the Artistic Director of the Brevard Music Center summer institute and festival, a program which he attended as an adolescent.

Keith Lockhart has conducted nearly every major orchestra in North America as well as the Royal Concertgebouw Orchestra, the Deutsches Symphonie-Orchester Berlin, the NHK Symphony in Tokyo and the Melbourne Symphony Orchestra. In October 2012, he made his London Philharmonic debut in Royal Albert Hall. In the opera pit, Maestro Lockhart has conducted productions with the Atlanta Opera, Washington Opera, Boston Lyric Opera, and Utah Opera. 2015–2016 included debut appearances with the Czech Philharmonic, the Orchestra dell'Accademia Nazionale di Santa Cecilia in Rome, the Vienna Radio Symphony, and the Hong Kong Philharmonic. He also completed a recording of the Bernstein Serenade with violinist Anne Akiko Meyers and the London Symphony Orchestra.

== Personal life ==
Lockhart has been married three times. His first marriage was to his college sweetheart, Ann Louise Heatherington, after he graduated from Furman University. The couple divorced two years later. In 1996, Lockhart married Boston Symphony violinist Lucia Lin. The marriage produced one son, Aaron, born in 2003. The couple divorced in 2005.

In 2007, Lockhart married his current wife, lawyer Emiley Zalesky.

== Awards and nominations ==
Lockhart received the Bob Hope Patriot Award from the Congressional Medal of Honor Society in 2006 and was recipient of the 2017 Commonwealth Award, the highest cultural honor bestowed by the state of Massachusetts.

Cultural offices
Preceded by John Williams	Music Director, Boston Pops orchestra 1995–present	Succeeded by incumbent
Preceded by Barry Wordsworth	Principal Conductor, BBC Concert Orchestra; 2010–2017	Succeeded by Bramwell Tovey
