= Zhou Tian =

Chinese-American composer (born 1981)

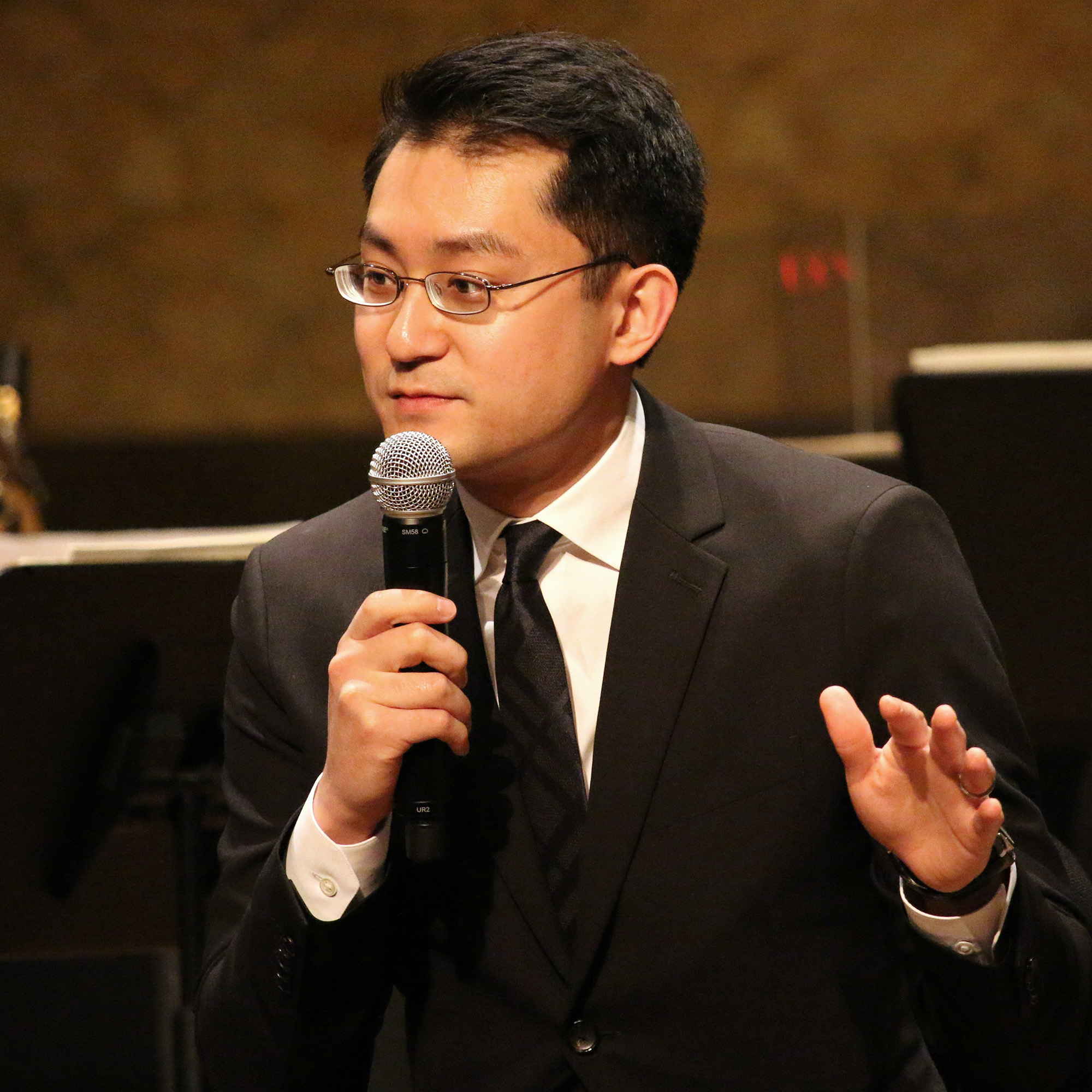
- Zhou Tian giving a pre-concert talk at Princeton University

Background information
- Born: December 22, 1981 (age 44); Hangzhou, China
- Occupations: composer, academic

Zhou Tian (JOH TEE-en; Chinese: 周天; born 1981) is a Chinese-American composer of contemporary classical music. His Concerto for Orchestra received a Grammy Award nomination for Best Contemporary Classical Composition in 2018, making him the first Chinese-born composer and the second Asian composer (following Tōru Takemitsu in 1995) honored in that category.

His compositions have been performed by performers and orchestras such as Louis Langrée, Jaap Van Zweden, Manfred Honeck, Long Yu, Yuja Wang, Noah Bendix-Balgley, Jian Wang, the New York Philharmonic, San Francisco Symphony, London Philharmonic, Mahler Chamber Orchestra, Pittsburgh Symphony, United States Marine Band, Tokyo Kosei Wind Orchestra, Dover Quartet, and the Shanghai Symphony Orchestra, where he served as the Artist-in-Residence. In 2019, thirteen American symphony orchestras jointly commissioned “Transcend” in honor of the 150th anniversary of the Transcontinental Railroad's completion. That same year, the Beijing Music Festival named him “Artist of the Year.” His orchestral work “Gift” opened the Shanghai Symphony's 140th season and received its US premiere by the New York Philharmonic in 2020. In 2022, he received the Sousa-ABA-Ostwald Award from the American Bandmasters Association for Sinfonia, becoming the first Asian-American winner in the award's 66-year history.

A graduate of the Curtis Institute of Music, Zhou Tian earned his Masters of Music degree from the Juilliard School and a Doctor of Musical Arts from the University of Southern California. He is Professor of Composition at Michigan State University.

== Compositions ==
=== Symphonic works and concertos ===
- Double Concerto (for violin, viola and orchestra) (2024)
- Threads (2024)
- Birthday Fantasia (2024)
- Violin Concerto "Night Tour" (2022)
- Flute Concerto (2022)
- Metropolis (2022)
- Gift (2019)
- Transcend (2019)
- Cello Concerto "Flowing Sleeves" (2018)
- Rise (2018)
- Concerto for Orchestra (2016)
- Viaje (flute & strings) (2016)
- Joy (strings) (2016)
- Broken Ink (2013)
- Listening to the Land (2013)
- Trace (2013)
- A Thousand Years of Good Prayers (2009)
- The Grand Canal (erhu, ruan, Chinese opera singer, mixed chorus, and orchestra) (2008)
- First Sight (2007)
- The Palace of Nine Perfections (2004)
- Nocturne (for strings) (2003)

=== Symphonic band ===
- Concerto for Alto Saxophone (2026)
- Vivo (2025)
- Sinfonia (2022)
- Nocturne (2021)
- Trace (2021)
- Seeker's Scherzo (2019)
- Petals of Fire (2017)

=== Chamber music (2-6 musicians) ===
- Three Chinese Songs (soprano saxophone & piano) (2025)
- Irises (flute & piano) (2023)
- Cadence (cello quartet - 4 cellos) (2023)
- Hidden Grace (flute, viola & harp) (2023)
- Night Tour (violin & piano) (2022)
- Flowing Sleeves (cello & piano quintet) (2021)
- Nocturne (saxophone quartet) (2021)
- Joy (string quintet) (2019)
- Hundred Antiques (erhu, pipa, violin, cello & percussion) (2018)
- Viaje (soprano saxophone, tenor saxophone & piano) (2017)
- Viaje (flute & string quartet or flute, cello & piano) (2015)
- Morning after the Deluge (violin, piano & string quartet / clarinet, piano & string quartet) (2014)
- Night-Shining White (brass quintet) (2014)
- Red Trees, Wrinkled Cliffs (guitar, violin, viola & cello) (2012)
- String Quartet No. 2 (2010)
- Unheard Wishes (clarinet & piano) (2009)
- A Crown for Sonia (soprano, cello & piano) (2008)
- Reading an Anthology of Chinese Poems...(narrator, flute, viola & harp) (2008)
- Duo (violin & viola) (2006)
- Ye (two cellos & piano) (2005)
- Morning Call (brass quintet) (2002)
- Piano Trio (2002)
- Three Chinese Songs (voice & piano) (2002)
- String Quartet No. 1 (2000)
- Duet (flute & piano) (1999)

=== Solo instrument ===
- Prelude (piano) (2023)
- Majestic Bells (piano) (2022)
- Crystal (piano) (2018)
- Blowing Westward (marimba) (2008)
- Rhyme (cello) (2005)
- Prism (piano) (2004)

=== Voice and chorus ===
- Trade Winds (a cappella) (2019)
- Broken Ink (orchestra with mixed chorus) (2013)
- A Crown for Sonia (soprano, cello & piano) (2008)
- Reading an Anthology of Chinese Poems...(narrator, flute, viola & harp) (2008)
- The Grand Canal (erhu, ruan, Chinese opera singer, mixed chorus, and orchestra) (2008)
- Iris and Butterfly (chorus & string quartet / chorus & piano ) (2002)
- Three Chinese Songs (voice & piano) (2002)
