= Zoie Reams =

American mezzo-soprano

- Born: Chicago
- Genre: opera
- Occupations: opera singer, actor
- Years active: 2016-present

Zoie Reams is an American mezzo-soprano opera singer. Until 2025, she mainly sang at the Houston Grand Opera, at the Minnesota Opera and at the Lyric Opera of Chicago. In 2021, she debuted at the Met.

== Career ==
Zoie Reams studied at Lawrence University and Louisiana State University. She was then invited to the Butler Studio of the Houston Grand Opera. Her first roles included an angel in Heggie's It's a Wonderful Life, Flora Bervoix in Verdi's La traviata and Mao's third secretary in Adam's Nixon in China. At the Wolf Trap Opera she has been seen and heard in rarely performed works by Gioachino Rossini and John Musto.

In the 2021/22 season she was a member of the Minnesota Opera ensemble. There she sang the title role in Bizet's Carmen and Nancy in Britten's Albert Herring, among others. She also appeared as Carmen at the Opera Louisiane, as Maddalena in Verdi's Rigoletto at the Theater Basel and as Suzuki in Puccini's Madama Butterfly at the Opera Columbus. Since 2019, she has been a regular at the Lyric Opera of Chicago, the most important opera house in her home city, where she has performed roles including Flora Bervoix and Maddalena as well as Ragonde in Rossini's Le comte Ory. In 2021, she debuted at the Metropolitan Opera in New York as Lily in Gershwin's Porgy and Bess. In 2022, she appeared at the Cincinnati Opera as Jane in the world premiere of Castor and Patience, an opera by Tracy K. Smith and Gregory Spears.

She made her debut at the Austin Opera in January 2023 as Beggar Woman in Sondheim's Sweeney Todd. In the 2023/24 season she returned to the Minnesota Opera — as Dinah in Bernstein's Trouble in Tahiti and as Autumn in Service Provider by Christopher Weiss and John de los Santos. In the summer of 2024 she appeared as Erika in Barber's Vanessa at the Spoleto Festival USA and as Suspicious Old Woman in Prokofiev's The Gambler at the Salzburg Festival. This was followed — as a premiere at the Lyric Opera in Chicago and as a role debut — by the role of the mother in Blue, an opera by Tazewell Thompson and Jeanine Tesori about racism and police violence in the USA.

Zoie Reams can also be heard regularly in concert halls. For example, she sang the alto solos in Beethoven's Ninth (with the National Symphony Orchestra), Bruckner's Te Deum (with the Houston Symphony), Michael Tippett's A Child of Our Time (with the New York Choral Society) at New York's Carnegie Hall, Bernstein's Jeremiah Symphony (with the Philharmonic Orchestra of the State Theater Cottbus) and Handel's Messiah in Las Vegas, Kansas City and at the Washington National Cathedral.

== Competitions ==
- 2015 First prize at the Classical Singer Vocal Competition
- 2016 Second prize at the Eleanor McCollum Competition of the Houston Grand Opera
- 2016 Second prizes at the Metropolitan Opera National Council Auditions (Gulf Coast Region)
