= Jennifer Johnson Cano =

American operatic mezzo-soprano

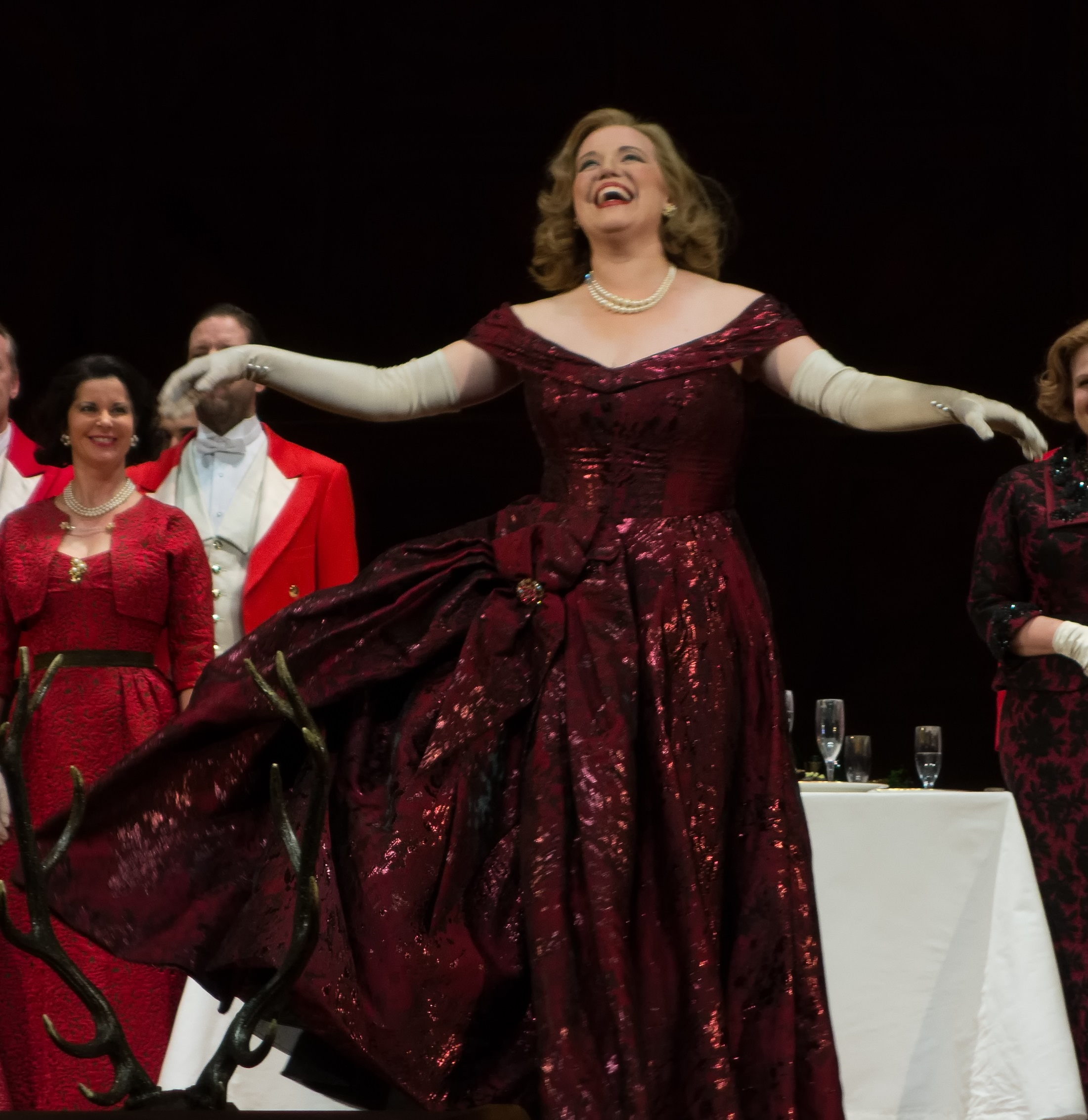
Jennifer Johnson Cano at the Metropolitan Opera House in 2013

Jennifer Johnson Cano is an American operatic mezzo-soprano. A native of St. Louis, Missouri, she was educated as a musician at Webster University and Rice University. She was an apprentice artist at the Opera Theatre of Saint Louis prior to making her professional debut there in 2008 as the Muse/Nicklausse in Jacques Offenbach's The Tales of Hoffmann. That same year she won the Metropolitan Opera National Council Auditions which earned her a place in the Lindemann Young Artist Development Program. She has sung leading roles at the Met since 2009, and most recently appeared there in 2026 as Suzuki in Giacomo Puccini's Madama Butterfly. She created roles in the world premieres of two operas by Gregory Spears, and also sang the role of Virginia Woolf in the world premiere of Kevin Puts's opera The Hours in Philadelphia prior to its production at the Met.

Also active on the concert stage and as a recitalist, Johnson Cano has performed as a soloist with the New York Philharmonic, the London Symphony Orchestra, the Los Angeles Philharmonic, the Cleveland Orchestra, and the Philadelphia Orchestra among other ensembles. She frequently performs in concerts with her husband, the pianist Christopher Cano.

== Early life and education ==
The daughter of Robert and Andrea Johnson, Jennifer Johnson was born in St. Louis, Missouri in c. 1985. She grew up in Festus, Missouri where she attended St. Pius X High School. While a student there she participated in Missouri's All-State Choir in the Spring of 2002; graduating from St. Pius later that year. She pursued undergraduate studies at Webster University where she earned a Bachelor of Music degree in 2006. She undertook graduate studies in music at Rice University where she studied singing with Kathleen Kaun. She graduated from Rice with a Master of Music degree in 2008. While a student at Rice she performed in several operas stage by the Shepherd School of Music; starring as Cavalier Ramiro in Wolfgang Amadeus Mozart's La finta giardiniera, Emma Jones in Kurt Weill's Street Scene, and the title role in George Frideric Handel's Rinaldo.

From 2006-2008 Johnson was an apprentice artist at the Opera Theatre of Saint Louis (OTSL). While at OTSL in her formative years she met the pianist Christopher Cano and began a close friendship with him in her final summer in OTSL's apprentice program. They subsequently reconnected after Jennifer moved to New York City, where Cano lived, and eventually married. She relocated to New York City after winning the Metropolitan Opera National Council Auditions in 2008. She became a member of the Metropolitan Opera's Lindemann Young Artist Development Program where she trained as an apprentice opera singer from the fall of 2008 through the Spring of 2011.

In 2009 Johnson won first prize in the Young Concert Artists competition, and was the recipient of a Richard Tucker Career Grant in 2012. In 2013 she participated in public masterclasses given by Marilyn Horne with Horne working with her in front of an audience. In 2014 she won a George London Foundation Award.

== Career ==
=== 2008-2012 ===
Johnson Cano made her professional opera debut with the OTSL in 2008 as the Muse/Nicklausse in Jacques Offenbach's The Tales of Hoffmann. In 2009 she was a soloist at the Marlboro Music Festival where she performed Robert Cuckson's Der gayst funem shturem. That same year she made her debuts at the Chicago Opera Theater as Kate Julian in Benjamin Britten's Owen Wingrave, and at the Metropolitan Opera ("Met") as one of the Bridesmaids in Mozart's The Marriage of Figaro. Her first leading role at the Met was soon after as the Sandman in Engelbert Humperdinck's Hänsel und Gretel in 2009; a role which she has repeated with the company in the 2011-2012 season.

Other early performances for Johnson Cano at the Met included Wellgunde in both Das Rheingold (2010) and Götterdämmerung (2012-2013); Kate Pinkerton in Madama Butterfly (2011); and Ludmila in The Bartered Bride (2011). The latter part was performed at the Juilliard School in a collaboration between the Met's Lindemann Young Artist Development Program and the Ellen and James S. Marcus Institute for Vocal Arts at Juilliard. In May 2011 she made her New York recital debut at Merkin Concert Hall. The New York Times music critic Zachary Woolfe wrote the following in his review:

"Ms. Johnson Cano is effortlessly likable, but in both her voice and her manner there is also a hint of something steely, even intimidating. She has the qualities Joan Didion ascribed to people with self-respect: “a certain toughness, a kind of moral nerve; they display what was once called character.” Character — individuality, a taste for risk — is the attribute some find lacking in young American singers, but Ms. Johnson Cano has it: an honesty and assurance so impressive that you want to call it bravery."

The summer of 2011 Johnson Cano gave a recital as part of the Central Park Summer Stage concert series as a representative of the Met; returned to the Marlboro Music Festival to perform during its 60th Anniversary season; and was a soloist in Ludwig van Beethoven's Symphony No. 9 with the Los Angeles Philharmonic (LAP) and conductor Rafael Frühbeck de Burgos at the Hollywood Bowl. She repeated Beethoven's Ninth with the San Francisco Symphony (SFS) and conductor Michael Tilson Thomas in 2012, and also was a soloist that year with both the SFS and the Ann Arbor Symphony in separate performances of George Frideric Handel's Messiah. In September 2011 she performed Gustav Mahler's Das Lied von der Erde with the Orchestra of St. Luke's; a work she repeated with the New York Philharmonic (NYP) in 2013.

In the summer of 2012 Johnson Cano was a soloist in Mozart's Great Mass in C minor, K. 427 with the NYP and conductor Alan Gilbert at Avery Fisher Hall; a work she sang again with the Canticum Novum in 2013. In October 2012 she was a soloist with the Musica Sacra Chorus and Orchestra in Joseph Haydn's Nelson Mass. In November 2012 she gave a recital with her husband at the Isabella Stewart Gardner Museum featuring music by Herbert Howells, Antonín Dvořák, and Franz Liszt; having teamed with her husband earlier that year for a concert at Kleinhans Music Hall with the Buffalo Chamber Music Society.

=== 2013-2019 ===
In the 2013-2014 season Johnson Cano returned to the Met as Meg in Giuseppe Verdi's Falstaff with Ambrogio Maestri in the title role; later singing that part again with Maestri at the Met in 2019. She was also heard at the Met that season as Bersi in Andrea Chénier. In 2014 she portrayed the Fox in The Cunning Little Vixen in a semi-staged production of the opera with the Cleveland Orchestra; sang the part of Marguerite in Hector Berlioz's La Damnation de Faust with the Tucson Symphony Orchestra, and performed the role in Mercédès in Georges Bizet's Carmen at the Met in a performance that was recorded for the Metropolitan Opera radio broadcasts.

In 2015 she returned to the Met as Emilia in Verdi's Otello with Aleksandrs Antonenko in the title part, and portrayed Donna Elvira in Don Giovanni at the Boston Lyric Opera. In March 2016 she appeared in recital with her husband at the Morgan Library & Museum. The following December she was a soloist in John Adams's El Niño at the Barbican Centre with the London Symphony Orchestra; a work she had sung earlier that year with the LAP led by conductor Grant Gershon.

In 2017 she was a soloist once again in Handel's Messiah with the NYP led by conductor Andrew Manze, and was also heard with the NYP that year in a concert version of Das Rheingold. That same year she returned to the Met as the Priestess in Aida with Krassimira Stoyanova in the title role. In 2018 she portrayed Orfeo in Christoph Willibald Gluck's Orfeo ed Euridice in a return to the OTSL, and sang Emilia to Russell Thomas's Otello with the LAP led by Gustavo Dudamel at the Hollywood Bowl. That same year she sang with the LAP in Beethoven's Symphony No. 9 and was a guest artist in Anna Netrebko's concert at Carnegie Hall; performing two duets with the famous soprano. In 2019 she portrayed Offred in Poul Ruders's The Handmaid's Tale with the Boston Lyric Opera.

=== 2020-2026 ===
In January 2020 Johnson Cano performed Leoš Janáček's The Diary of One Who Disappeared at the 92nd Street Y; a work she had performed a year earlier with tenor Matthew Polenzani in his recital at Zankel Hall. With the outbreak of the Covid-19 pandemic many of her performance engagements were cancelled in the early 2020s.

Johnson Cano created roles in the world premieres of two operas composed by Gregory Spears: Celeste in Castor and Patience at the Cincinnati Opera in 2022 and Michele in The Righteous at the Santa Fe Opera in 2024. In March 2022 she sang the part of Virginia Woolf in the world premiere of Kevin Puts's opera The Hours which was given in a concert version with the Philadelphia Orchestra and fellow lead singers Kelli O’Hara and Renée Fleming. This role was later taken over by Joyce DiDonato when it was staged at the Met. In May 2022 Jennifer sang Emilia in a semi-staged production of Otello with the Cleveland Orchestra. In 2023 she returned to the Met as Verdi's Meg with Michael Volle as Falstaff, and portrayed Donna Elvira in Don Giovanni at the Atlanta Opera. In 2024 she gave a recital with her husband at Portland State University.

In 2025 Johnson Cano returned to the Santa Fe Opera as Mrs. Grose in Benjamin Britten's The Turn of the Screw and Schwertleite in Die Walküre. That same year she performed as a soloist in Haydn's Mass in Time of War with the Chicago Symphony Orchestra (CSO) and conductor Manfred Honeck; performed with the CSO again in Giovanni Battista Pergolesi's Stabat Mater under Daniela Candillari; returned to the OTSL as Hermia in Britten's A Midsummer Night's Dream; and performed the role of Amneris in Aida at the Arizona Opera in the first staged opera to incorporate AI into a live opera performance. In 2026 she returned to the Met as Suzuki in Giacomo Puccini's Madama Butterfly.
