= Lawrence University Conservatory of Music =

- Appleton, Wisconsin; United States

Information
- Type: Private
- Established: 1874
- Dean: Christopher Jenkins
- Faculty: 65
- Enrollment: 350
- Affiliations: Lawrence University
- Practice Rooms: 40
- Concert Halls/Recital Halls/Main Stages: 4
- Website: www.lawrence.edu/conservatory

The Lawrence University Conservatory of Music, a constituent member of Lawrence University in Appleton, Wisconsin, offers undergraduate degrees in music, music performance, education, theory, and composition. Founded in 1874, (Note: Some historians, including Stephen Ellis Busch, date the founding to 1894, when the music program became an independent department and the first Director since 1876 was named.) it is one of the oldest operating conservatories in the United States. The conservatory is known for a five-year dual degree program which allows students to graduate with both a music degree and a degree in another academic discipline. Through the Performing Arts Series, the Lawrence Community Music School and other programs, the conservatory extends access to music to the surrounding community.

== History ==
Music instruction has been offered at Lawrence since the university was founded. In 1849, the first year classes were held, (Note: These were preparatory classes; collegiate-level instruction did not begin until 1853.) Emeline M. Crooker, the preceptress, gave lessons on her own piano. She also taught drawing and painting, which were listed in the first catalog, along with music, as "ornamental branches" of study. When Crooker left in 1853, taking her piano with her, the school's trustees decided to hire a new piano teacher and purchase a new piano, which was a major investment for the fledgling school. This was the beginning of the music preparatory program.

When Main Hall, which housed almost all school functions, was completed, Francena Medora Kellogg Buck, class of 1857, remembered:

The first public exercise held in the then "new building" [...] was at the close of the June term in 1854. How it rained! The piano had to be taken from the old building to the new and professional piano movers had not then been invented. The deed was accomplished with no perceptible injury to the instrument, on which I played "Spirit Waltz."

Recalling the post-Civil War era, J. S. Anderson, class of 1870, wrote:

The musical department of the college was decidedly primitive. In 1865 it consisted of a single piano of ancient vintage in the ladies building, on which the professor or "professorin" gave lessons of a very primary character to pupils who practiced where and when they could. [...] There were some instrumentalists in our number and an impromptu orchestra was formed. It appeared at the public functions of the college on several occasions and was much appreciated. People were not quite so critical in those days. [...] The period was marked not only by reconstruction but by progress. [...] The musical department was built up and extended.

By 1870 there were twenty-four full-course music students. At the instigation of President George McKendree Steele, a collegiate-level music program was instituted in 1874 and a director named, marking the founding of the conservatory as it exists today. By 1877, however, the conservatory had lost its independence; the diploma in music was discontinued and the department was placed under the president's control.

The music program made do with one or two instructors until 1894, when President Samuel G. Plantz re-established the conservatory as an independent department, re-instated the position of director and increased the faculty to five; one of the new hires was responsible for teaching banjo and mandolin. A one-year course of teacher training in public school methods was added in 1901. By 1902 enrollment had risen to 170. Piano tuning was added to the curriculum in 1916.

In the early years of the twentieth century, musical groups on campus included the Choral Union, Chapel Choir, Boys' Glee Club and Girls' Glee Club, the College Band and the College Orchestra, and the Men's and Women's Quartettes.

Many groups traveled to perform around the state and further afield. As early as 1886, the glee club was touring towns in northern and western Wisconsin. In 1915 Professor Carl Waterman and three students, known as the Lyric Quartette, along with a fourth student as manager, made a three-month automobile tour to California, giving concerts along the way and performing at the Panama-Pacific International Exposition in San Francisco. (Note: Tour manager George Reynolds estimated that they gave sixty to seventy concerts en route. He wrote: "The quartette sang last night to about 3,000 people in the big Chautauqua auditorium at Boulder, and the audience seemed to be able to stand the strain with ease. In fact they acted as if they liked it. The Chautauqua is one of the largest in the west and as many have told us that they liked the concert better than anything ever given in the auditorium, we must have got away with the goods. But, then—some people may have warped judgments.") Touring not only gave students performance experience but generated good publicity for the school. During the 1907-1908 academic year, the entire conservatory faculty gave out-of-town concerts as a means of promoting the conservatory and the college.

By the 1940s, the conservatory was an important part of the university, but there was occasional ambivalence about its mission. In 1947 the Post-Crescent reported:

Shortly before 1930 the funds for a new conservatory of music were made available by a private foundation, but were lost during the stock market crash. [...] President Pusey has stated that the art building and the remodeling of science hall are the "most urgent current" needs, and must precede any conservatory building. [...] President Pusey has also said that the college will not attempt to increase the enrollment of full time conservatory students any further. Rather, he explained, any musical expansion will be in the direction of encouraging the role of music in the liberal arts program as a leisure pursuit and as an accredited course to be applied toward the bachelor of arts degree.

For much of its existence, and particularly since its re-establishment in 1894, the conservatory had been mostly independent of the university. It had its own budget, hired its faculty, recruited and registered its students and housed them in conservatory dormitories. Because these administrative functions had been gradually absorbed by the university, the office of Dean of the Conservatory was abolished in 1949. LaVahn Maesch, professor of organ and music literature, was appointed head of the Committee on Academic Policy, overseeing the only remaining administrative responsibility—setting the conservatory curriculum. Maesch was named director in 1954 and became dean when the office was restored in 1965.

== Campus ==
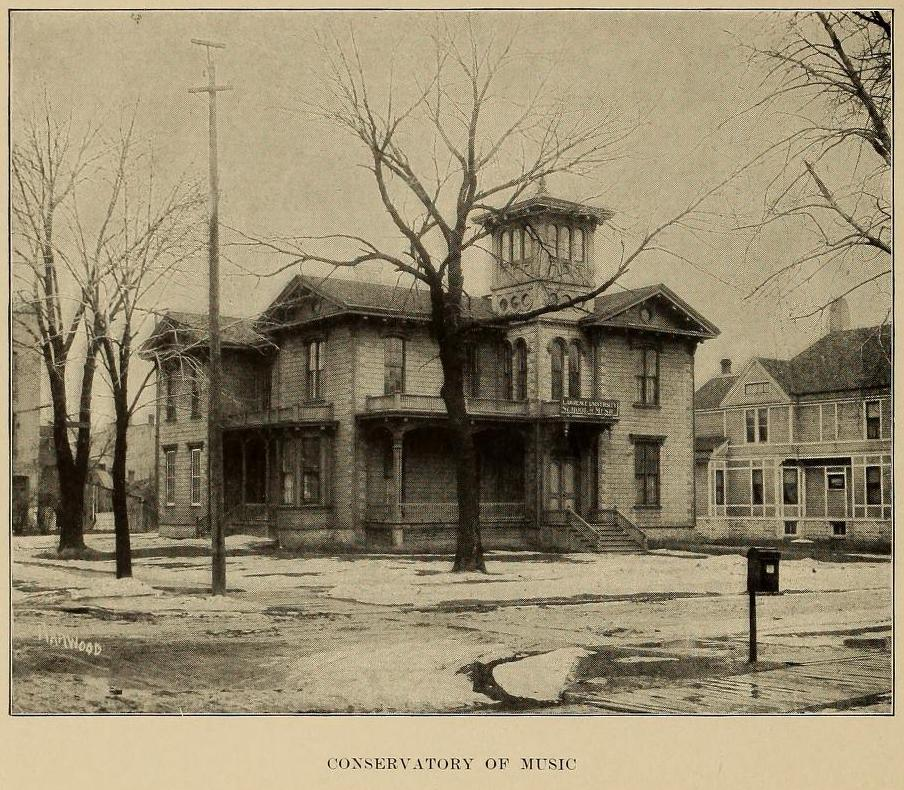
Conservatory of Music, 1910

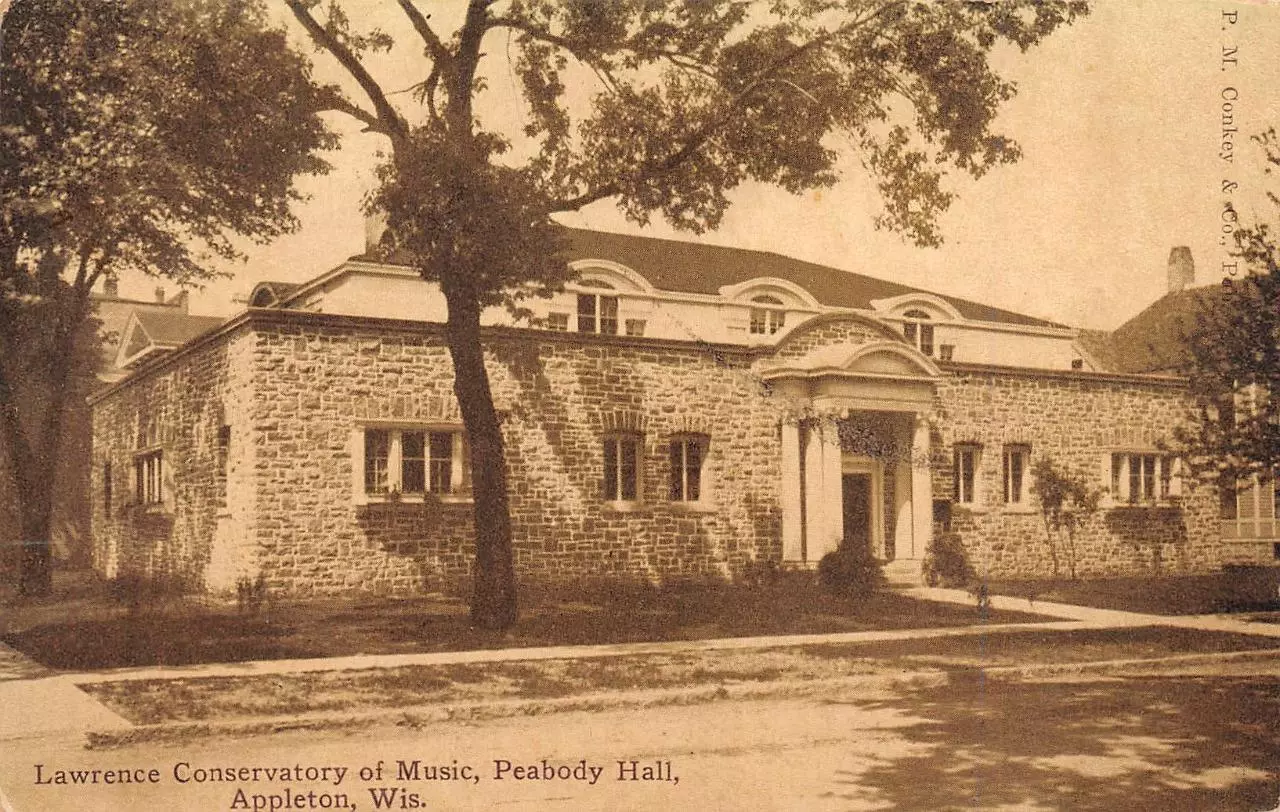
Peabody Hall, 1911

After Main Hall opened in 1853, music lessons, along with all other classes, were held there. There were complaints about the noise of the piano. The first building dedicated to conservatory use was a wood-frame house purchased in 1906 for $8000. After remodeling, the building contained studios, offices, and practice rooms. Later it became, along with a second house, an annex to the new Peabody Hall, named for donor George F. Peabody, (Note: George Frederick Peabody (1835–1909), one of the most prominent men in Appleton, owned the Pettibone-Peabody dry goods business. He donated $12,000 for the construction of a new conservatory building. His daughter Emma married William E. Harper, the dean of the conservatory. Peabody disliked Harper and made sure he would not benefit from his will. When the initial donation proved insufficient, Emma increased it to $18,000.) built in 1909 on E. Lawrence Street. Along with classrooms, practice rooms and an office for the dean, the building included a 400-seat recital hall.

Memorial Chapel, dedicated in 1919, is the largest performance space on campus. It houses a 49-rank mechanical-action organ built in 1995 by John Brombaugh of Eugene, Oregon, one of four organs owned by the school.

A new Music-Drama Center opened in 1959, providing classrooms, practice rooms, a library and two performance spaces, the 445-seat Stansbury Theater and Harper Hall, seating 249. Peabody Hall and its annexes were demolished.

A major expansion of the physical plant was completed in 1991. As described in the Post-Crescent:

The Ruth Harwood Shattuck Hall of Music connects the Music-Drama Center and Memorial Chapel to create a comprehensive music facility. The newest addition provides faculty studios, practice rooms, classrooms, percussion studios, a jazz rehearsal room, two large-ensemble rooms, a digital recording/editing studio, and student lounge and study areas.

In September 2025, the university opened a new building, West Campus, which includes a music production studio, a performance space, and 18 soundproof offices intended for use by faculty who give private music instruction.

== Academics ==
The conservatory offers four degree programs: Bachelor of Arts, Bachelor of Music, a combined BA/BMus (a five-year program granting two degrees), and Bachelor of Musical Arts. The BMA program, added in 2019, combines music and liberal arts studies, with a concentration on jazz and improvisational music. Many students matriculate at Lawrence specifically because they want to pursue both music and a non-musical discipline; over fifty percent of incoming conservatory students are in the dual-degree program.

Majors are offered in composition, music, music education, music performance, and music theory. In 2023, a minor in dance was added. Other conservatory programs include jazz and improvisational music, musicology, and opera theater. Instruction is available for string instruments, guitar, harp, wind and brass instruments, percussion, piano, organ and voice.

Although the conservatory does not offer a major in jazz, it does offer a BM in Performance or Composition with a Jazz Emphasis. The Lawrence Jazz Department has won over 25 DownBeat awards since 1985, including Best Large Jazz Ensemble in the undergraduate category.

The conservatory offers opportunities to participate in a variety of ensembles, which are open to all students, whether they are majoring in music or not. There are two bands, two orchestras, four choirs, and three jazz groups. In addition, there are a number of specialized groups, including the Balinese Gamelan, Improvisation Group (IGLU), Mariachi Ensemble (LUMÉ), New Music Ensemble, Opera Theatre, and the Percussion Ensemble (LUPÉ).

== Community engagement ==
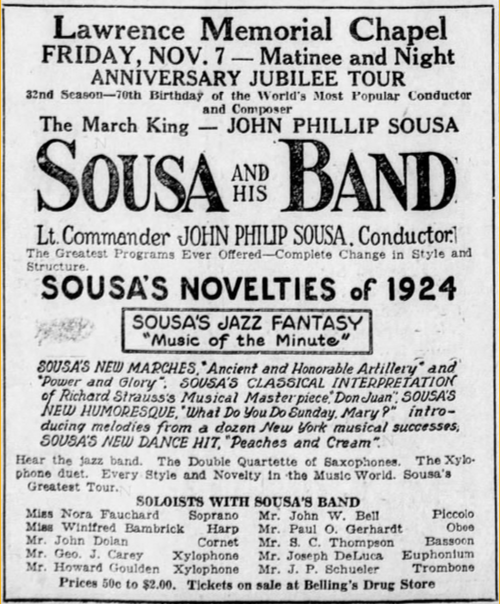
John Philip Sousa concert Nov 07 1924, ad in The Post-Crescent, Appleton WI

The conservatory presents approximately forty ensemble performances per year, along with many recitals by students and faculty. All events are open to the public, most free of charge.

In 1908, a performing arts series, which brings national and international artists to campus, was organized by Dean William Harper. The inaugural concert featured David Bispham, a well-known operatic baritone. The series went on to book, among many others, Pablo Casals, Marian Anderson, the Trapp Family Singers, Joshua Bell, and Yo-Yo Ma. In recent years, performers have included the Imani Winds, Jazz at Lincoln Center Orchestra with Wynton Marsalis and Roomful of Teeth. The Jazz Series was added to the Performing Arts Series in 1992.

The Lawrence Community Music School (LCMS), the current incarnation of the preparatory program which began in 1874, offers educational opportunities and performance experiences for the surrounding community.

LCMS, which serves approximately 900 students of all ages, presents more than forty concerts every year. In addition to individual and ensemble instruction, classes are offered in music theory, chamber music, and early childhood education.

== Leadership ==
Directors

- 1874–1876 T. Martin Towne
- 1877–1893 [No director]
- 1894–1906 John Silvester (Professor of vocal and instrumental music 1885–1906, named director in 1894)
- 1906–1907 T. Dillwyn Thomas
- 1907–1908 Dudley L. Smith

Deans

- 1908–1913 William E. Harper (voice faculty 1907, appointed director in 1908, Dean in 1909)
- 1913–1920 Frederick Vance Evans (Professor of voice)
- 1920–1949 Carl J. "Judge" Waterman (Diploma of Music 1905, faculty member 1910–1953)
- 1950 - Office of Dean abolished by President Pusey.
- 1954–1970 LaVahn K. Maesch (Class of 1926, faculty member 1926–1970, Professor of organ, appointed director in 1954, became dean in 1965)
- 1970–1971 Ralph Lane, with associate deans James Ming and Clyde Duncan
- 1972–1978 Charles F. Schwartz
- 1979–1988 Colin Murdoch
- 1988–1989 Nancy Marsh Stowe (Class of 1961, voice faculty, acting Dean of the Conservatory)
- 1989–1999 Richard K. Dodson
- 1999–2004 Kathleen Murray (piano faculty, Dean of the Faculty and Conservatory)
- 2005–2008 Robert Thayer
- 2008–2025 Brian Pertl (Class of 1986)
- 2025–present Christopher Jenkins

== Noted alumni ==
- Derrell Acon, bass-baritone, producer, activist, co-founder Black Opera Alliance
- Duffie Adelson, former president of the Merit School of Music
- Javier Arau, musician, composer, founder New York Jazz Academy
- Virginia Danielson, music librarian, ethnomusicologist
- Rick Davis, director and Dean of the College of Visual and Performing Arts, George Mason University
- Dale Duesing, operatic baritone
- Stephen Edwards, film and TV composer
- Shirlee Emmons, operatic soprano
- Julia Gaines, percussionist
- James Gandre, president of the Manhattan School of Music
- Hannah Jeané Jones, operatic soprano (Metropolitan Opera young artist program)
- Peter Kolkay, bassoonist
- Fred Lerdahl, composer
- Robert McDonald, pianist, piano and chamber music faculty, Juilliard
- Sarah Morris, singer-songwriter
- Garth Neustadter, composer
- Zoie Reams, operatic mezzo soprano
- William Sharp, baritone, professor of voice, Peabody Institute
- Kim D. Sherman, composer
- Anne Simonett, pianist, Chief Judge of the Minnesota Court of Appeals
- Heidi Stober, operatic soprano
- Fred Sturm, composer

== Sources ==
Books and theses

- Busch, Stephen Ellis (1960). A History of the Lawrence Conservatory of Music (Doctor of Education thesis). University of Michigan. doi:10.7302/15848.
- Lawrence College Alumni Record 1857–1915. Appleton, Wisconsin: Post Publishing. 1916.
- Peot, Rachel; Mead, Anne Atwood, eds. (September 1988). Time & Traditions. Appleton, Wisconsin: Lawrence University Office of Public Affairs.
- Uscher, Nancy (1988). The Schirmer Guide to Schools of Music and Conservatories Throughout the World. Schirmer Books. ISBN 0-02-873030-5.

Newspapers

- "Is Helping to Make a Musical Center". Appleton Evening Crescent. Appleton, Wisconsin. December 5, 1908.
- "G. F. Peabody Died Sunday". Appleton Evening Crescent. Appleton, Wisconsin. September 13, 1909a.
- "Peabody Hall Will Be Fine Structure". Appleton Evening Crescent. Appleton, Wisconsin. November 13, 1909b.
- "Artistic Appleton". The Post-Crescent. Appleton, Wisconsin. February 25, 1928.
- "Music Included in 1st Courses at Lawrence". The Post-Crescent. Appleton, Wisconsin. June 6, 1947a.
- "Lawrence Long Has Needed New Music Building". The Post-Crescent. Appleton, Wisconsin. June 6, 1947b.
- "Trustees Vote Changes at Music Conservatory". The Post-Crescent. Appleton, Wisconsin. June 11, 1949.
- "Classes for beginners". The Post-Crescent. Appleton, Wisconsin. November 10, 1974b.
- Lowe, Bob (September 25, 1991). "Lawrence addition ready to go". The Post-Crescent. Appleton, Wisconsin. pp. 9–10.
- "Philanthropist supplied numerous gifts". The Post-Crescent. Appleton, Wisconsin. September 2, 1995. p. 1.
- Wideman, Steve (June 21, 1997). "LU Chapel a community landmark". The Post-Crescent. Appleton, Wisconsin. p. 62.
