= Life on Mars (poetry collection) =

Poetry collection by Tracy K. Smith

- First edition
- Author: Tracy K. Smith
- Language: English
- Publisher: Graywolf Press
- Publication date: May 10, 2011
- Publication place: United States
- Pages: 88 pp.
- Awards: 2012 Pulitzer Prize for Poetry
- ISBN: 978-1-55597-584-5
- Website: Life on Mars at Graywolf Press

Life on Mars is a poetry collection by Tracy K. Smith for which she won the 2012 Pulitzer Prize for Poetry. The collection is an elegy for her father, a scientist who worked on the Hubble Space Telescope.

== Publication ==
Smith published the 88-page collection with Graywolf Press in 2011.

== Content ==
Writing in The Washington Post, Troy Jollimore advised readers "had better be prepared to face some stark metaphysical questions...An awareness of death permeates Life on Mars." In The New Yorker, Dan Chiasson described Life on Mars as "Smith's wild, far-ranging elegy" for her father who died in 2008. Her father had been a scientist who worked on the Hubble Space Telescope and "Smith cannot think about [him] without thinking in galactic dimensions, which, paradoxically, minimize him: drawn to that scale, individual lives (even his) can seem puny, and private traumas (even hers) inconsequential."

Chiasson also points to the Martian reference's callback to the culture of the 1950s. "The issues of power and paternalism suggest the deep ways in which this is a book about race. Smith's deadpan title is itself racially freighted: we can't think about one set of fifties images of Martians and sci-fi comics, without conjuring another, of black kids in the segregated South."

== Reception ==
Reviewing the collection for The New York Times, Joel Brouwer said Life on Mars shows Smith "to be a poet of extraordinary range and ambition...and the early successes of this collection far outweigh its later missteps. As all the best poetry does, Life on Mars first sends us out into the magnificent chill of the imagination and then returns us to ourselves, both changed and consoled." Jollimore praised the poem "My God, It's Full of Stars" as "particularly strong, making use of images from science and science fiction to articulate human desire and grief."

Life on Mars was named to The New York Times list of "100 Notable Books of 2011".

== Awards ==
- 2012 Pulitzer Prize in Poetry, with the citation reading: "A collection of bold, skillful poems, taking readers into the universe and moving them to an authentic mix of joy and pain."
