= Stecher and Horowitz =

Melvin Stecher and Norman Horowitz, known as Stecher and Horowitz, are an American piano duo.

Stecher and Horowitz became a professional duo in 1951, while still students, continuing to perform together for the next five decades. Managed by National Concert and Artists Corporation/Civic Music and later by Columbia Artists Management/Community Concerts, they performed recitals throughout the United States, Canada, Central and South America (under State Department sponsorship), Europe, Israel, Japan and Australia. They were the first duo-piano attraction to be engaged at Radio City Music Hall, where they played 84 performances. They also played 300 concerts as guest artists with the Roger Wagner Chorale from 1955 to 1959.

The American composer Walter Piston dedicated his Concerto for Two Pianos and Orchestra to the duo-pianists, who premiered the work in 1964.

They founded and served as co-directors of The Stecher and Horowitz School of the Arts in Cedarhurst, New York for 39 years (1960–1999). Additionally, they served as educational consultants to G. Schirmer Inc., for whom they wrote and edited the Stecher and Horowitz Piano Library, developing from beginning piano material to a college text, Keyboard Strategies.

In 2002, Stecher and Horowitz created The New York International Piano Competition (NYIPC), a biennial, no-elimination competition open to pianists of all nationalities ages 16–21. They currently serve as Executive Directors of the Stecher and Horowitz Foundation in New York City, a non-profit foundation that serves young musicians worldwide, established in 1975.

Stecher and Horowitz are profiled in three documentary film directed by Lucy Bruell detailing their performing and teaching careers, as well as the motivations and aspirations of competitors in three New York International Piano Competitions; Speaking with Music; Beyond the Practice Room; and On a Personal Note.

They were awarded the Citation of Leadership by the MTNA in 2012. The following year, the MTNA Foundation established an endowment fund to honor their contributions to American piano pedagogy.

The duo released an autobiography, STECHER & HOROWITZ DUO-PIANISTS, chronicling the “Unequaled Journey” of a remarkable duo. STECHER & HOROWITZ KEYBOARD LEGENDS, is a newly released CD of the duo-pianists, originally recorded in 1966 at the historic Webster Hall, New York City.
