= Andrew Feinberg =

American journalist

Andrew Grant Feinberg
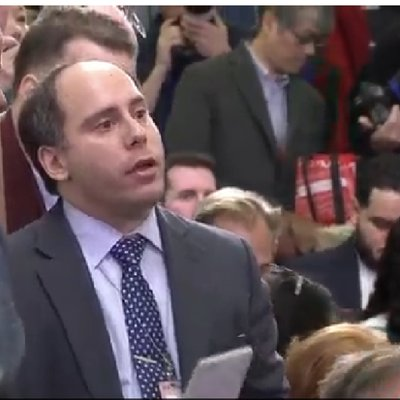
- Andrew Feinberg at a February, 2017 White House Press Briefing
- Born: July 22, 1982 (age 44); Washington, D.C., U.S.
- Education: BA, University of Wisconsin–Madison
- Employer: The Independent

Andrew Feinberg is an American journalist and White House Correspondent whose work has appeared in The Independent, Newsweek, Politico, Washington Business Journal, and other news outlets.

== Early life ==
Feinberg was born to a Jewish family in Washington, DC and grew up in Bethesda, Maryland where he attended Walt Whitman High School and graduated in 2001 along with journalist Ashley Parker. Feinberg attended the University of Wisconsin–Madison and graduated in 2005 with a Bachelor of Arts degree in History and History of Science. He was a coxswain on the university's rowing team and participated in the 2002 selection process for the United States' Under-23 National Rowing Team, but was cut along with future 2008 Olympic Medalist Marcus McElhenney.

== Career ==
Feinberg began his career at Warren Communications News where he covered telecommunications and Internet policy for Communications Daily and Washington Internet Daily. He was the first reporter to break the story of House Democrats' 2008 attempt to restrict and regulate the use of social media by Members of Congress.

In 2012, Feinberg joined The Hill as a staff writer covering technology and telecommunications policy. Over the years his work has appeared in publications including Washington Business Journal, Politico Magazine, Silicon Angle, and Mashable.

=== Sputnik News ===
Seeking a full-time reporting position, Feinberg interviewed with Sputnik News editor Peter Martinichev in December 2016 and was hired as Sputnik's first full-time White House Correspondent, joining the D.C. bureau at the beginning of the Trump administration. While working for Sputnik Feinberg covered daily press briefings and other events at the White House while working out of the James S. Brady Press Briefing Room. In March 2017, he became the first Sputnik reporter to apply for permanent White House press credentials.

On May 26, 2017, Feinberg announced on Twitter that he was no longer working for Sputnik. In an interview with Erik Wemple of The Washington Post, he explained that Sputnik's management was angry because they prefer that their reporters remain anonymous. He also said that Sputnik editors wanted him to bring up the Seth Rich conspiracy theory at White House press briefings and to write about it for their news wire.

Feinberg stated that Sputnik's management had been upset with the publicity he received after another Washington Post article said how he aggressively questioned White House OMB Director Mick Mulvaney over plans to restrict the Earned Income Tax Credit to families with parents who are in the United States legally, even if undocumented/illegal immigrants have American citizen children and pay enough taxes to be eligible for the EITC. The exchange was covered by Dana Milbank of The Washington Post.

In an interview with Brian Stelter of CNN, Feinberg noted that another source of tension with Sputnik's management was their insistence on pre-approving questions he would ask at White House press briefings, and that they would often order him to ask questions that were based on completely false premises to push narratives that "don't comport with reality." After a lawsuit by private investigator Rod Wheeler against Fox News alleged that members of the Trump administration had a hand crafting a story (which was later retracted) which pushed the Seth Rich murder-conspiracy theory, Feinberg told Joy-Ann Reid of MSNBC that it was "troubling" that both the White House and a Russian propaganda service were both attempting to promote the discredited story.

Shortly after publication of a Politico article in which he documented his experiences, Yahoo News reported that on September 11, 2017, Feinberg met with an FBI Special Agent and an Assistant US Attorney from the National Security Division of the US Department of Justice at their request as part of an investigation into whether Sputnik should be required to register as foreign propaganda under the 1938 Foreign Agents Registration Act. At that meeting, during which he provided information on "internal structure, editorial processes, and funding", Feinberg turned over a flash drive containing over 6,000 internal emails—every message he'd sent or received during his tenure at Sputnik—including messages pertaining to the percentage of funding Sputnik receives from Russia's government and his editors insistence that he pre-clear all White House briefing questions with them.

Kremlin Press Secretary Dmitri Peskov condemned the FBI's questioning of the former Sputnik reporter (who spoke with the FBI voluntarily), telling the TASS news agency," "We don’t have detailed information, but in any case questionings of journalists or ex-journalists, but in connection with their journalist activity, clearly don’t speak well for pluralism of opinions and freedom of the media. They rather suggest that serious problems are emerging with censorship and restriction of the field for media work."

Feinberg dismissed concerns that such an investigation posed any threat to press freedom, telling the Columbia Journalism Review that “Sputnik does not operate like any news organization I have worked for or I have ever seen.”

=== Current work ===
Feinberg has been a regular contributor to The Independent since 2019 and is currently a full-time correspondent there assigned to cover the White House as well as Capitol Hill and other US politics matters. He previously held various roles with Breakfast Media LLC, publishers of the technology/telecommunications news site BroadbandBreakfast.com and the general political news site BeltwayBreakfast.com from 2008-2010 and from 2018-2019. From late 2017 to mid 2018 he worked part-time as an editor and political reporter for the Montgomery County Sentinel.

On March 28, 2020, Feinberg announced that he was joining Newsweek as the publication's White House correspondent, but his contributions to the website stopped after approximately a month. In August 2020, after the site published an op-ed claiming that Senator Kamala Harris was not eligible to be Vice President because her parents were both immigrants, Feinberg alluded to disagreements with management in which he was told certain White House officials were "off-limits."

Days after the 2021 US Capitol riots, Feinberg reported for The Independent that former Trump White House staffers had told him that then-President Trump would have been aware of extremist groups' plans to storm the Capitol because his social media manager, Dan Scavino, monitored extremist forums such as Parler and TheDonald.win.

His report was cited by House Democrats during Donald Trump's second impeachment trial, including in the House managers' trial brief and during a presentation on the Senate floor by Del. Stacey Plaskett.

On June 7, 2023, Feinberg was the first journalist to report that Special Counsel Jack Smith would ask a grand jury to indict Donald Trump as early as Thursday, June 8.

==== Clashes with Kellyanne Conway during the Trump administration ====
Feinberg gained a measure of public attention during the Trump administration for a series of interactions with Kellyanne Conway, who then served as Counselor to the President, during question-and-answer sessions with reporters.

During one such interaction on May 29, 2019, Feinberg confronted Conway over whether she believed she had violated the Hatch Act by endorsing Alabama Senate candidate Roy Moore during a 2018 special election. Conway's reply, "let me know when the jail sentence starts," was cited by the Office of Special Counsel in a report recommending that she be removed from federal service.

Six weeks later, Feinberg asked Conway what countries President Trump was suggesting that members of "The Squad" should return to during a media availability at the White House. She responded by demanding to know his ethnic background.

Conway's retort was widely condemned, with CNN's Chris Cilizza calling the exchange "outrageous" and "unreal." Feinberg later told CNN's Don Lemon that he had "no earthly clue what either her question or the answer [he] could have given to that question had to do with what the President said or to what country she was referring.”
