= It's a Wonderful Life (opera) =

Opera by Jake Heggie

- Opera by Jake Heggie
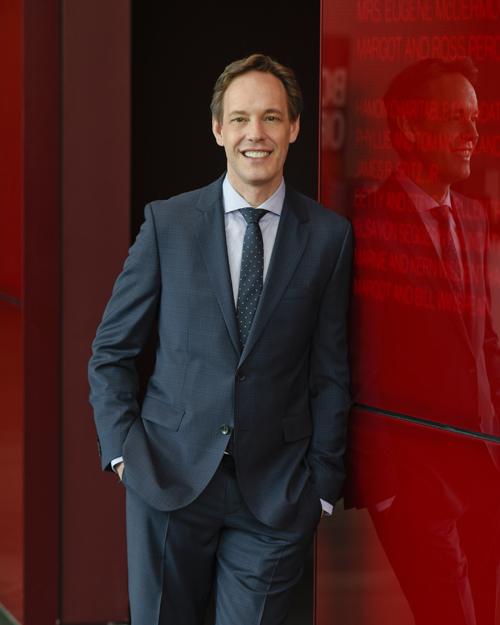
- The opera's composer
- Librettist: Gene Scheer
- Premiere: December 2, 2016; Houston Grand Opera

It's a Wonderful Life is an opera by Jake Heggie to a libretto by Gene Scheer based on the 1946 film. The opera premiered at the Houston Grand Opera on December 2, 2016.

== Recording ==
- William Burden (George Bailey), Andrea Carroll (Mary Hatch), Zoie Reams (angel); Houston Grand Opera Orchestra, conductor: Patrick Summers, Pentatone

== See also ==
- List of Christmas operas
