= Julia Gaines =

American percussionist and academic

Julia Hillbrick Gaines
- Born: 1969 (age 56–57); Bellevue, Washington
- Occupation: Academic Administrator

Academic background
- Education: Lawrence University; Eastman School of Music; University of Oklahoma

Academic work
- Institutions: University of Missouri; School of Music
- Website: music.missouri.edu/people/gaines

Julia Hillbrick Gaines is an American percussionist and academic. From 2014-2023, she was director of the School of Music at the University of Missouri in Columbia, Missouri. She has performed worldwide as a soloist, and released her first album, Tiger Dance, in 2017. She was on the International Board of Directors of the Percussive Arts Society, and became secretary. She has performed with the Missouri Symphony, the Oklahoma City Philharmonic, the Fox Valley Symphony, and the Green Bay Symphony Orchestra. She has served as associate editor for Percussive Notes, a scholarly journal of the Percussive Arts Society, and became associate editor of the Keyboard Percussion section.

== Early life and education ==
Julia Gaines was born in 1969 in Bellevue, Washington, and by second grade had moved to Moscow, Idaho. There, she began learning the piano, and switched to percussion. She graduated from Moscow High School in 1987 and went on to attend the Lawrence University Conservatory of Music in Appleton, Wisconsin. Gaines was a member of the Santa Clara Vanguard Drum and Bugle Corps, which won a national title in 1989. She earned a master's degree from Eastman School of Music and a PhD from the University of Oklahoma.

== Career ==
Gaines joined the faculty of the University of Missouri School of Music in 1996. She was professor of percussion for eighteen years, then director of the School of Music in 2014, succeeding Robert Shay. She is a member of Pi Kappa Lambda. After nine years as director, in 2023, she took research leave to write a new marimba book and create instructional videos.

== Works ==
- Gaines, Julia (2018). Sequential Studies (BOOK 1) for Four-Mallet Marimba: Level 1: the very beginning. Portland, Oregon: Tapspace.
- Gaines, Julia (2019). Sequential Studies (BOOK 2) for Four-Mallet Marimba: Level 2: the heart of the chorale. Portland, Oregon: Tapspace.
- Gaines, Julia (2025). Sequential Studies (BOOK 3) for Four-Mallet Marimba: Level 3...Laterals, Triples, and Combos, Oh My!. Portland, Oregon: Tapspace.
