= Ludwig Mittelhammer =

German baritone

Ludwig Mittelhammer (born 1988) is a German operatic and concert baritone.

== Life ==
Born in Munich, Mittelhammer studied singing at the University of Music and Performing Arts Munich from 2009 to 2015. From September 2011 to 2014, he was a member of the Bayerische Theaterakademie August Everding. Master classes with Dietrich Fischer-Dieskau, Brigitte Fassbaender, Ann Murray and Edith Wiens complemented his training.

Together with the pianist Jonathan Ware, he won first prize at the Internationaler Wettbewerb für Liedkunst of the International Hugo-Wolf Academy Stuttgart in 2014. At the Felix Mendelssohn Bartholdy Competition of the Berlin University of the Arts, he was previously awarded a special prize for the best interpretation of a Goethe song by Wolfgang Rihm.

Since the 2015/16 season, Mittelhammer has been a member of the Oper Frankfurt opera studio. There, he could be heard in the 2016/17 season in the roles of Marullo in Rigoletto and Schaunard in La Bohème. In the 2017/18 season, he took on various leading roles as a guest at the Staatstheater Nürnberg.

As a concert soloist, Mittelhammer has appeared with the Orchestre de Paris, Münchner Rundfunkorchester, Concerto Köln, Kammerorchester des Symphonieorchesters des Bayerischen Rundfunks and Münchener Kammerorchester. He has worked with the conductors Jaap van Zweden, Michael Hofstetter, Alexander Liebreich and Ulf Schirmer. Highlights in 2017 include concerts with the Swedish Radio Symphony Orchestra under Daniel Harding in Stockholm's Berwald Hall, Bruckner's masses with the RIAS Kammerchor, Telemann cantatas with the NDR Chor and the Akademie für Alte Musik Berlin, and several recitals, including at the Wigmore Hall in London and the Muziekgebouw in Eindhoven.

== Awards ==
- 2014: First prize at the International Competition for Lied Art of the Hugo Wolf Academy Stuttgart.
- 2015: Bayerischer Kunstförderpreis in der Sparte Darstellende Kunst
