= Michael Dunn (American football) =

American football player (born 1994)

Profile
- Position: Guard

Personal information
- Born: August 28, 1994 (age 32); Bethesda, Maryland, U.S.
- Listed height: 6 ft 5 in (1.96 m)
- Listed weight: 315 lb (143 kg)

Career information
- High school: Walt Whitman (Bethesda)
- College: Maryland (2012–2016)
- NFL draft: 2017: undrafted

Career history
- Los Angeles Rams (2017–2018)*; Jacksonville Jaguars (2018)*; Birmingham Iron (2019); Miami Dolphins (2019)*; Seattle Dragons (2020); Cleveland Browns (2020–2024); San Francisco 49ers (2025)*; Los Angeles Chargers (2025)*
- * Offseason or practice squad member only

Career NFL statistics as of 2025
- Games played: 53
- Games started: 9
- Stats at Pro Football Reference

Michael Dunn (born August 28, 1994) is an American professional football guard. He played college football for the Maryland Terrapins. He made his NFL debut in 2020 with the Cleveland Browns.

== Early and personal life ==
Dunn was born and grew up in Bethesda, Maryland, and is Jewish. His parents are David and Tamara Dunn, and he has two siblings, Renee and Eitan.

He attended Walt Whitman High School in Bethesda. Competing for the school's football team, Dunn played offensive tackle and guard. As a senior, he was named second-team all-county.

Dunn attended the University of Maryland, graduating in 2016 with a degree in Economics. While there he played college football starting 48 games from 2013-16 for the Terrapins, including 37 consecutive games. He was 2x Honorable Mention All-Big Ten (2015 and 2016), and 3x All-Big Ten Academic Selection (2014, 2015, and 2016). In 2016 the Touchdown Club of Annapolis Maryland awarded Dunn the Louis L Goldstein Golden Helmet for the Most Outstanding Player on the University of Maryland football team—the only offensive lineman to win this honor in the history of the award. After his senior season, he had labrum surgery, which prevented him from participating in Pro Day.

Dunn married The Athletic podcast producer Marissa Morris, whom he started dating in 2016, in February 2022. They have a daughter who was born in 2023.

== Professional career ==
Pre-draft measurables
Height	Weight	Arm length	Hand span
6 ft 4 5/8 in (1.95 m)	300 lb (136 kg)	31 5/8 in (0.80 m)	9 3/4 in (0.25 m)
All values from Pro Day

=== Los Angeles Rams ===
After going undrafted in the 2017 NFL draft, Dunn had a rookie minicamp tryout with the Los Angeles Rams in May 2017. He signed with the team on June 15, 2017. He was waived during final roster cuts on September 2, 2017, and signed to the Rams' practice squad the following day. Dunn was released from the Rams' practice squad on September 5, 2017.

Dunn re-signed with the Rams on February 22, 2018. He was waived on June 5, 2018.

=== Jacksonville Jaguars ===
Dunn signed with the Jacksonville Jaguars on July 31, 2018. He was waived during final roster cuts on September 1, and signed to the team's practice squad on September 19. He was released on October 16, and re-signed to the practice squad on November 27.

=== Birmingham Iron ===
Dunn signed with the Birmingham Iron of the Alliance of American Football (AAF) on January 15, 2019.

=== Miami Dolphins ===
After the AAF suspended league operations eight weeks into its season, Dunn was signed by the Miami Dolphins on April 9, 2019. He was waived during final roster cuts on August 31.

=== Seattle Dragons ===
Dunn was selected by the Seattle Dragons of the XFL in the sixth round of the second phase of the 2020 XFL draft on October 15, 2019. He had his contract terminated when the league suspended operations on April 10, 2020.

=== Cleveland Browns ===
Dunn was signed by the Cleveland Browns on August 9, 2020. He was waived during final roster cuts on September 5, and signed to their practice squad the next day. Dunn was elevated to the active roster on November 14, November 21, November 28, and December 19 for the team's weeks 10, 11, 12, and 15 games against the Houston Texans, Philadelphia Eagles, Jaguars, and New York Giants, and reverted to the practice squad after each game. He was signed to the Browns' active roster on December 23.

Dunn's first career start came on January 10, 2021, in the Browns' 48-37 playoff victory against the Pittsburgh Steelers. Dunn started after left guard Joel Bitonio tested positive for COVID-19. Dunn did not allow a single pressure in pass protection. On January 12, 2021, Dunn was placed on injured reserve.

On August 31, 2021, Dunn was named in the Browns 53-man opening day roster for the 2021 season.

The Browns placed an exclusive-rights free agent tender on Dunn on March 7, 2022. He was placed on injured reserve on November 19.

On August 29, 2023, Dunn was released by the Browns and re-signed to the practice squad. He was promoted to the active roster on September 12. He was placed on injured reserve on October 17, with a calf injury. He was activated on November 18.

On March 14, 2024, Dunn re-signed with the Browns. He was placed on the reserve/non-football illness list to start the season. He was activated on October 5.

=== San Francisco 49ers ===
On August 20, 2025, Dunn signed a one-year contract with the San Francisco 49ers. He was released on August 26 as part of final roster cuts.

=== Los Angeles Chargers ===
On September 30, 2025, Dunn signed with the Los Angeles Chargers' practice squad. He was released on October 7.

== See also ==
- List of select Jewish football players
