= Ordinary Light =

2015 book by Tracy K. Smith

Ordinary Light: A Memoir
- Author: Tracy K. Smith
- Language: English
- Genre: Memoir
- Publisher: Alfred A. Knopf
- Publication date: March 31, 2015
- Publication place: United States
- Media type: Print, Ebook
- Pages: 368 pp.
- ISBN: 9780307962669 (hardcover 1st ed.)
- Website: Ordinary Light at Penguin Random House

Ordinary Light: A Memoir is a 2015 book by poet Tracy K. Smith. It describes Smith's upbringing as a middle-class black girl, especially her close relationship with her mother, and then her mother’s illness and death while Smith was in college. Ordinary Light was a finalist for the 2015 National Book Award for Nonfiction.

== Development and publication history ==
Smith described the process of writing the memoir as becoming "an investigator of [her] own life", comparing recollections with her siblings and finding memory to be a "flawed lens". She began writing Ordinary Light in 2009, though had long wanted to write the memoir, born of a desire to write about her mother, who died in 1994 as Smith was graduating from college; Smith made initial efforts beginning in 1999 but found the pieces difficult to finish. Later, working with German writer Hans Manus Enzensberger in the context of the Rolex Mentor and Protégé Arts Initiative, Smith found that the structure of exchanging work as well as Enzensberger's feedback helped move the project forward. Smith has also said that becoming a parent herself—her daughter was an infant when Smith was writing the book--gave her insight necessary to writing about her mother: "Not only did I have access to my own feelings and recollections but suddenly I had a way of imagining what my mother, as a parent, might have been thinking and worrying about, and weighing in her mind."

The 368-page book was published by Alfred A. Knopf on April 2, 2015.

== Content and style ==
Writing in Slate, Stacia L. Brown says that "most of the time", Ordinary Light is "a coming-of-age story about a middle-class black girl with a relatively idyllic life...the story of the healthy, nurturing bond between a black mother and daughter." However, Brown found the book "most powerful when it returns to the subject" with which Smith opens the narrative: "her mother’s illness and Smith’s slow-dawning realization that she will not recover"—Smith's mother died shortly after Smith graduated from college.

Smith, whose first books were poetry, has said that in retrospect, the move to writing in prose was a necessity for her to engage the story of her relationship with her mother. "I had found a way of exploring my own private material in poems. I knew the kinds of answers—that’s not the right noun because I don't think a poem solves things—but I knew the kind of encounter I was capable of creating in a poem. I realized that if I wanted to get something new out of that material I needed to shift languages."

== Reception ==
Ordinary Light received widely favorable reviews and was named a finalist for the 2015 National Book Award for Nonfiction.
