= Jonathan Ware =

American pianist

Jonathan Ware (born 1984) is an American pianist, Lied accompanist and academic teacher.

== Life ==
Born in Texas, Ware studied at the Eastman School of Music in Rochester, at the Juilliard School in New York City and at the Hochschule für Musik "Hanns Eisler". As a Lied accompanist, he has performed in major venues in Europe and the US, including with Benjamin Appl, Christiane Oelze, Golda Schultz, Elsa Dreisig and Ludwig Mittelhammer. For several years, he participated to the Heidelberger Frühling Festival Academy. He teaches at the Hanns Eisler Academy of Music and the Barenboim–Said Akademie in Berlin.

== Awards ==
- 2014: Internationaler Wettbewerb für Liedkunst of the Internationale Hugo-Wolf-Akademie – 1st prize.
- 2012: International song competition "Das Lied" – Pianist award
- 2011: Wigmore Hall / Kohn Foundation International Song Competition – Pianist award
- 2005: Kingsville International Young Performer's Competition – 1st prize
- 2002: Missouri Southern International Piano Competition – 2nd prize
- 2002: New York International Piano Competition – 4th prize

== Recordings ==
- 2020: Morgen with Elsa Dreisig (Erato Records)
- 2019: Schubert – Wolf – Medtner with Ludwig Mittelhammer (Berlin Classics)
- 2016: A Portrait mit Emalie Savoy, Brandenburgisches Staatsorchester Frankfurt and Matthias Foremny (Genuin)
