= Elsa Dreisig =

French-Danish soprano

- Born: 1991 (age 33–34); Paris, France
- Education: Conservatoire de Paris; University of Music and Theatre Leipzig
- Occupation: Operatic soprano
- Organizations: Berlin State Opera

Elsa Dreisig (born 1991) is a French-Danish operatic soprano. Based at the Berlin State Opera, she made a European career in both opera and concert. Her opera roles include, besides the standard lyric soprano repertoire such as Mozart's Fiordiligi and Bizet's Micaëla, Baroque opera such as Rameau's Hippolyte et Aricie, and the world premiere of Beat Furrer's Violetter Schnee.

== Life ==
=== Training ===
Dreisig was born in Paris, the daughter of the Danish opera singer Inge Dreisig and the French singer, conductor and director Gilles Ramade. She sang in the children's choirs of the Opéra Royal de Wallonie and the Opéra National de Lyon. She studied singing with Valérie Guillorit at the Conservatoire de Paris, and at the University of Music and Theatre Leipzig with Regina Werner-Dietrich.

=== Opera career ===
From 2015 to 2017, Dreisig was a member of the opera studio of the Staatsoper Unter den Linden, leading to a permanent engagement by Daniel Barenboim. She appeared there as Gretel in Humperdinck's Hänsel und Gretel, as Pamina in Mozart's Die Zauberflöte, in the title role of Verdi's La traviata, as Euridice in Gluck's Orfeo ed Euridice and as Dircé in Cherubini's Médée. In the 2018/19 season, she performed as Diane in Rameau's Hippolyte et Aricie, conducted by Simon Rattle, and took part as Natascha in the world premiere of Beat Furrer's Violetter Schnee, directed by Claus Guth and conducted by Matthias Pintscher.

In 2015, she achieved first prize at the Neue Stimmen competition and placed second, behind Lise Davidsen, at the Queen Sonja International Music Competition. In 2016, she won first prize at the Operalia singing competition in Guadalajara, created by Plácido Domingo. and was voted "Newcomer of the Year" in the critics' choice of the Opernwelt magazine. She was also awarded the Victoires de la Musique Classique award in the category "vocal discovery".

Dreisig first appeared at the Aix-en-Provence Festival in 2017 as Micaëla in Bizet's Carmen, and first at the Paris Opera. In 2018, she performed as Musetta in Puccini's La Bohème at the Opernhaus Zürich, and as Lauretta in Gianni Schicchi at the Paris Opera. In 2019, she was Zerlina in Mozart's Don Giovanni and Elvira in Bellini's I puritani, again at the Paris Opera. In late 2019, she first appeared at the Royal Opera House in London as Pamina. In August 2020, she first performed on stage at the Salzburg Festival in as Fiordiligi in Mozart's Così fan tutte, staged by Christof Loy. In January 2021, she performed the title role in Massenet's Manon produced by David Bösch at the Staatsoper Hamburg. Due to the COVID-19 pandemic, the performance took place without audience but was broadcast via livestreaming by Norddeutscher Rundfunk.

=== Concert singer ===
In 2017, Dreisig undertook a European tour with the Berlin Philharmonic conducted by Simon Rattle, singing in Haydn's Die Schöpfung, including her first time at the Salzburg Festival. She appeared with the London Symphony Orchestra in Beethoven's Christus am Ölberg, as well as with the Staatskapelle Berlin, the Vienna Philharmonic, the Munich Philharmonic and the West-Eastern Divan Orchestra. She has worked with conductors such as Daniel Barenboim, Fabio Luisi, Franz Welser-Möst, Massimo Zanetti and David Zinman.

In 2018, she released her first solo album Miroir(s) on Warner Classics / Erato Records, for which she was nominated in the category Recital at the International Opera Awards 2019. In 2020, the second album was released, Morgen, with pianist Jonathan Ware.

== Awards and nominations ==
- 2015: Neue Stimmen – first prize.
- 2015: Queen Sonja International Music Competition – second prize.
- 2016: Operalia – first prize.
- 2016: Opernwelt – Distinction as "Nachwuchskünstlerin des Jahres" (female newcomer of the year)
- 2016: Victoires de la Musique Classique – Distinction as "sängerische Entdeckung" (singer discovered).
- 2019: International Opera Awards 2019 – Nomination for Miroir(s) in the recital category.
- 2020: Echo Klassik – Nomination in the Nachwuchskünstlerin Gesang (female vocal newcomer) category.

== Recordings ==
- 2018: Miroir(s) : opera arias, Warner Music Group OCLC 1256065760
- 2020: Morgen with Jonathan Ware, piano, Parlophone Records OCLC 1146037417
