= Jon Miller (television executive) =

American businessman (born 1956)

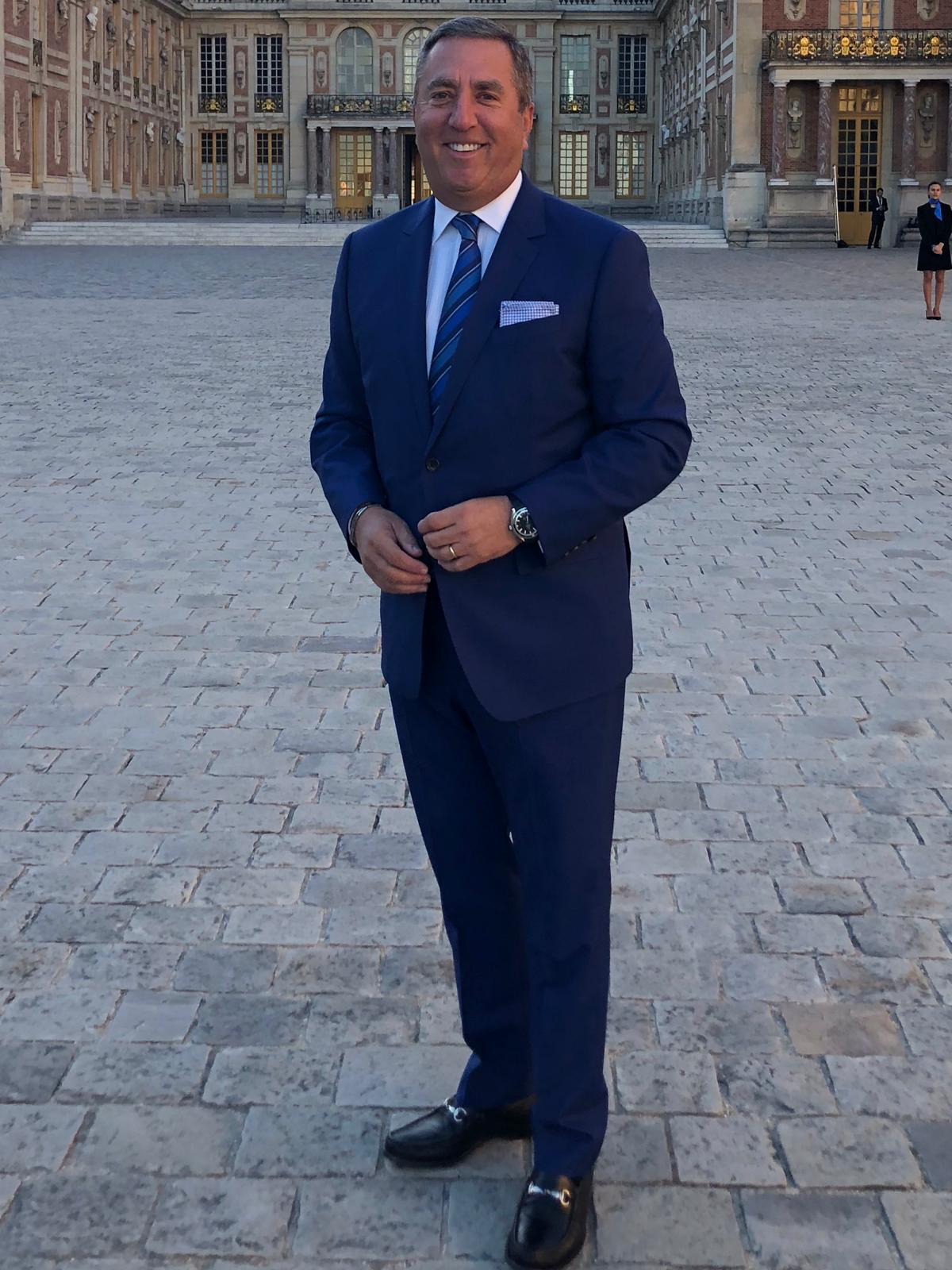
- Born: Jonathan Miller; November 14, 1956 (age 70); Washington DC, United States
- Occupation: American television executive NBC
- Spouse: Jan Miller
- Children: 2

Jon Miller (born November 14, 1956) is an American television executive for NBC Sports, a division of NBCUniversal. He joined NBC in 1978, and was named President of Sports Programming in 2011. He is responsible for the creation of the NHL Winter Classic and the National Dog Show among other events. During his tenure, he has worked with every major sports league in the US.

== Early life ==
Miller was born in Washington, D.C., but grew up in Bethesda, Maryland. He attended Walt Whitman High School and subsequently earned his bachelor's degree in business administration from Miami University in Oxford, Ohio.

== Career ==
=== Early days ===
Miller started worked as an account executive for WRC-TV in Washington, D.C., in October 1978. While at WRC, he created the George Michael Sports Final, the precursor to the George Michael Sports Machine, which was the first nationally distributed sports highlight show in television. After moving to New York to sell national advertising for the NBC Stations Group, he joined the NBC Sports & Olympics Sales department. In 1988, he was promoted to Vice President of Programming, Planning & Development for NBC Sports.

=== Programming ===
Miller worked under the leadership of Dick Ebersol on the programming team. Soon after, NBC lost the rights to Major League Baseball for the first time in 40 years, a major shock to the network. To help fill the void, Miller created the NBC Sports Ventures unit which aimed to create events that NBC used to generate non-traditional revenue streams. Among the major events he created include golf's PNC Championship, the National Heads-Up Poker Championship and the Collegiate Rugby Championship. Four other events changed the world of sports programming:

==== National Dog Show ====
The National Dog Show debuted on NBC in 2002 on Thanksgiving Day. Miller was searching for something to fill the time between the annual Macy's Thanksgiving Day Parade and NFL games. A few months earlier, in January 2002 Miller and his wife, Jan, rented Best in Show for a movie night with their neighbors. “When they (the neighbors) left, I watched it a second time and found it hysterically funny,” Miller remembers. He contacted the Kennel Club of Philadelphia to ask if they would allow NBC to broadcast their event. They agreed, and the annual broadcast of the National Dog Show on Thanksgiving Day was born, quickly becoming a Thanksgiving Day tradition.

==== NHL Winter Classic ====
On January 1, 2008, the Buffalo Sabres hosted the first NHL Winter Classic, an outdoor game attended by a then-record 71,217 fans at Ralph Wilson Stadium, now known as Highmark Stadium. The game, in which Pittsburgh’s Sidney Crosby scored the shootout winner, was a massive hit. The NHL Winter Classic claimed a spot on the New Year’s Day sports calendar, and has consistently delivered the highest viewership number of the NHL regular season. The game aired on NBC through 2021.

==== American Century Celebrity Golf Classic ====
The American Century Celebrity Golf Classic, is a celebrity pro-am held annually in Lake Tahoe. NBC announced that it signed a six-year extension to keep the American Century Golf Classic running through 2029, which will be the 40th playing of the event.

==== Premier League TV Coverage ====
Miller was a key executive in helping NBC Sports land the initial Premier League rights deal for what eventually would be 10 years. Beating many competitors, some with higher bids, in November 2021, that extended to 15 years with a $2.7 billion deal and a six-year term ending in 2028. To promote its investment, NBC has hosted Premier League fan festivals in eight different cities: Washington, D.C., New York, Boston, Austin, Miami, Los Angeles, Philadelphia and Orlando. “We were able to press upon the Premier League something that I’ve said since day one,” explained Miller. “We’re not the network of soccer. We have no desire to be the network of soccer. But we do want to be the network of the Premier League.”

Also in his time at NBC Sports, Miller has been involved in acquiring and programming sports properties including the NHL, Notre Dame Football, the French Open, horse racing's Triple Crown, the Breeders' Cup, NFL on NBC, MLB, Wimbledon, Formula One, NASCAR, The Indianapolis 500, Tour de France, NBA, US Open Golf, PGA Tour, Ryder Cup, Presidents Cup, Rugby World Cup and America's Cup. In 2020, Miller led the team that brought the US Open back to NBC after five years on Fox.

Miller created the strategy and led the negotiations that resulted in NBC’s August 2022 media rights agreement with the Big Ten Conference that started in 2023 and runs through 2030, launching a new football brand for the league in Big Ten Saturday Night on NBC.This deal, worth $2.45 billion, ended the Big Ten/ABC relationship that dated back to 1966.

In September 2024, following NBC Sports' completion of an 11-year deal for the NBA and WNBA, Miller participated as a panelist at the IMG-RedBird Summit.

== Recognition ==
In November 2022, Miller was inducted into the SportPro Hall of Fame, an award that recognizes the body of work of an individual within the sports broadcast and OTT industry.
