= Gregory Spears =

American composer

- Born: Virginia
- Education: Eastman School of Music, Yale University, Princeton University
- Musical career
- Occupation: composer
- Labels: Fanfare Cincinnati, New Amsterdam Records
- Website: www.gregoryspears.com

Gregory Spears is an American composer of instrumental and operatic works that blend aspects of romanticism, minimalism, and early music. Among his best known works are the operas Fellow Travelers and Paul's Case, as well as his Requiem.

== Early life and education ==
Spears grew up in Virginia. He attended Eastman School of Music, received a master's degree at Yale University, and earned his Ph.D. at Princeton University. He studied with Hans Abrahamsen and Per Nørgård while a Fulbright Scholar at the Royal Danish Academy of Music.

Spears is openly gay, and has said the experience of being closeted in the 1990s affected how he adapted the story of Fellow Travelers as an opera.

== Career ==
His opera Fellow Travelers, adapted from the novel of the same name by Thomas Mallon with a libretto by Greg Pierce, premiered at Cincinnati Opera on June 17, 2016 and has since then been produced across the United States and has garnered many positive reviews. Anthony Tommasini in The New York Times wrote: "Originality in the arts is a vague and overhyped virtue. Few works are completely original. All creative artists borrow from others, both masters they revere and contemporaries they may be in competition with. Still, originality just comes through sometimes, as the composer Gregory Spears demonstrates in his personal, boldly quirky score for the wrenching, and sadly timely, opera Fellow Travelers." And John von Rhein wrote in the Chicago Tribune: "Spears is unusually sensitive to the irregular cadences of American speech, and his setting of words to music is masterly... "Fellow Travelers" is one of the most accomplished new American operas I have encountered in recent years." Since its world premiere, it has received over 13 productions by companies such as Lyric Opera of Chicago, Prototype Festival, Minnesota Opera, Florida Grand Opera, Boston Lyric Opera, Des Moines Metro Opera, Virginia Opera, Arizona Opera, and more.

His opera Castor and Patience was commissioned for Cincinnati Opera's 100th anniversary season with an original libretto by Tracy K. Smith. The world premiere was delayed due to the COVID-19 pandemic from 2020 to July 2022. The opera received a Critic's Pick from The New York Times and was also named in The New York Times Best Classical Music Performances of 2022. Zachary Woolfe in his review for The New York Times describes the work: "The agonies and pleasures of Castor and Patience,... are like those of a less densely orchestrated Puccini. As in Tosca, La bohème or Madama Butterfly, unabashedly, even shamelessly effusive vocal lines draw us poignantly close to characters in a rending situation: here, a Black family riven by disagreement over whether to sell part of a precious plot of land."

Gregory Spears and Tracy K. Smith's opera The Righteous was commissioned by Santa Fe Opera and made its world premiere there in summer 2024. The opera received a Critic's Pick from The New York Times and was shortlisted for an International Opera Award.

He currently teaches composition at State University of New York at Purchase and New York University.

== Style ==
Spears' music often draws on earlier musical styles processed through contemporary minimalist techniques.

Writing in The New York Times in 2026, Joshua Barone said of Spears' work, “Time is a funny, enigmatic thing in “Sleepers Awake,” and the same could be said about much of Spears’s work. He has dramatized the passage of time but also looped it into sculpture and space. His sound flattens music history into a single plane shared by medieval song, Minimalism and more.” Spears himself has traced this technique to an early tension between his admiration for Mahler's late-Romantic lyricism and Reich's static, repetitive Minimalism, a contradiction he resolves by synthesizing rather than choosing between the two idioms. He has described his Minimalist writing as an act of ritualized preservation, saying "Minimalism is about trying to take a moment and preserve it for eternity, about how to turn a musical moment into space". He has applied a related juxtaposition throughout his catalog, pairing Baroque-style ornament with repetitive phrasing in Paul's Case (2013) and troubadour-influenced melody with Puccini-like lyricism in Fellow Travelers (2016).

Other critics have located this hybrid style within a different framework. In a 2026 profile in Parterre Box, writer Patrick Clement James argued that Spears's music is better understood through the lens of Romanticism than through stylistic labels like Minimalism or early music alone, writing that what distinguishes Spears is not that he imitates Romanticism's musical forms but that he pursues its "theoretical objectives, the conviction that art can transform the banal rather than merely describe it." As an illustration, James pointed to Paul's Case, arguing that Spears' setting transforms Willa Cather's clinical, distanced narration of the title character into "a shimmering constellation of dreams and longing," intensifying rather than resolving the story's tension between aesthetic transcendence and ordinary suffering. Spears has described an aesthetic outlook consistent with this reading, resisting the idea that beauty or artistic inspiration can be fully explained: "one of the things we can't understand," he said, "is beauty." Spears has set Romantic-era writers directly, including the early song cycle The Romantics, on texts by Shelley, Coleridge, and Poe, and Walden, based on the text by Henry David Thoreau.

== Critical reception ==
Reviewing Spears' opera Sleepers Awake for Seen and Heard International, Daniele Sahr situated the score within the broader trajectory of Spears's catalog, writing that "the score proved a superb example of the style Spears has developed in his ever-increasing oeuvre which mines soundscapes from Renaissance polyphony and incorporates them into the contrapuntal explorations at the root of his music," and tracing the technique to the "long duration, time-versus-pitch compositional structures pioneered by Morton Feldman and Christian Wolff in the 1970s." Sahr concluded that in Sleepers Awake, Spears "presents his aesthetic with an unquestionable skill that succeeds at matching it with a story — no small feat for such abstract formulations of sound."

The New York Times's Corinna da Fonseca-Wollheim described his opera Fellow Travelers: "But what makes Fellow Travelers such a satisfying operatic experience is the old-fashioned combination of a swift-flowing and deft libretto and gorgeous music." Alex Ross in The New Yorker elaborates: "The harmony is largely tonal, but it is anti-Romantic in effect, tending instead toward a decorous neo-Baroque sensibility. Voices and instruments often perform courtly pirouettes against sustained chords and even pulses. The atmosphere is one of hushed disclosure: the music implies more than it says. What emerges is a potently ambiguous sound world that conveys human warmth and chill in equal measure. Above all, it is a transparent medium in which singing actors can speak instead of shout."

Heidi Waleson described Spears' compositional style in her Wall Street Journal review of the opera O Columbia: "Mr. Spears writes brilliantly for vocal ensembles. Starting with neoclassical-style clarity, he builds textured, complex musical structures that sound old and new at the same time, and his skillful text settings use minimalist-like repetition to give Mr. Vavrek's pointed, thoughtful words even more power and emotional specificity."

David Patrick Stearns, in his Philadelphia Inquirer review of Spears' Requiem, described his musical influences: "Spears intersperses the swan myth with the requiem text, much of it reflecting lyrical Baltic influences of Arvo Pärt, but with a young composer's restlessness. The swan's song is speculatively re-created with otherworldly vocal ornaments. The piece also contains counterpoint that echoes 16th-century madrigals as well as a modern sense of theatrical timing that keeps your ears on edge until the last note."

== Selected works ==
=== Opera ===
- The Bricklayer, commissioned by Houston Grand Opera, libretto by Farnoosh Moshiri, 2012
- Wolf-in-Skins, work-in-progress with choreographer and librettist Christopher Williams
- Paul's Case, world premiere at UrbanArias, libretto by Kathryn Walat, 2013
- O Columbia, commissioned by Houston Grand Opera, libretto by Royce Vavrek, 2015
- Fellow Travelers, world premiere at Cincinnati Opera, libretto by Greg Pierce, 2016
- Jason and the Argonauts, world premiere at Lyric Opera of Chicago, libretto by Kathryn Walat, 2016
- Castor and Patience, world premiere at Cincinnati Opera, libretto by Tracy K. Smith, 2022
- The Righteous, world premiere at Santa Fe Opera, libretto by Tracy K. Smith, 2024
- Sleepers Awake, world premiere at Opera Philadelphia, 2026

=== Orchestra ===
- A New Sanctus, Benedictus, and Agnus Dei for the Mozart Requiem, commissioned by Seraphic Fire and the Firebird Chamber Orchestra, 2013
- Concerto for Two Trumpets and Strings, written for trumpeter Brandon Ridenour and commissioned by the BMI Foundation/Carlos Surinach Fund and Concert Artist Guild, 2019
- Love Story, written for countertenor Anthony Roth Costanzo and commissioned by New York Philharmonic, 2021
- The Mysteries, commissioned by Columbus Symphony Orchestra, 2026

=== Film score ===
- Macbeth, directed by Kit Monkman, 2018

=== Large chamber ensemble ===
- Requiem, commissioned by Christopher Williams Dances and released by New Amsterdam Records, 2010
- Virginiana, on texts by Robert Bolling, commissioned by The Damask Ensemble and New Vintage Baroque, 2015
- The Tower and the Garden, for choir and string quartet, commissioned by The Crossing (choral ensemble), 2018
- The Neighboring Village (text by Franz Kafka), for choir and two recorders, commissioned by The Virginia Chorale, 2024
- Secrets, commissioned by Sonnambula and The Frick Collection, 2026

=== Chamber ensemble ===
- Buttonwood, for string quartet, commissioned for performance by the JACK Quartet in 2010
- Our Lady, written for Ryland Angel and The Sebastian Chamber Players, 2011
- The Census at Bethlehem, for cello and harpsichord, world premiere by Chatter at SITE Santa Fe, 2022
- String Quartet No. 2, world premiere by Chatter at SITE Santa Fe, 2022

=== Solo piano ===
- Toccata (Wild Horses), commissioned by Marika Bournaki, 2012
- Toccata (Troika), commissioned for the New York International Piano Competition by the Stecher and Horowitz Foundation, 2018
- Seven Days, written for pianist Pedja Muzijevic, world premiere by 92nd Street Y, 2021

=== Voice and piano ===
- Aquehonga, for mezzo-soprano and piano, commissioned by Five Boroughs Music Festival, 2017
- Walden, for baritone and piano, on texts by Henry David Thoreau, a song cycle commissioned for baritone Brian Mulligan by Vocal Arts DC, 2018
- Bartleby, for mezzo-soprano and piano, based on Herman Melville’s short story, commissioned for mezzo-soprano Jennifer Johnson Cano by the Tucson Desert Song Festival, 2026
