= Yi Lei =

Chinese poet (1951–2018)

- 伊蕾
- Born: Sun Guizhen; August 30, 1951; Tianjin, China
- Died: July 13, 2018 (aged 66); Iceland
- Occupation: Poet

Yi Lei (Chinese: 伊蕾, 1951–2018), born Sun Guizhen, was a Chinese poet of the 20th and early 21st centuries. She first came to prominence with the publication of her poem, "A Single Woman's Bedroom", in 1987 in People's Literature magazine.

== Biography ==
=== Early years ===
Yi Lei was born in Tianjin in 1951, the oldest of five children. Her father was a steelworker and her mother did embroidery work. The family lived in close-knit quarters in "a brick-and-tile building with a handful of other families." According to The New Yorker, "as a child, Yi Lei spent a lot of time with her uncle, a clerk at a pharmaceutical company who was infatuated with literature. By grade school, she was reading Pushkin and felt a kind of kinship with the poet. Her schooling came to a halt with the Cultural Revolution, in 1966." At that point, as part of a "reeducation movement," she was sent to the countryside. By the early 1970s, Yi Lei had become a radio broadcaster at a Luyuan steel factory in rural Hebei Province. There, she started to "write poems set in farmlands and factories."

=== Education and career ===
While in Luyuan, Yi Lei shared an apartment with a close friend, Li Yarong. Yi Lei had just lost her fiancé to leukemia. It was only after her fiancé's death that she begin to publish under the name "Yi Lei".

Yi Lei studied creative writing at the Lu Xun Academy and subsequently received a BA degree in Chinese literature from Peking University. In 1992, Yi Lei moved to Moscow, only returning to Tianjin in 2002.

Yi Lei published eight poetry collections in her lifetime; her work has been translated into Japanese, French, Italian, Russian, and English. In addition to her work as a poet, Yi Lei worked as a reporter for the Liberation Army, and as a staff member for the newspaper The Railway Corps.

=== Awards ===
Yi Lei was a recipient of the Zhuang Zhong Wen Literature Prize (also Zhuang Chongwen | 庄重文文学奖), a prize that is awarded every other year to a writer under the age of 40.

=== Death ===
Yi Lei died suddenly of a heart attack while on a 2018 trip to Iceland.

== Influences ==
Yi Lei discovered the poems of Walt Whitman in her late twenties and a line of his ("I will not make a poem nor the least part of a poem but has reference to the soul"), "became lifelong guidance and sent her off the path of communist motifs."

== Translation ==
Poet Tracy K. Smith asked Yi Lei, "through an intermediary", whether "she might translate her work with something less than literal fidelity, aiming for a 'similar spirit or feeling for readers of American English.'" After some back and forth, Yi Lei gave Smith permission to do just that. The two poets met in January 2014 at a restaurant in New York City's Chinatown. Smith worked with Changtai Bi, a longtime friend of Yi Lei's who taught English at a local college in Tianjin - Bi would translate Yi Lei's poems literally, Smith would then rework them to be more faithful sense-wise and Changtain Bi would then translate Smith's work back into Mandarin for Yi Lei's approval. This process was unexpectedly cut short by Yi Lei's death in 2018, but her works, as translated/interpreted by Smith and Changtai Bi, were published under the title My Name Will Grow Wide Like a Tree, the first major collection of Yi Lei's poems translated into English. It was shortlisted for the 2021 Griffin Poetry Prize.
