= Castor and Patience =

2022 opera by Gregory Spears

- Opera by Gregory Spears
- Librettist: Tracy K. Smith
- Language: English
- Premiere: 21 July 2022; Cincinnati Opera

Castor and Patience is an opera composed by Gregory Spears to a libretto by Tracy K. Smith, commissioned by Cincinnati Opera for its 100th anniversary season and received its world premiere there in July 2022. The opera was developed by Opera Fusion: New Works, a collaboration between Cincinnati Opera and the University of Cincinnati – College-Conservatory of Music which focuses on the creation of new American operas. The world premiere production was directed by Kevin Newbury and conducted by Kazem Abdullah.

== Roles ==
Roles, voice types, premiere cast
Role	Voice type	Premiere cast, July 21, 2022 Conductor: Kazem Abdullah
Patience	soprano	Talise Trevigne
Castor	baritone	Reginald Smith Jr.
Celeste	mezzo-soprano	Jennifer Johnson Cano
Wilhelmina	soprano	Victoria Okafor
West	baritone	Benjamin Taylor
Judah	tenor	Frederick Ballentine
Ruthie	soprano	Raven McMillon
Clarissa/Ensemble	soprano	Amber Monroe
Jane/Ensemble	mezzo-soprano	Zoie Reams
Nestor/Ensemble	tenor	Victor Ryan Robertson
Cato/Ensemble	baritone	Phillip Bullock
Second Man/Ensemble	bass-baritone	Earl Hazell

== Critical reception ==
Castor and Patience was named one of the Best Classical Music Performances of 2022 by The New York Times and was on the shortlist for the Best World Premiere in the International Opera Awards in 2022.

In his review for The New York Times, Zachary Woolfe named the performance a "Critic's Pick" and described the work as "passionate, but also clear, focused and humble" and praised the music as "so fervent, the melodies so sweet, that you can find yourself moved nearly to tears by more or less random lines."
