= Walt Whitman High School (Maryland) =

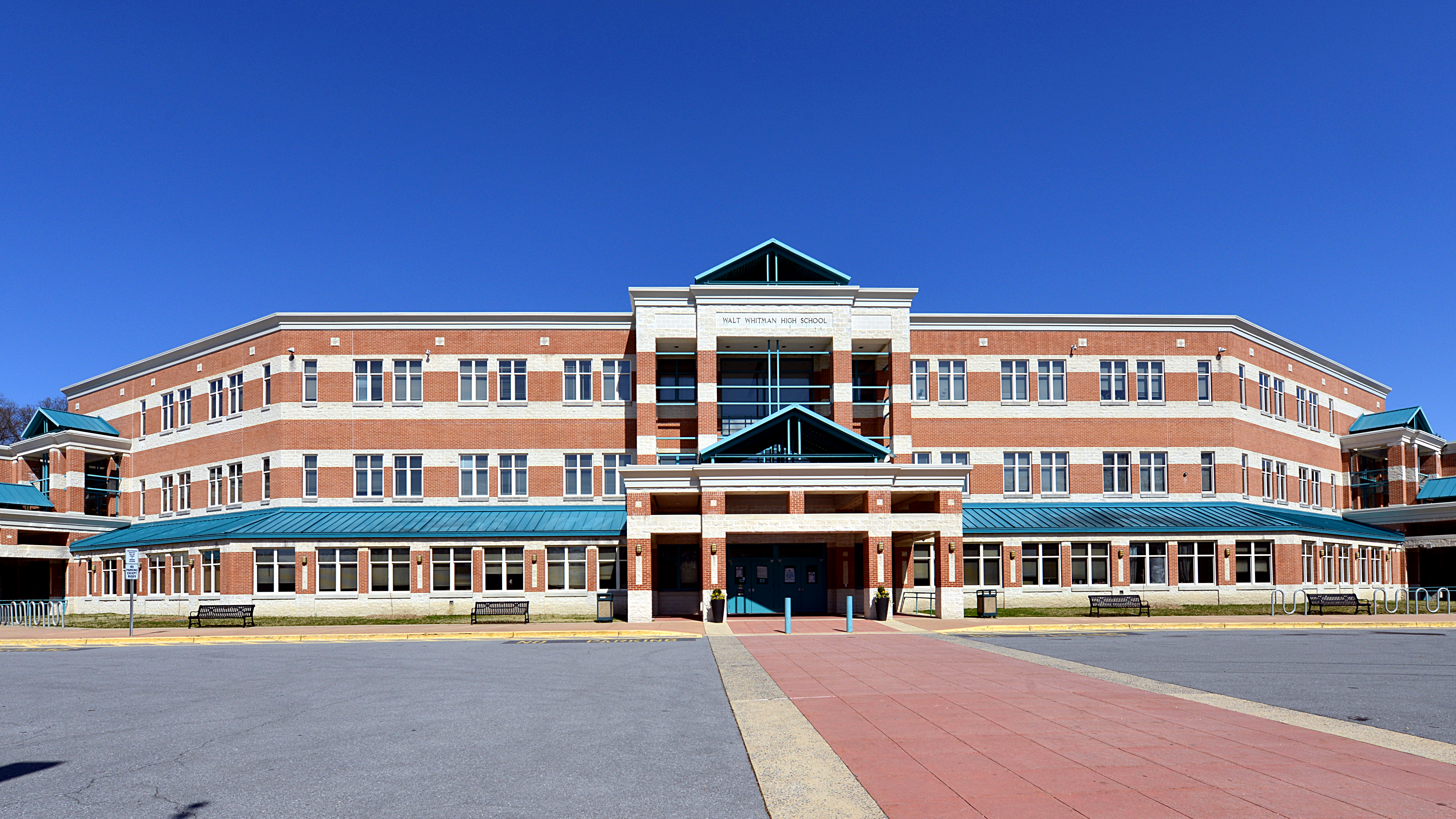

Location
- 7100 Whittier Boulevard; Bethesda, Maryland 20817; United States; 38°58′54″N 77°7′39″W

Information
- Type: Public high school
- Established: 1962; 64 years ago
- School district: Montgomery County Public Schools
- NCES District ID: 2400480
- CEEB code: 210271
- NCES School ID: 240048000941
- Principal: Gregory Miller
- Teaching staff: 116.80 FTE (2021-22)
- Grades: 9–12
- Gender: Co-educational
- Enrollment: 2,018 (2022-23)
- Student to teacher ratio: 17.28 (2022-23)
- Campus type: Small city
- Colors: Black, white, and Columbia blue
- Mascot: Vikings
- USNWR ranking: 104 (2021)
- Newspaper: The Black & White
- Yearbook: Saga
- Website: www.montgomeryschoolsmd.org/schools/whitmanhs/

Walt Whitman High School is a public high school located in Bethesda, Maryland, United States. It is named after the 19th-century American poet Walt Whitman. The school serves grades 9-12 for the Montgomery County Public Schools system.

== History ==
The school opened in the fall of 1962 with 1,418 students. Designed by local architectural firm McLeod, Ferrara & Ensign, it was built on 17 levels, with a central courtyard and a geodesic dome for its gymnasium. A Ford Foundation grant underwrote the design and construction of the dome.

In 1981, the school added a 1,176-seat auditorium. In 1992, the school demolished the geodesic dome and all other buildings except the auditorium, and constructed a new school building, which opened in the fall of 1993.

In 2021, the school completed a 75,000 sq ft (7,000 m^{2}) addition, including 18 new classrooms, which opened with the start of the 2021-22 school year.

== Academics ==
Whitman students average a score of 1312 on the SAT, averaging 654 on the reading and writing section and 659 on the math section.

As of 2024, Whitman is the 2nd-ranked high school in Maryland and the 139th-ranked nationwide, according to U.S News and World Report.

== Extracurricular activities ==
The school has an active FIRST Robotics Competition team.

=== Publications ===
The Black & White is the school's student-run newspaper. The National Scholastic Press Association Hall of Fame inducted the paper in 1991. Whitman is also notable for having the country's only student-run psychology journal. The journal circulates to over 1,000 psychology teachers across the country.

=== Athletics ===
Whitman fields sports teams in the fall, winter, and spring. The school competes as the Vikings and is part of Montgomery County Public School sports. The football field is named after long-time principal Jerome Marco.

The school has won 11 soccer state championships, including two back-to-back titles in 2018-2019. In 2021, the girls' soccer team won the state championship.

In 2024, the girls' soccer team won their fourth-straight state championship.

In 2026, the boys' wrestling team won their fourth state title. They won their first in 2005, followed by a three consecutive titles in 2024, 2025, and 2026.

In 2006, the boys' basketball team defeated Eleanor Roosevelt 39-38 to win the school's only state title. That season, Whitman leading scorer Michael Gruner was named co-gazette player of the year alongside NBA superstar Kevin Durant.

The boys' tennis team has also won state titles in 2009, 2014, and 2019.

The girls' basketball team won the state title in 2026, 2016, and 1995.

The school also has a rowing crew team that has made honorable wins in Regattas.

==== Rivalries ====
Whitman maintains rivalries with many of its neighboring schools. Its fiercest rival is Bethesda-Chevy Chase High School, but Whitman is also rivals with Churchill and Walter Johnson.

== Areas Served ==
Walt Whitman High School primarily serves students in Bethesda, but also small portions of students in Potomac and Glen Echo.

Whitman is fed by one middle school and five elementary schools:

- Thomas W. Pyle MS
  - Bannockburn ES
  - Bradley Hills ES
  - Burning Tree ES
  - Carderock Springs ES
  - Wood Acres ES

== Notable alumni ==
- Yasmeen Abutaleb, journalist and New York Times best-selling author
- Chris Anderson, journalist
- Charles L. Bennett, astrophysicist/cosmologist
- Chris Bliss, juggler/comedian
- Andrea Carroll, operatic soprano
- Alex Chappell, journalist
- Kahane Cooperman, filmmaker
- Anthony Dilweg, NFL quarterback
- David Dobkin, director
- Michael Dunn, NFL offensive lineman
- Susan Dynner, filmmaker
- Michael Eisen, biologist
- Andrew Feinberg, journalist
- Debra Granik, filmmaker
- Mark Halperin, journalist
- Pamela Harris, federal judge
- Spike Jonze, filmmaker
- Orde Kittrie, law professor
- Ryan Kuehl, NFL defensive tackle
- Brooke Lierman, Maryland Comptroller
- Abby Meyers, WNBA player
- Jon Miller, television executive
- Melika Mohammadi, soccer player
- David Moon, Maryland House of Delegates
- Mark Moores, member of the New Mexico Senate
- David Nevins, television producer
- Ashley Parker, journalist
- Mi-Ai Parrish, journalist/publisher, media executive
- Eric Pierpoint, actor
- Mark Pryor, U.S. Senator, Arkansas
- Mitchell Rales, billionaire businessman
- Steven Rales, billionaire businessman
- Giuliana Rancic, television personality
- Alexandra Robbins, author
- Kate Seelye, reporter
- Dan Shanoff, sports journalist
- Eric Steinberg, actor
- Jeff Tremaine, filmmaker
