= O Columbia =

Opera by Gregory Spears

O Columbia is an opera in three parts by Gregory Spears, with an English-language libretto by Royce Vavrek. The opera's story celebrates the American spirit of exploration and features Sir Walter Raleigh, an astronaut on the Space Shuttle Columbia and the mythological icon Lady Columbia.

The opera was commissioned by Houston Grand Opera and premiered on September 23, 2015 in a production by Kevin Newbury and conducted by Timothy Myers.

== Synopsis ==
O Columbia traces a history of dreamers and explorers–from Sir Walter Raleigh journeying to the New World, to a Houston teenager experiencing communion, and later, heartbreak, with a Columbia Space Shuttle astronaut, to future astronauts venturing to the far reaches of the Solar System-in an ode to America's pioneering spirit.

== Roles ==
Role	Voice type	Premiere cast, September 23, 2015 (Conductor: Timothy Myers)
Becca	soprano	Pureum Jo
Raleigh/Astronaut	baritone	Ben Edquist
Lady Columbia	mezzo-soprano	Megan Samarin

== Reception ==
In her review for the Wall Street Journal, Heidi Waleson commented "Mr. Spears writes brilliantly for vocal ensembles. Starting with neoclassical-style clarity, he builds textured, complex musical structures that sound old and new at the same time, and his skillful text settings use minimalist-like repetition to give Mr. Vavrek’s pointed, thoughtful words even more power and emotional specificity."
