= Andrea Carroll (soprano) =

American soprano

Andrea Carroll (born c. 1990) is an American soprano who has had an active international career in concerts and operas since 2012. A finalist in the 2015 Operalia, The World Opera Competition, she is particularly known for her performances with the Houston Grand Opera and the Vienna State Opera.

== Life and career ==
A graduate of Walt Whitman High School and the Manhattan School of Music (MSM), Carroll grew up in Bethesda, Maryland. She performed in several operas while a student at the MSM, including the Wife in Schubert's Die Verschworenen and Despina in Così fan tutte. She also studied voice with Phyllis Curtin and Stephanie Blythe at the Tanglewood Music Center. She then served in the Young Artist Program at the Glimmerglass Opera and for two years as a member of the Young Artist Program at the Houston Grand Opera (HGO) before becoming a resident artist at the Vienna State Opera (VSO). At the VSO she has appeared as Zerlina in Don Giovanni (2015–2016) and the title heroine in Johanna Doderer’s Fatima oder Von den Mutigen Kindern (2015–2016) among other roles.

In 2012 Carroll made debuts with several American companies, including the HGO as Musetta in La boheme, the Fort Worth Opera as Susanna in The Marriage of Figaro, and her debut at the Wolf Trap Opera as Zerlina. She returned to Wolf Trap in 2013 to perform the role of Corrina in Il viaggio a Reims and returned to the HGO to perform the roles of Adele in Die Fledermaus and The Plaintiff in Gilbert and Sullivan's Trial by Jury. That same year she made her debut at the Utah Opera as Rosalba in Florencia en el Amazonas and was a featured soloist in a program of winter and holiday music with the Houston Symphony.

In 2014 Carroll performed four roles at the HGO: Countess Ceprano in Rigoletto, Adele, Anne Engerman in A Little Night Music, and Woglinde in Das Rheingold. Also that year she portrayed Rosalba at the Washington National Opera, Julie Jordan in Carousel at the Glimmerglass Opera, Gilda in Rigoletto at Opera Santa Barbara, and the Princess in Xavier Montsalvatge's El Gato con Botas at the Gotham Chamber Opera. In 2015 she was a finalist in the Operalia, The World Opera Competition, made her debut at the Seattle Opera as Echo in Ariadne auf Naxos, performed Adina in L'elisir d'amore with the Finger Lakes Opera, and returned to the Utah Opera as Leila in Bizet's Les pêcheurs de perles before assuming her post in Vienna.

In 2016 Carroll returned to the Vienna State Opera as Waldvogel in Siegfried, Woglinde in Götterdämmerung, and Papagena in The Magic Flute. Later that year she performed the role of Julie Jordan at the HGO and created the role of Mary Hatch Bailey in the world premiere of Jake Heggie's It's a Wonderful Life.
