= Tracy K. Smith =

American poet (born 1972)

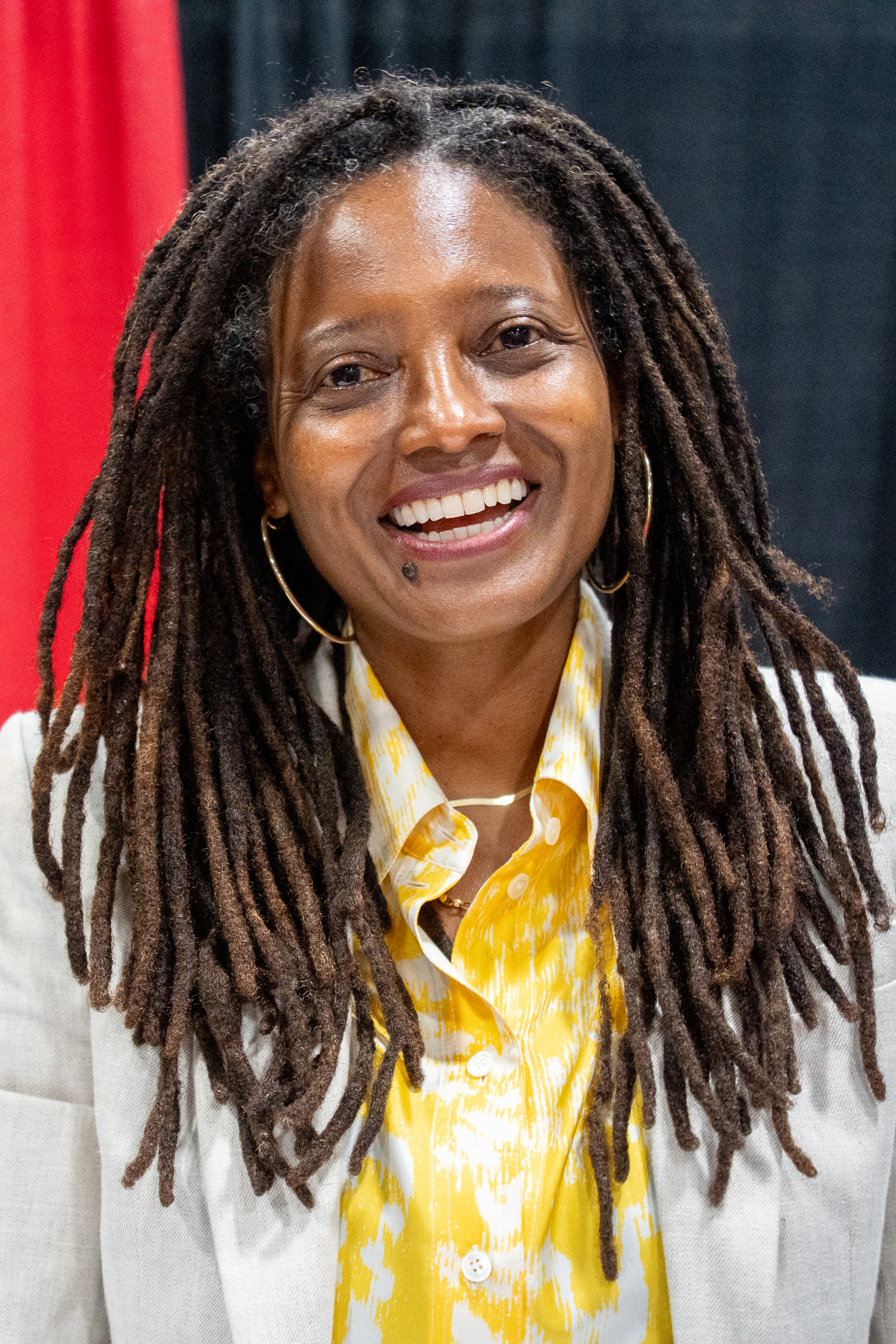
- Smith at National Book Festival 2025
- Born: April 16, 1972 (age 54); Falmouth, Massachusetts, U.S.
- Education: Harvard University (BA); Columbia University (MFA)
- Occupations: Poet, educator
- Title: Boylston Professor of Rhetoric and Oratory
- Awards: Pulitzer Prize for Poetry (2012); James Laughlin Award (2006); Whiting Award (2005); Cave Canem Prize (2002)

United States Poet Laureate
- In office 2017–2019
- Preceded by: Juan Felipe Herrera
- Succeeded by: Joy Harjo
- Website: tracyksmithpoet.com

Tracy K. Smith (born April 16, 1972) is an American poet and educator. She served as the 22nd poet laureate of the United States from 2017 to 2019. She has published five collections of poetry, winning the Pulitzer Prize for Poetry for her 2011 collection Life on Mars. Her memoir, Ordinary Light, was published in 2015.

In April 2018, she was nominated for a second term as United States Poet Laureate by Librarian of Congress Carla Hayden.

In 2023, Smith was elected to the American Philosophical Society.

== Early life ==
Born in Falmouth, Massachusetts, she was raised in Fairfield, California, in a family with "deep roots" in Alabama. Her mother was a teacher and her father an engineer who worked on the Hubble Space Telescope. Her book Life on Mars pays homage to her father's life and work. Smith became interested in writing and poetry early, reading Emily Dickinson and Mark Twain in elementary school; Dickinson's poems, in particular, struck Smith as working like "magic," she wrote in her memoir Ordinary Light, with the rhyme and meter making Dickinson's verses feel almost impossible not to commit to memory. Smith then composed a short poem titled "Humor" and showed it to her fifth-grade teacher, who encouraged her to keep writing. The work of Elizabeth Bishop, Seamus Heaney, Philip Larkin, Yusef Komunyakaa, and Rita Dove also became significant influences.

Smith received her B.A. from Harvard University, where she studied with Helen Vendler, Lucie Brock-Broido, Henri Cole and Seamus Heaney. While in Cambridge, Smith joined the Dark Room Collective. She graduated in 1994, then earned an M.F.A. in Creative Writing from Columbia University in 1997. From 1997 to 1999, she was a Stegner Fellow in poetry at Stanford University.

== Career ==
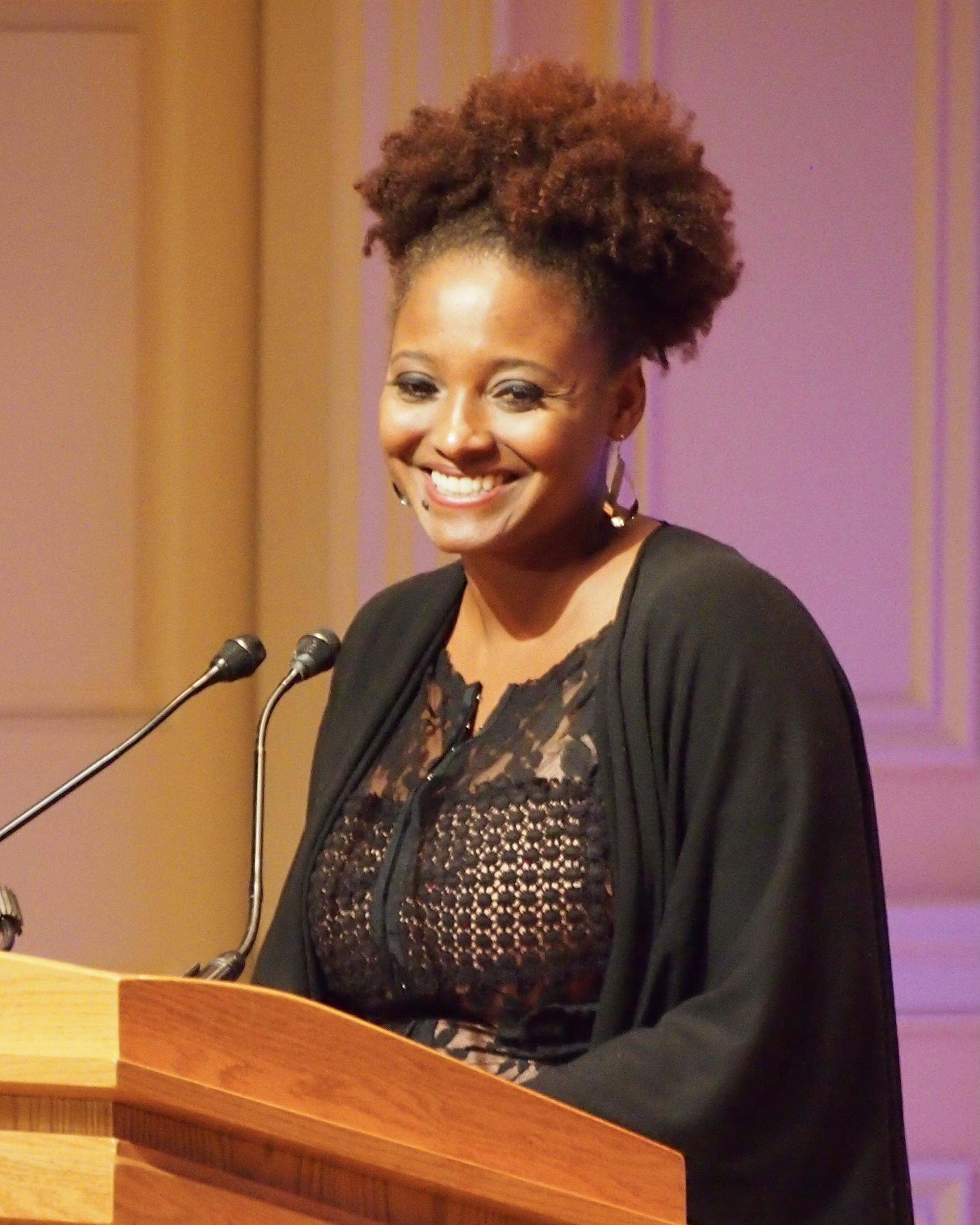
Smith reading at the Library of Congress in 2017

Smith has taught at Medgar Evers College of the City University of New York, the University of Pittsburgh and Columbia University. She taught summer sessions at Bread Loaf School of English at Middlebury College in 2011, 2012, and 2014 and was the 2014 Robert Frost Chair of Literature.

In 2006, she joined the faculty of Princeton University, where she was made a member of Phi Beta Kappa and the Roger S. Berlind '52 Professor in the Humanities. On July 1, 2019, she became Chair of Princeton's Lewis Center for the Arts.

Smith was a judge for the 2016 Griffin Poetry Prize.

From 2018 to 2020, Smith hosted the podcast and radio program The Slowdown.

In 2021, Smith joined the faculty of English and of African and African American Studies at Harvard University. She was the Susan S. and Kenneth L. Wallach Professor at Harvard Radcliffe Institute In 2025, she was named Boylston Professor of Rhetoric and Oratory, succeeding Jorie Graham.

== Critical reception ==
In his review of Life on Mars, Troy Jollimore selects Smith's poem "My god, it's full of stars" as particularly strong, "making use of images from science and science fiction to articulate human desire and grief, as the speaker allows herself to imagine the universe:"

... sealed tight, so nothing escapes. Not even time,
Which should curl in on itself and loop around like smoke.
So that I might be sitting now beside my father
As he raises a lit match to the bowl of his pipe
For the first time in the winter of 1959.

In his review of the collection, Joel Brouwer also quoted at length from this poem, writing that "for Smith the abyss seems as much a space of possibility as of oblivion:"

Perhaps the great error is believing we’re alone,
That the others have come and gone — a momentary blip —
When all along, space might be choc-full of traffic,
Bursting at the seams with energy we neither feel
Nor see, flush against us, living, dying, deciding,
...

Dan Chiasson writes of another aspect of the collection: "The issues of power and paternalism suggest the deep ways in which this is a book about race. Smith’s deadpan title is itself racially freighted: we can’t think about one set of fifties images of Martians and sci-fi comics, without conjuring another, of black kids in the segregated South. Those two image files are situated uncannily close to each other in the cultural cortex, but it took this book to connect them."

About The Body's Question, Lucie Brock-Broido writes: "How delightful it is to fall under the lucid and quite more than lovely spell of Tracy K. Smith's debut collection. Smith's work is deceptively plainspoken, but these are poems that are powerfully wrought, inspiring in all the clarity of their many gospel truths. The Body's Question announces a remarkable new voice, brilliantly bundled, ingeniously belted down."

Yusef Komunyakaa writes: "The Body's Question is an answer to pure passion, but the beauty is that the brain isn't divorced from the body. The strength of character in these marvelous poems delights and questions. Here's a voice that can weave beauty and terror into one breath, and the unguarded revelations are never verbal striptease."

"Tracy Smith speaks many different languages. Besides the Spanish that graces the 'Gospels' of her book's opening section, Smith also seems perfectly at home speaking of grief and loss, of lust and hunger, of joy and desire, which here often means the desire for desire, and a desire for language itself....She seems to speak in tongues, to speak about that thing even beyond language, answering 'The Body's Question' of her title," said Kevin Young.

About Smith's second book, Duende, Elizabeth Alexander writes: "Tracy K. Smith synthesizes the riches of many discursive and poetic traditions without regard to doctrine and with great technical rigor. Her poems are mysterious but utterly lucid and write a history that is sub-rosa yet fully within her vision. They are deeply satisfying and necessarily inconclusive. And they are pristinely beautiful without ever being precious.” (Note: Elizabeth Alexander also writes about Smith’s use of the concept of duende: “Writers and musicians have explored the concept of duende, which might in English translate to a kind of existential blues. Smith is not interested in sadness, per se. Rather, in the strange music of these poems I think Smith is trying to walk us close to the edge of death-in-life, the force of hovering death in both the personal and social realms, admitting its inevitability and sometimes-proximity, and understand its manifestations in quotidian acts. This dark force is nonetheless a life force, which, in the poem 'Flores Woman,' concludes 'Like a dark star. I want to last.' If Duende were wine, it would certainly be red; if edible, it would be meat cooked rare, coffee taken black, stinky cheese, bittersweet chocolate. Tracy K. Smith's music is wholly her own, and Duende is a dolorous, beautiful book.")

Smith has received praise throughout her books for her questions on relationships, identity and sexuality. Hilton Als of The New Yorker writes: "Part of the gorgeous struggle in Smith’s poetry is about how to understand and accept her twin selves: the black girl who was brought up to be a polite Christian and the woman who is willing to give herself over to unbridled sensation and desire."

Her book Ordinary Light: A Memoir, about race, faith and the dawning of her poetic vocation, was a finalist for the National Book Award for Nonfiction in 2015.

Smith is writing the librettos for two operas, one about Jane Jacobs and Robert Moses and their competing visions for New York City (a project with composer Judd Greenstein and video artist Joshua Frankel). The other, Castor and Patience with composer Gregory Spears, about slavery's legacy was premiered in 2022 by Cincinnati Opera.

== Personal life ==
Smith lives in Massachusetts with her husband, Raphael Allison, and their three children. Allison is the author of Bodies on the Line: Performance and the Sixties Poetry Reading (2014). The family previously lived in Boerum Hill, Brooklyn.

== Bibliography ==
=== Poetry collections ===
- The Body's Question. Graywolf Press. 2003. ISBN 9781555973919.
- Duende. Graywolf Press. 2007. ISBN 9781555974756.
- Life on Mars. Graywolf Press. 2011. ISBN 9781555975845.
- Wade in the Water. Graywolf Press. 2018. ISBN 9781555978136.
- Such Color: New and Selected Poems. Graywolf Press. 2021. ISBN 9781644450673.

=== List of poems ===
- "Ash". The New Yorker. Vol. 91, no. 37. November 23, 2015. p. 52.
- "Declaration". The New Yorker. Vol. 93, no. 35. November 6, 2017. pp. 32–33.

==== Anthology contributions ====
- Poems, Poets, Poetry
- Poets on Teaching: A Sourcebook
- State of the Union: 50 Political Poems
- When She Named Fire
- Efforts and Affection: Women Poets on Mentorship
- The McSweeney's Book of Poets Picking Poets
- Legitimate Dangers: American Poets of the New Century
- The Autumn House Anthology of Contemporary American Poetry
- Gathering Ground: A Reader Celebrating Cave Canem's First Decade
- Poetry Daily: 366 Poems from the World's Most Popular Poetry Website
- Poetry 30: Thirty-Something Thirty-Something American Poets
- Hix, H. L., ed. (2008). New Voices: Contemporary Poetry from the United States. Irish Pages. ISBN 9780954425791.
- Warr, Michael, ed. (2016). Of Poetry and Protest: from Emmett Till to Trayvon Martin. W. W. Norton. ISBN 9780393352733.

=== Anthologies (as editor) ===
- American Journal: Fifty Poems for Our Time. Graywolf Press. 2018. ISBN 9781555978150.

=== Translations ===
- Yi Lei (2020). My Name Will Grow Wide like a Tree: Selected Poems. Translated by Smith, Tracy K.; Bi, Changtai. Graywolf Press. ISBN 9781644450406.

=== Non-fiction ===
- Ordinary Light: A Memoir. Knopf. 2015. ISBN 9780307962669.
- To Free the Captives. Knopf. 2023. ISBN 9780593534762.

== Awards and honors ==
=== Honors including grants, fellowships ===
- Grant from the Ludwig Vogelstein Foundation
- Fellowship from the Bread Loaf Writers' Conference
- 1997 Stegner Fellow
- 2004 Rona Jaffe Foundation Writers' Award
- 2010 Rolex Mentor and Protégé Arts Initiative. Hans Magnus Enzensberger became Smith's mentor for one year; their experience working together was described in an article by Philip Dodd.
- 2014 Academy Fellowship given by the Academy of American Poets for distinguished poetic achievement.
- 2016 Robert Creeley Award
- 2016 University Medal for Excellence from Columbia University
- 2017 Poet Laureate of the United States
- 2018 American Ingenuity Award for Education
- 2022 Golden Plate Award of the American Academy of Achievement
- 2023 American Philosophical Society induction
- 2024 Guggenheim Fellowship

=== Literary wins and nominations ===
- 2002 Cave Canem Prize for The Body's Question. Smith's book was chosen by Kevin Young.
- 2005 Whiting Award for poetry
- 2006 James Laughlin Award for Duende
- 2008 Essence magazine's Literary Award for Duende.
- 2012 Pulitzer Prize for Poetry for Life on Mars (Graywolf Press), "a collection of bold, skillful poems, taking readers into the universe and moving them to an authentic mix of joy and pain."
- 2015 National Book Award for Nonfiction shortlisted for Ordinary Light
