= New York International Piano Competition =

The New York International Piano Competition (NYIPC) in New York City is a biennial piano competition open to pianists of all nationalities ages 16–21. No contestant is eliminated during the competition's four rounds. A cash award is also presented to each of the contestants not receiving a major prize. The NYIPC has been held at the Manhattan School of Music since its inception in 2002, with opening ceremonies at Steinway Hall. Steinway and Sons is the official piano of the competition.

Rather than a traditional competition model where the focus is on winning, the NYIPC provides an opportunity for contestants to perform, network, exchange information, and cultivate a support system that will sustain them through their pre-professional years. Former NYIPC prizewinners perform with Chamber Music Society Two; have received the Avery Fisher Career Grant; the Gilmore Young Artist Award; The Juilliard School's William Petschek Recital Award; the Louis Sudler Prize in the Arts at Harvard University; have won the Young Concert Artists Auditions, and Concert Artists Guild Victor Elmaleh Competition; and maintain active careers as solo performers, collaborative pianists, composers, and pedagogues.

== History ==
Sponsored by the Stecher and Horowitz Foundation, the competition was instituted in 2002 as an outgrowth of the Stecher and Horowitz School of the Arts in Cedarhurst, New York. The competition was originally open to American pianists, citizen-born, naturalized or full-time international students with student visas, ages 14–18. In 2009, the competition began to accept applications worldwide, effective the summer of 2010; it also expanded its age category upwards from 14–18 years to 16–21 years.

== Prizes ==
The current NYIPC prizes, totaling $50,000, are:

- First Prize: $10,000
- Second Prize: $6,000
- Third Prize: $3,000
- Fourth Prize: $2,000
- Ensemble Prizes: $6,000
- Best performance of commissioned work: $1,500

$1,000 is awarded to each of the remaining contestants.

== The Young Artist Series ==
Winners of the NYIPC are awarded concert and recital appearances through the Stecher and Horowitz Foundation's Young Artists Series. They regularly appear at venues in New York, Connecticut, and Washington, D.C. including: Congregation Emanu-El of New York, NYC; Park Avenue Christian Church, NYC; The Bohemians, NYC; Salmagundi Club, NYC; Subculture Arts Underground, NYC; Downtown Music at Grace, White Plains, NY; Ossining Public Library, Ossining, NY; Canisius College, Buffalo, NY; Fairfield University, Fairfield, CT; Phillips Collection, Washington, D.C.; Church of the Annunciation, Washington, D.C.

== Works Commissioned for the NYIPC ==
Since 2006, the Stecher and Horowitz Foundation has commissioned a new solo piano work for each competition. All contestants are required to perform the piece from memory as part of their Preliminary or Semifinal round.

Commissioned composers have included:
2006 - Michael Torke, Bays of Huatulco (renamed Blue Pacific)
2008 - John Musto, Improvisation and Fugue
2010 - No work commissioned
2012 - Avner Dorman, Three Etudes
2014 - Gabriela Lena Frank, Nocturno Nazqueño
2016 - Lowell Liebermann, Two Impromptus
2018 - Gregory Spears, Toccata (Troika)

== Laureates ==
Year	First prize	Second prize	Third prize	Fourth prize	Ensemble first prize	Ensemble second prize	Best performance of required contemporary work
2002	Di Zhu	Jonathan Coombs	Esther Park	Jonathan Ware	Soo Yeon Cho and Jonathan Coombs	Esther Park and Di Zhu	
2004	Hannah Sun	Brandon Lee	Natalia Kazaryan	Matthew Graybil	Michael Brown and Min Hwan Kim	Dae Hyung Ahn and Emily Phelps	
2006	Charlie Albright	Larry Weng	Alexei Tartakovski	Joshua Wright	Charlie Albright and Larry Weng	Sun-A Park and Sidney Zaleski	
2008	Allen Yueh	Vivian Cheng	Patricio Molina	Michael Stewart	Emiko Edwards and Xiaopei Xu	Vivian Cheng and T.J. Tario	Eva Belmont
2010	Kate Liu	Yen Yu Chen	Jung Eun Kim	Jung-Yeon Yim	Anna Dmytrenko and Jung Eun Kim	Fan-Ya Lin and Chelsea Wang	Kate Liu
2012	Anna Han	Chelsea Wang	Anna Dmytrenko	Sahun Hong	Katharina Gross and Sahun Hong	Hugo Kitano and Yilan Zhao	Mackenzie Alan Melemed
2014	Jun Hwi Cho	Daniel Kim	Yilin Liu	Seol-Hwa Kim	Max Ma and Thomas Steigerwald	Ling-Yu Lee and NingYuen Li	Daniel Kim
2016	Aristo Sham	Angie Zhang	Jiacheng Xiong	Evelyn Mo	Prudence Poon and Jooyeon Ka	Zhiye Lin and Aaron Kurz	Aristo Sham
2018	Youlan Ji	Zoie Shuk Yi Tse	Nejc Kamplet	Yilun Xu	Michael Davidman and Kimberly Han	tie: Yilun Xu and Nejc Kamplet; Eric Lin and Carter Johnson	Yiying Niu
2020	Cancelled due to the COVID-19 pandemic						
