= Javier Arau =

American musician

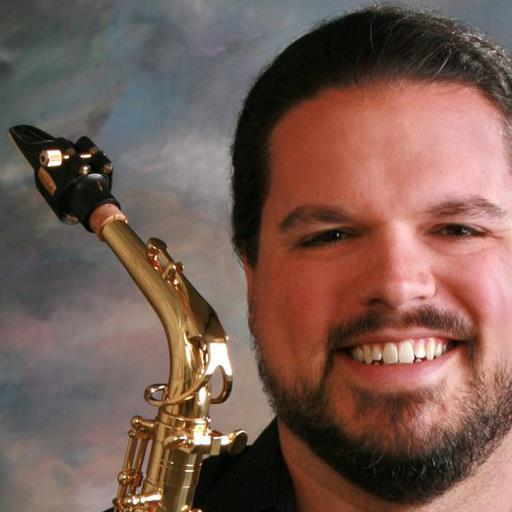
- Born: September 30, 1975 (age 51)
- Occupations: Musician, Composer, Conductor, Theorist, Author, and Entrepreneur

Javier Arau (September 30, 1975) is an American composer, saxophonist, conductor, theorist, author, and entrepreneur. He is the founder and executive director of New York Jazz Academy, leads the Javier Arau Jazz Orchestra, and is the author of several works on music theory and improvisation. He is a four-time Downbeat Award winner.

== Biography ==
Javier Arau was born in Santa Monica, California and raised in Sacramento, California. He received scholarships to attend Lawrence University in 1993 and New England Conservatory in 1998.

He received an Outstanding Performance Award in 1994, Extended Jazz Composition awards in 1996 and 2000, and a Jazz Arranging award in 2000 from DownBeat Magazine. He also was the first-ever recipient of the ASCAP Young Jazz Composers Award, in 2002.

He has been featured in the New York Times, DownBeat Magazine, on NBC TV's Today in New York, and was the featured cover artist on the Saxophone Journal in August 2009. All About Jazz hailed, "Arau's 'Paper Train' is a marvelous bit of modern composition. Arau's 'Missouri Blues' toys with the edges of funk and fusion, and he puts grit into his tone to match. ...Good music based on strong roots.". Saxophone Journal noted, "Those who we remember best--Bach, Telemann, Vivaldi, Haydn and Mozart--did it all. Today there are very few who do it all, and an incredibly small proportion of them do it all extremely well. One who does is Javier Arau."

In 2009, he founded New York Jazz Academy, a NYC-based music school. He also leads the Javier Arau Jazz Orchestra.

== Publications ==
Javier's compositions have received awards from ASCAP, BMI, DownBeat Magazine, and IAJE, and are published by UNC Jazz Press and Dorn Publications. At the age of 19, his transcription and analysis of Joe Henderson's Grammy award-winning solo on Lush Life was published in IAJE's Jazz Educators Journal, which became widely regarded as the definitive transcription of that iconic performance. Henderson got word of Javier's efforts and quickly became a mentor to him. Arau has published his "Augmented Scale Theory," which helps bridge the gap between the chromatic tendencies of modern jazz and the diatonic roots of traditional jazz harmony, enabling the improviser to play creatively over such challenging material as Coltrane's “Giant Steps” and Wayne Shorter classics. His most recent book, a practice manual for all instruments, "365 Ways of Practicing Major Scales in Thirds" is available in bookstores nationwide. Javier is currently writing a book entitled "Anatomy Of A Melody: A Jazz Improv Primer for All Instruments". Javier's Jelly and Jam Session, his extensive music outreach program, was licensed by the NYC Department of Education to be used in the public school music curriculum.
