= Canticum Novum =

South African church choir

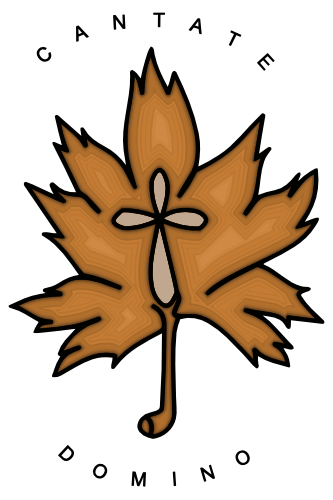
- Official Emblem of Canticum Novum

Background information
- Also known as: Stellenbosch Central Church Choir, Stellenbosch Student Church Choir
- Origin: Stellenbosch, South Africa
- Genres: Sacred, choral
- Years active: 1959–present
- Website: www.canticumnovum.org.za

Canticum Novum is the church choir of the Stellenbosch Dutch Reformed Church (Moederkerk). The choir exists as a society of the University of Stellenbosch and is the only choir in South Africa connected to a university singing only sacred music.

== History ==
The activities of Canticum Novum are the continuance of a well-founded choir tradition that came about more than a century ago within the Stellenbosch Dutch Reformed Church. This tradition includes notable South African figures in choral music such as Gawie Cillié, Chris Swanepoel, Pieter van der Westhuizen and Anton Els. When the Stellenbosch Central Church separated from the Stellenbosch Church (Moederkerk) in 1959, Chris Swanepoel extended this tradition when he established a choir that consisted mainly of students. Out of this congregation the Stellenbosch Student Church later formed.

Pieter van der Westhuizen succeeded Swanepoel in 1965 as conductor and organist. He held this position for 25 years – until 1990. Anton Els became the new conductor and in the 5 years that he held the position, the choir underwent its first name change – from the Stellenbosch Central Church Choir to the Stellenbosch Student Church Choir.

As of 1996 Louis van der Watt is associated with the choir and the congregation as conductor and organist. In 2000 the name changed again, becoming Canticum Novum. Due to a remerging of the two churches in 2007, the Stellenbosch Student Church is presently part of Moederkerk, and as such Canticum Novum is once more its official choir, celebrating its 50th anniversary in 2009.

Canticum Novum is the only choir in South Africa that only sings sacred music while at the same time consisting mainly of students and young adults. Apart from being the Moederkerk Choir, Canticum Novum is also a stage choir that has a wide repertoire with works ranging from Bruckner, Rachmaninoff and Monteverdi to Negro Spirituals. Every year the choir also performs in one or more concerts with an orchestra including works by Händel, Mozart, Rossini, Bach and Schubert, to name but a few.

In 2018, Yolanda Botha took over as conductor.

== Name and motto ==
Cantate Domino canticum novum! Sing to the Lord a new song!

The name Canticum Novum means "New Song" and is derived from Psalm 96:1, which starts with the words Cantate Domino canticum novum (Sing to the Lord a new song). Cantate Domino (Sing to the Lord) is then also the motto of the choir.

== Emblem ==
The core consists of a Plane leaf, symbolic of steadfastness, with the primary vein typifying a cross. The nine points of the leaf represents, in this order, the supporters of the members as the uppermost leaflet, and the eight voice parts as the remaining leaflets. The leafstalk is turned clockwise, signifying advancement.

== Repertoire ==
The choir is one of the few choirs in South Africa to sing only sacred music, but nevertheless holds regular public performances. It has become a tradition that, with the start of each year, the choir will practice and perform a mass or similar work with the University Stellenbosch Symphony Orchestra. The following works have been performed:

- 2013 – Schubert Mass in A flat major D678
- 2012 – Handel Messiah
- 2011 – Vivaldi Magnificat, Handel Dettingen Anthem, Schubert Mass in G Major D167, Mozart Te Deum
- 2010 – Mozart Requiem
- 2009 – Handel Messiah
- 2008 – Vivaldi Magnificat & Credo and Handel Dixit Dominus
- 2007 – Vivaldi Gloria and Handel Dettingen Te Deum
- 2006 – Mozart Requiem
- 2005 – Handel Messiah
- 2004 – Handel Coronation Anthems
- 2003 – Mozart Credo Mass in C Major, K.257, and Schubert Credo Mass in F Major, D105
- 2002 – Mozart Requiem
- 2001 – Bach Magnificat, Handel Dettingen Te Deum and Rossini's Stabat Mater
- 2000 – Handel Messiah and Fauré Requiem
- 1999 – Handel Dixit Dominus and Vivaldi Gloria
- 1998 – Mozart Requiem
