= Stecher and Horowitz Foundation =

The Stecher and Horowitz Foundation is a 501(c)(3) non-profit organization in New York City founded by Melvin Stecher and Norman Horowitz, duo-pianists, music educators, composers, and educational consultants. Founded in 1975, the Foundation was an outgrowth of The Stecher and Horowitz School of the Arts in Cedarhurst, New York, where Messrs. Stecher and Horowitz served as directors for 39 years (1960–1999).

The Foundation provides mentorship, career guidance, artistic development, and performance opportunities for young pianists through the New York International Piano Competition (NYIPC) and the Young Artists Series. Instituted in 2002, NYIPC was originally open to American pianists, citizen-born, naturalized or full-time international students with student visas, ages 14–18. In 2009, the competition began to accept applications worldwide, effective the summer of 2010; it also expanded its age category upwards from 14–18 years to 16–21 years. Winners of the NYIPC are awarded concert and recital appearances in the Foundation's Young Artists Series, which includes performance venues in New York, Connecticut, and Washington, D.C.

== Documentary films ==
The Stecher and Horowitz Foundation, in association director Lucy Bruell, has produced three documentary films about NYIPC, which give a glimpse into the motivations and aspirations of the competitors and their families.

Speaking with Music (2002) is a one-hour documentary about a group of young pianists and how they express themselves emotionally and intellectually through their art. The film also presents a portrait of Melvin Stecher and Norman Horowitz, the duo pianist team who created the competition, contrasting what it was like for them as young performers in the 1950s with the challenges young pianists face today.

Beyond the Practice Room (2004) explores what motivates young pianists to perform and to take risks on stage, to experiment as artists. Parental influence, passion for music, dreams and expectations are among the many themes that are explored in this intimate, behind-the-scenes portrait of the contestants at the New York Piano Competition.

On a Personal Note (2008) explores the relationship between young classical pianists and their art, particularly how the personality and personal interpretation of each artist color a work of classical music.
