= Joel Brouwer =

American poet, professor and critic (born 1968)

- Born: 1968 (age 57–58); Grand Rapids, Michigan, U.S.
- Occupation: Poet

Academic background
- Education: Syracuse University; Sarah Lawrence College

Joel Brouwer (born 1968) is an American poet, professor and critic.

He is also the author of Exactly What Happened, which received the Larry Levis Prize from Virginia Commonwealth University, and Centuries, a National Book Critics Circle Notable Book.

Brouwer's essays, book reviews and poems have been published in The New York Times Book Review, Boston Review, Harvard Review, The Progressive, AGNI, Parnassus, The Cortland Review, Crab Orchard Review, Crazyhorse, The Georgia Review, The Gettysburg Review, The Iowa Review, The Massachusetts Review, The Paris Review, Pleiades, Ploughshares, Poetry, The Prose Poem, Tin House, The Washington Post

Brouwer was born in Grand Rapids, Michigan, in 1968, is a graduate of Sarah Lawrence College and Syracuse University, is a professor of English at the University of Alabama, and lives in Tuscaloosa and New Orleans.

== Awards ==
- Wisconsin Institute for Creative Writing Fellowship
- 1999 National Endowment for the Arts Fellowship
- 2001 Whiting Award
- 2010 Guggenheim Fellowship

== Published works ==
=== Poetry collections ===
- Exactly What Happened (Purdue University Press, 1999)
- Centuries (New York: Four Way Books, 2003)
- And So (New York: Four Way Books, 2009)
- Off Message (New York: Four Way Books, 2016)
- As Long as We're Here (New York: Four Way Books, 2026)

=== Chapbooks ===
- This Just In (Los Angeles: Beyond Baroque Books, 1998)
- Think of It This Way (Tuscaloosa: Fameorshame Press, 2000)
- Lt. Shrapnel (New York: Artichoke Yink Press, 2002)
- Snow (New York: Salamandra Editions, 2008)
- Flag Factory (New York: Artichoke Yink Press, 2008)
- Hybrid Land (Tuscaloosa: Filter Press, 2011)
