= Opera Fusion: New Works =

- Opera Fusion: New Works official logo
- Formation: 2011
- Type: Collaboration between Cincinnati Opera and University of Cincinnati College-Conservatory of Music
- Location: Cincinnati, Ohio
- Region served: United States, Ohio, Cincinnati
- Co-Artistic Directors: Evans Mirageas and Robin Guarino
- Parent organization: Cincinnati Opera and University of Cincinnati College-Conservatory of Music
- Website: http://ofnw.org

Opera Fusion: New Works (OF:NW) is a partnership between Cincinnati Opera and the University of Cincinnati College-Conservatory of Music (CCM) dedicated to fostering the development of new American operas. This collaboration is jointly led by Evans Mirageas, the Harry T. Wilks Artistic Director at Cincinnati Opera, as well as Robin Guarino, Professor of Opera at CCM. Since its founding in 2011, OF:NW has developed twenty-eight new American operas. From the program's inception in 2011 through 2022, co-founders Marcus Küchle and Guarino served as co-artistic directors.

== Process ==
OF:NW provides a 10-day residency for composers and composer/librettist teams seeking to workshop their operas. Team members may use the resources (facilities, artists, and faculty) of both Cincinnati Opera and the University of Cincinnati College-Conservatory of Music (CCM) in this workshop process. At the end of the workshop, students from CCM and professional artists from Cincinnati Opera perform excerpts from the piece at a free, public concert, followed by a Q&A session with the audience.

== Projects ==
Since its founding in 2011, Opera Fusion: New Works has fostered the development of twenty-eight new American operas.

=== O'Keeffe: Kiss The Sky (2026) ===
O'Keeffe: Kiss The Sky, composed by Christopher Tin and libretto by Kelley Rourke, participated in OF:NW in 2026.

=== Sleepers Awake (2026) ===
Sleepers Awake, composed by Gregory Spears and directed by Jenny Koons, participated in OF:NW in 2025.

=== John Lewis: Good Trouble (2026) ===
John Lewis: Good Trouble, composed by Maria Thompson Corley and libretto by Diana Solomon-Glover, participated in OF:NW in 2025.

=== The Post Office (2025) ===
The Post Office, composed by Laura Kaminsky and libretto by Elaine Sexton, participated in OF:NW in 2025.

=== Hildegard (2025) ===
Hildegard, composed and libretto by Sarah Kirkland Snider, participated in OF:NW in 2024.

=== Lalovavi (2025) ===
Lalovavi, composed by Kevin Day with a libretto by Tifara Brown, participated in OF:NW in 2024.

=== The Highlands (TBD) ===
The Highlands, composed by Carlos Simon with a libretto by Lynn Nottage and Ruby Aiyo Gerber, participated in OF:NW in 2024.

=== Two Corners (2025) ===
Two Corners, composed by Brittney Boykin with a libretto by Jarrod Lee, participated in OF:NW in 2023.

=== Lincoln in the Bardo (2025) ===
Lincoln in the Bardo, composed by Missy Mazzoli with a libretto by Royce Vavrek, participated in OF:NW in 2023.

=== The Righteous (2024) ===
The Righteous, composed by Gregory Spears with a libretto by Tracy K. Smith, participated in OF:NW in 2023.

=== Robeson (2023) ===
Robeson, composed by Scott Davenport Richards with a libretto by David Cote, participated in OF:NW in 2022.

=== Bulrusher (2022) ===
Bulrusher, composed by Nathaniel Stookey with a libretto by Eisa Davis, participated in OF:NW in 2021.

=== The Hours (2022) ===
The Hours, composed by Kevin Puts with a libretto by Greg Pierce, participated in OF:NW in 2021.

=== Awakenings (2020) ===
Awakenings, composed by Tobias Picker with a libretto by Aryeh Lev Stollman, participated in OF:NW in 2019.

=== Castor and Patience (2020) ===
Castor and Patience, composed by Gregory Spears with a libretto by Tracy K. Smith, participated in OF:NW in 2019.

=== Postville: Hometown to the World (2020) ===
Postville: Hometown to the World, composed by Laura Kaminsky with a libretto by Kimberly Reed, participated in OF:NW in 2018.

=== Eurydice (2020) ===
Eurydice, composed by Matthew Aucoin with a libretto by Sarah Ruhl, was the 2018 opera workshopped by OF:NW. The opera is based on the legend of Orpheus and Eurydice.

=== Blind Injustice (2019) ===
Blind Injustice, composed by Scott Davenport Richards with a libretto by David Cote, was workshopped by OF:NW in 2019.

=== Hadrian (2018) ===
Hadrian, composed by Rufus Wainwright with a libretto by Daniel MacIvor, was the 2018 opera workshopped by OF:NW. The opera is based on the story of Hadrian, the Roman emperor, and focuses on his relationship with Antinous, a young man.

=== Intimate Apparel (2016) ===
Intimate Apparel, composed by Ricky Ian Gordon with a libretto by Pulitzer Prize-winning playwright Lynn Nottage, was workshopped by OF:NW in 2016. The opera is based on Nottage's play by the same title, and surrounds the life of Esther, an African-American woman who moves to New York City in 1905 to become a seamstress. The piece participated in the Metropolitan Opera/Lincoln Center Theater's New Works program in 2017.

=== Some Light Emerges (2016) ===
Some Light Emerges, composed by Laura Kaminsky with a libretto by Mark Campbell and Kimberly Reed, participated in OF:NW in 2016. The opera surrounds the design and creation of the Rothko Chapel in Houston, and the lives of five characters as they enter the chapel over the course of four decades. The piece premiered in 2017 at Houston Grand Opera.

=== Shalimar the Clown (2015) ===
Shalimar the Clown, based on the 2005 novel by Salman Rushdie, was composed by Jack Perla with a libretto by Rajiv Joseph, and brought to OF:NW in 2015. The libretto tells a love story set in a rural Kashmiri village. When an American ambassador arrives, the love is torn apart, and the titular character seeks revenge. The piece premiered in 2016 at the Opera Theatre of Saint Louis.

=== Morning Star (2015) ===
Morning Star by composer Ricky Ian Gordon and librettist William M. Hoffman participated in OF:NW in 2012. The story follows a Jewish mother who immigrates to New York City, hoping to achieve the American Dream. In 2015, the piece premiered with Cincinnati Opera at Cincinnati Music Hall.

=== Meet John Doe (2015) ===
Meet John Doe by Mexico-born composer Daniel Catán remained unfinished after his death in 2011. The creative team responsible for finishing the work came to OF:NW, where it was then completed in 2015.

=== Great Scott (2014) ===
Great Scott, by composer Jake Heggie and librettist Terrence McNally, participated in OF:NW in 2014. This comedy surrounds an opera star who returns to save her struggling local opera company by appearing in an unknown bel canto opera, which is scheduled for the same night as the Super Bowl—in which the home team is playing. The piece was premiered at Dallas Opera in 2015, and was performed again by San Diego Opera in 2016.

=== Fellow Travelers (2013) ===
After a workshop with OF:NW, the opera Fellow Travelers, by composer Gregory Spears and librettist Greg Pierce, premiered at Cincinnati Opera in June 2016, and will be performed by the Lyric Opera of Chicago in 2018. It is set during the McCarthy era of the 1950s and focuses on the "lavender scare", a witch hunt and mass firings of gay people from the United States government. The story centers on the love affair between two men working for the federal government—Hawkins "Hawk" Fuller, a State Department official, and Timothy Laughlin, a recent college graduate working in a senator's office.

=== Champion (2013) ===
Champion, with music by jazz composer Terence Blanchard and a libretto by Michael Cristofer, participated in OF:NW in 2012. Since then, it's been performed at the Loretto-Hilton Center for the Performing Arts at Webster University in 2013, Opera Parallèle in San Francisco in 2016, and the Washington National Opera in 2017. It surrounds the life of Emile Griffith, a gay welterweight boxer in the 1960s, and his rivalry with Benny Paret, a fellow boxer who taunted his sexuality during a match, leading to a tragic outcome.

=== Doubt (2013) ===
Doubt, composed by Douglas J. Cuomo with libretto by John Patrick Shanley, came to OF:NW in 2011, and was the first piece to participate in the workshop. The story is based on Shanley's Pulitzer Prize-winning play Doubt: A Parable, which surrounds Church politics and race-based abuse in a Catholic school in 1964. The piece premiered at Minnesota Opera in 2013.
