= Cincinnati Opera =

American opera company

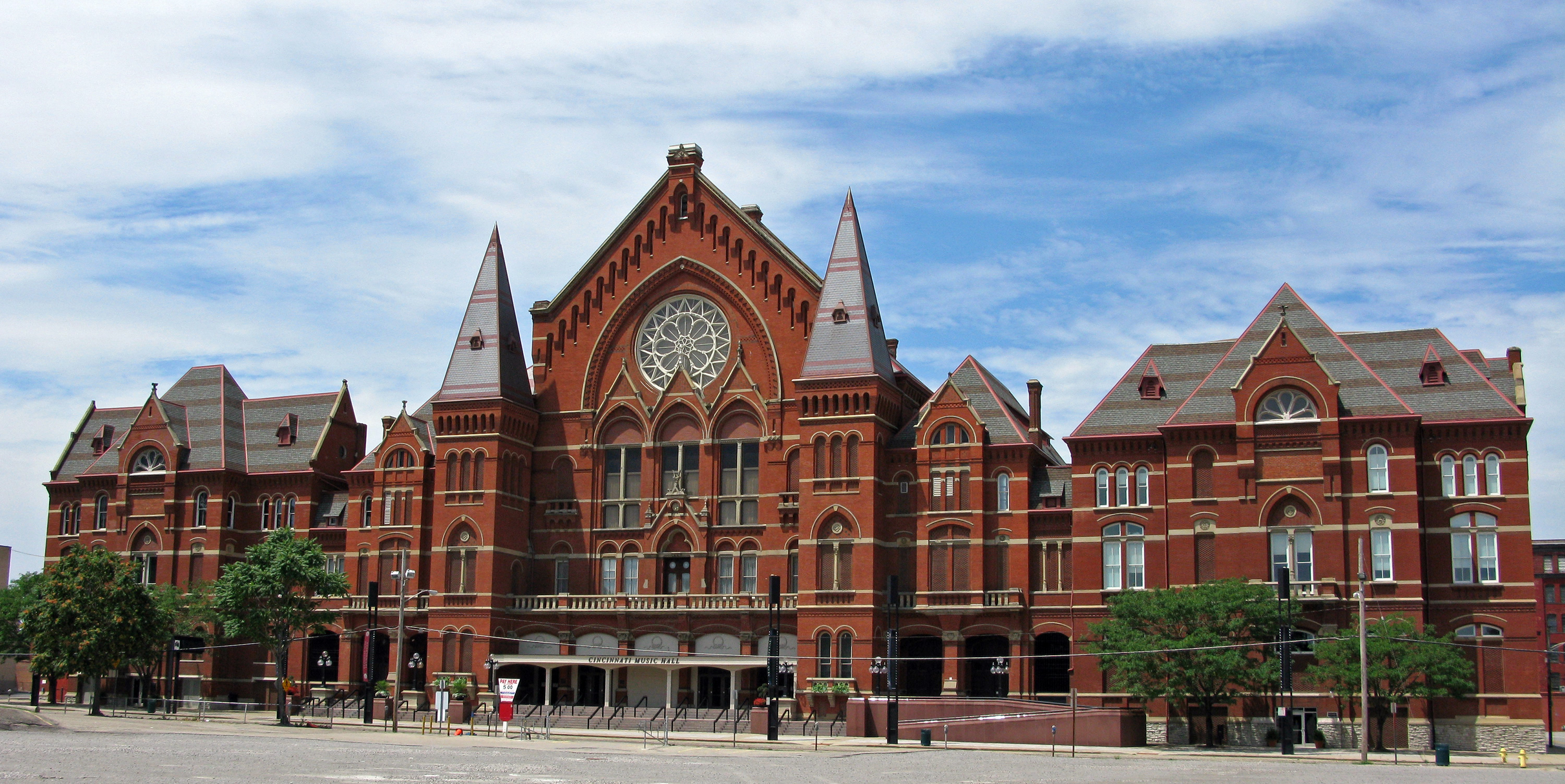
- Cincinnati Music Hall, the home of Cincinnati Opera
- Formerly: Cincinnati Opera Association
- Type: Opera company
- Headquarters: Cincinnati, Ohio, United States
- Revenue: 7,337,052 United States dollar (2017)
- Total assets: 38,670,094 United States dollar (2022)
- Website: www.cincinnatiopera.org

Cincinnati Opera is an American opera company based in Cincinnati, Ohio and the second-oldest opera company in the United States, after the New York Metropolitan Opera. Beginning with its first season in 1920, Cincinnati Opera has produced operas in the summer months of June and July with the Cincinnati Symphony Orchestra providing orchestral accompaniment.

== History ==
The company, originally named Cincinnati Opera Association, gave its first performance, Flotow's Martha, on Sunday, June 27, 1920. During its early years, the company was under the direction of Ralph Lyford, an American composer and conductor whose single opera Castle Agrazant would receive its world premiere at Cincinnati Music Hall on April 29, 1926, following Lyford's departure from Cincinnati Opera in 1925. From 1956 to 1990, the company ran a singing competition known as the American Opera Auditions.

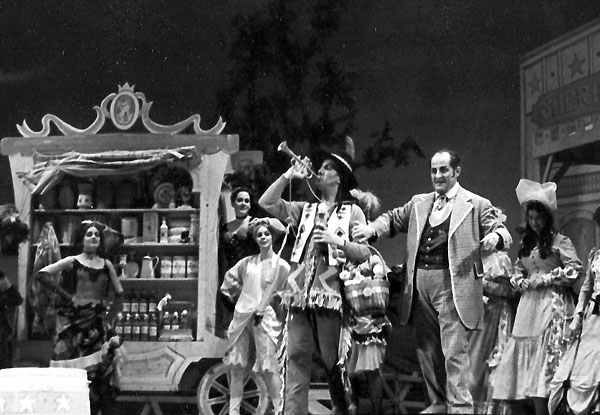
Andrew Foldi as Dr. Dulcamara and Bruce Cooper as his assistant Cochise in Act 1, Scene 2 of Cincinnati Opera's 1968 "Wild West" production of L'elisir d'amore directed by James de Blasis.

For most of its first fifty years, Cincinnati Opera's performances were held at the Cincinnati Zoo Pavilion. During that time, many prominent singers appeared in the company's productions including Plácido Domingo, Beverly Sills, Norman Treigle, Sherrill Milnes, Montserrat Caballé, Jan Peerce, Robert Merrill, Roberta Peters, Shirley Verrett, Lawrence Tibbett, Richard Tucker, Martina Arroyo, James Morris, Elinor Ross and Barbara Daniels. In 1972, Cincinnati Opera moved its performance base to Cincinnati Music Hall, a 3,417-seat theater listed as a National Historic Landmark by the U.S. Department of the Interior. In its 2016 and 2017 seasons, while Music Hall was being restored and renovated, Cincinnati Opera performed throughout the Aronoff Center for the Arts instead. The Opera returned to Cincinnati Music Hall for its 2018 season, and has performed there since.

=== The company under James de Blasis ===
James de Blasis became the company's resident stage director in 1968. He then served as its general director from 1973 to 1987. In 1988 he became its artistic director, a post which he held until 1996.

Under his tenure, the company produced rare operas such as Franco Alfano's Risurrezione in 1983 and Weinberger's Schwanda the Bagpiper in 1986. It also added musicals to its repertory in an effort to broaden its audience base. One of the highlights of the de Blasis era was a new interpretation of Donizetti's L'elisir d'amore which changed the setting from the Basque region of Spain in the 1820s to the "Wild West" of late 19th century Texas. The production was filmed by PBS and nationally televised in 1968.

=== The company under Nicholas Muni ===
In 1996, the internationally known stage director Nicholas Muni succeeded James de Blasis as artistic director of the company. Under his leadership Cincinnati Opera further enlarged its repertory with many company premieres outside the standard repertory including Janáček's Jenůfa, Britten's The Turn of the Screw, Debussy's Pelléas et Mélisande, Bartók's Bluebeard's Castle, Schoenberg's Erwartung, Heggie's Dead Man Walking, Strauss's Elektra, Poulenc's La Voix Humaine, Weill's The Seven Deadly Sins, Ullmann's The Emperor of Atlantis, and the U.S. premiere of Peter Bengtson's The Maids. The company also performed its first mainstage commission, Richard Danielpour's Margaret Garner (co-commissioned with Michigan Opera Theatre and Opera Company of Philadelphia). The Cincinnati performances coincided with the opening of Cincinnati's National Underground Railroad Freedom Center and starred Denyce Graves in the title role.

=== The company under Evans Mirageas ===
In 2006, Evans Mirageas, an influential casting director and former head of Decca's Artists & Repertoire division, became Cincinnati Opera's new artistic director. Following his first season with the company, Opera News magazine listed him as one of the "25 Most Powerful Names in U.S. Opera."

The 2008 Summer Festival, the first to be fully programmed by Mirageas, included the French version of Donizetti's Lucia di Lammermoor plus the company premiere of Daniel Catán's Florencia en el Amazonas. The company's 2009 season featured four operas set in Spain: Le Nozze di Figaro, Don Carlo, Carmen, and the regional premiere of Osvaldo Golijov's Ainadamar. The 2010 season presented a 90th Anniversary Gala Concert, featuring, among others, guest hosts Ryan Seacrest and Sherrill Milnes and singers Maria Luigia Borsi, Angela Brown, Christine Brewer, Denyce Graves, and Richard Leech. Following in 2011 was John Adams's A Flowering Tree, while the 2012 season offered the company's first performances of The Gershwins' Porgy and Bess and Piazzolla's María de Buenos Aires.

In 2012, Mirageas announced an expansion of the company's season to "festival" format featuring grand opera performances in Music Hall; lectures, films, and recitals in Memorial Hall; outdoor concerts in Washington Park; and small-scale productions in the 750-seat Corbett Theater at the School for Creative and Performing Arts.

Performances in the Corbett Theater have included Philip Glass's Galileo Galilei (2013) and Francesco Cavalli's 1651 opera La Calisto (2014), and the world premiere of Ricky Ian Gordon and William M. Hoffman's Morning Star.

=== Recent Seasons ===
While Cincinnati Music Hall was closed for an extensive renovation, Cincinnati Opera's performances took place at the Aronoff Center for the Arts. The company's 2016 season featured the world premiere of Fellow Travelers by composer Gregory Spears and librettist Greg Pierce and a new production of Tosca by Robert Perdziola. Its 2017 season consisted of La Bohème, a company premiere of Frida by Robert Xavier Rodríguez, a silent film-styled The Magic Flute from director Barrie Kosky and 1927, and a production of Missy Mazzoli's new opera Song from the Uproar.

Cincinnati Opera moved back to Cincinnati Music Hall for its 2018 season, and performed Verdi's La Traviata, a new production of Wagner's The Flying Dutchman, the U.S. premiere of Another Brick in the Wall: The Opera, a new production of Monteverdi's L'incoronazione di Poppea, and a company premiere of Laura Kaminsky's As One, a coming-of-age opera about a transgender woman. In 2019, the company presented the world premiere of Scott Davenport Richards and David Cote's Blind Injustice, based on the book of the same name by Ohio Innocence Project director Mark A. Godsey chronicling the true stories of six people who were wrongfully convicted of crimes and eventually exonerated. That season also included The Marriage of Figaro, Romeo and Juliet, a new production of Ariadne auf Naxos, and The Gershwins' Porgy and Bess.

After Patricia Beggs announced her retirement, Christopher Milligan was appointed general director and CEO in March 2020. Shortly thereafter, the company canceled its 100th-anniversary season due to the COVID-19 pandemic. In its stead, Cincinnati Opera launched several creative endeavors to bring opera to the community, including performances online and outdoors; "Cincinnati Opera at 100," a public television documentary; and Cincinnati Opera: A Centennial Celebration, a book chronicling the company's history.

Cincinnati Opera presented an all-outdoor 2021 season at Summit Park in Blue Ash, Ohio, known as “Summer at Summit,” where world-class artists performed on a specially built stage before an audience seated in socially distanced pods. That summer, the company was also inducted into the American Classical Music Hall of Fame.

The company was able to return to indoor performances in 2022, and that season featured two world premieres: Fierce, with music by William Menefield and libretto by Sheila Williams, and Castor and Patience, with music by Gregory Spears and libretto by former U.S. poet laureate Tracy K. Smith. Recent programmatic highlights include the world stage premiere of The Knock (2022) by Aleksandra Vrebalov and Deborah Brevoort, a new production of Madame Butterfly (2023) created by an all-Asian and Asian American creative team led by stage director Matthew Ozawa, and the world stage premiere of Paul McCartney's Liverpool Oratorio (2024).

== Opera Fusion: New Works ==
Opera Fusion: New Works (OF:NW) was developed in 2011 as a collaborative partnership between Cincinnati Opera and the University of Cincinnati College-Conservatory of Music (CCM). The organization is dedicated to fostering the development of new American operas, and has developed nine pieces to date through a rigorous residency and workshop process. This collaboration is jointly led by Evans Mirageas, The Harry T. Wilks Artistic Director of Cincinnati Opera, and Robin Guarino, Professor of Opera at CCM.
