= Blind Injustice =

Blind Injustice may refer to:

- Blind Injustice, 2005 film by Rex Piano
- Blind Injustice (book), 2017 book by Mark Godfrey about wrongful imprisonment
- Blind Injustice (opera), 2019 opera about wrongful imprisonment and exoneration, based on a book of the same title by Mark Godfrey
