= Paul Curran (director) =

Scottish opera director (born 1964)

Paul Curran (born 1964) is a Scottish opera director. He was General Manager (artistic director) of the opera company of the Norwegian National Opera and Ballet (2007–2011), and artistic consultant to Central City Opera of Denver, Colorado.

== Early life ==
Curran was born in Maryhill, Glasgow. At the age of five, he was rehoused with his family to Easterhouse. He played clarinet in the Glasgow Schools Orchestra, and saw his first opera (Scottish Opera's production of Wozzeck) in 1980.

The following year, his parents discovered that he was gay and threw him out. He went to London, where he trained as a ballet dancer at the London Studio Centre and the Central School of Ballet before studying with Sulamith Messerer. He worked for a time as an usher at English National Opera during the period when Lord Harewood, Mark Elder and David Pountney formed the artistic management of the company.

Curran spent two years at the ballet school of the Finnish National Opera and then three years as a professional dancer with Scottish Ballet and in Germany. A hip injury terminated his ballet career, and he worked as an interpreter and stage manager before, at the age of twenty-seven, entering the National Institute of Dramatic Art in Sydney to study directing.

== Career in opera ==
After graduating, Curran worked for two years as an assistant to Baz Luhrmann on his production of Benjamin Britten's A Midsummer Night's Dream which visited the Edinburgh International Festival in 1994. As well as taking over responsibility for reviving this production, he assisted on other productions and worked as an interpreter. In the latter capacity, he encountered Valery Gergiev when the Kirov Opera visited Edinburgh in 1995, and was engaged to restage Prince Igor for a gala performance in the Royal Albert Hall. In the same year, he made his debut as an independent freelance opera director with an open-air Magic Flute for Bloomsbury Opera.

Curran's subsequent opera productions have included:

- Ariadne auf Naxos, La Fenice, Venice, 2002
- Billy Budd, Santa Fe Opera, 2008
- La bohème, Santa Fe, 2007
- La Cenerentola, Teatro di San Carlo, Naples, 2003
- Daphne, Venice, 2005
- Death in Venice, Garsington Opera, 2015
- Eva (Josef Bohuslav Foerster), Wexford Festival Opera, 2004
- La donna del lago, Santa Fe, 2013
- Faramondo, for Göttingen International Handel Festival (2014) and Brisbane Baroque (2015)
- La finta giardiniera, Garsington Opera, 2003
- Die Frau ohne Schatten, Lyric Opera of Chicago, 2007
- I gioielli della Madonna, University College Opera, 2000
- Hamlet, designed by Vivienne Westwood, for the Clerkenwell Music Series
- Königskinder, Naples, 2002
- Kullervo (Aulis Sallinen), University College Opera, 2001 (British premiere)
- Lady Macbeth of Mtsensk, Canadian Opera Company, Toronto, 2007
- I Lombardi, Florence, 2005
- Lucia di Lammermoor, Halle, 2006
- A Midsummer Night's Dream (conducted by Steuart Bedford and designed by Curran), Naples, 2000
- Mirandolina (Bohuslav Martinů), Wexford, 2002
- Otello, Teatro Lirico Giuseppe Verdi, Trieste, 2001
- Otello, Welsh National Opera, 2008
- Peter Grimes, Trieste, 2002
- Peter Grimes, Santa Fe, with Anthony Dean Griffey and Christine Brewer, 2005
- Schwanda the Bagpiper, Augsburg, 2007
- The Rape of Lucretia, Central City Opera, near Denver, 2008
- The Tales of Hoffmann, Central City Opera, 2004
- Tannhäuser, La Scala, Milan, 2005
- Tosca, Mariinsky Theatre, Saint Petersburg, 2007
- Tosca, Toronto, 2007
- Il trovatore, Teatro Communale, Bologna, 2005
- The Tsar's Bride, The Royal Opera, Covent Garden, 2011
- Turandot, Teatro Petruzzelli, Bari, 2023

Curran has also directed the musicals Man of La Mancha and A Funny Thing Happened on the Way to the Forum for the Covent Garden Festival.

Forthcoming productions include Lulu for Chicago, Il trovatore for Bilbao, I puritani in Bologna and Peter Grimes in Oslo and at Washington National Opera.
