= University of Cincinnati – College-Conservatory of Music =

Performing and media arts college in Cincinnati, Ohio, U.S.

Coordinates: 39.12969°N 84.51821°W

University of Cincinnati College-Conservatory of Music
- Other name: CCM
- Former names: Cincinnati Conservatory of Music (1867–1955), College of Music of Cincinnati (1878–1955), Cincinnati College-Conservatory of Music (1955–1962)
- Motto: Juncta Juvant ("Strength in Unity")
- Type: Public (state university)
- Established: 1867; 159 years ago
- Parent institution: University of Cincinnati
- Accreditation: National Association of Schools of Art and Design (NASAD), National Association of Schools of Dance (NASD), National Association of Schools of Music (NASM), National Association of Schools of Theatre (NAST), Higher Learning Commission
- Dean: Peter Jutras, PhD
- Students: 1,353 (Fall 2023)
- Undergraduates: 833 (Fall 2023)
- Location: 290 CCM Blvd, Cincinnati, Ohio, 45221-0003, United States
- Campus: Urban
- Colors: Red - Black - White
- Mascot: Cincinnati Bearcats
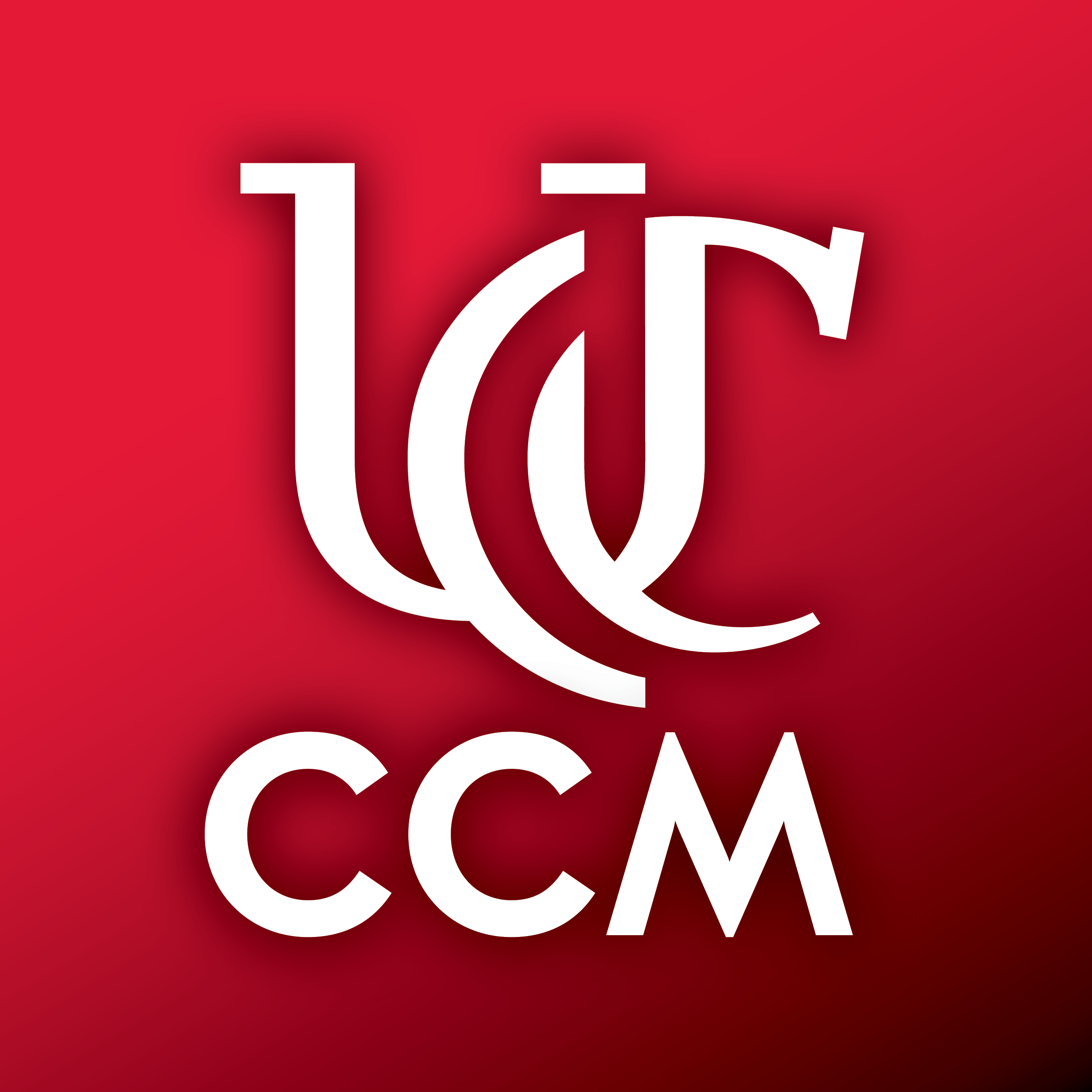

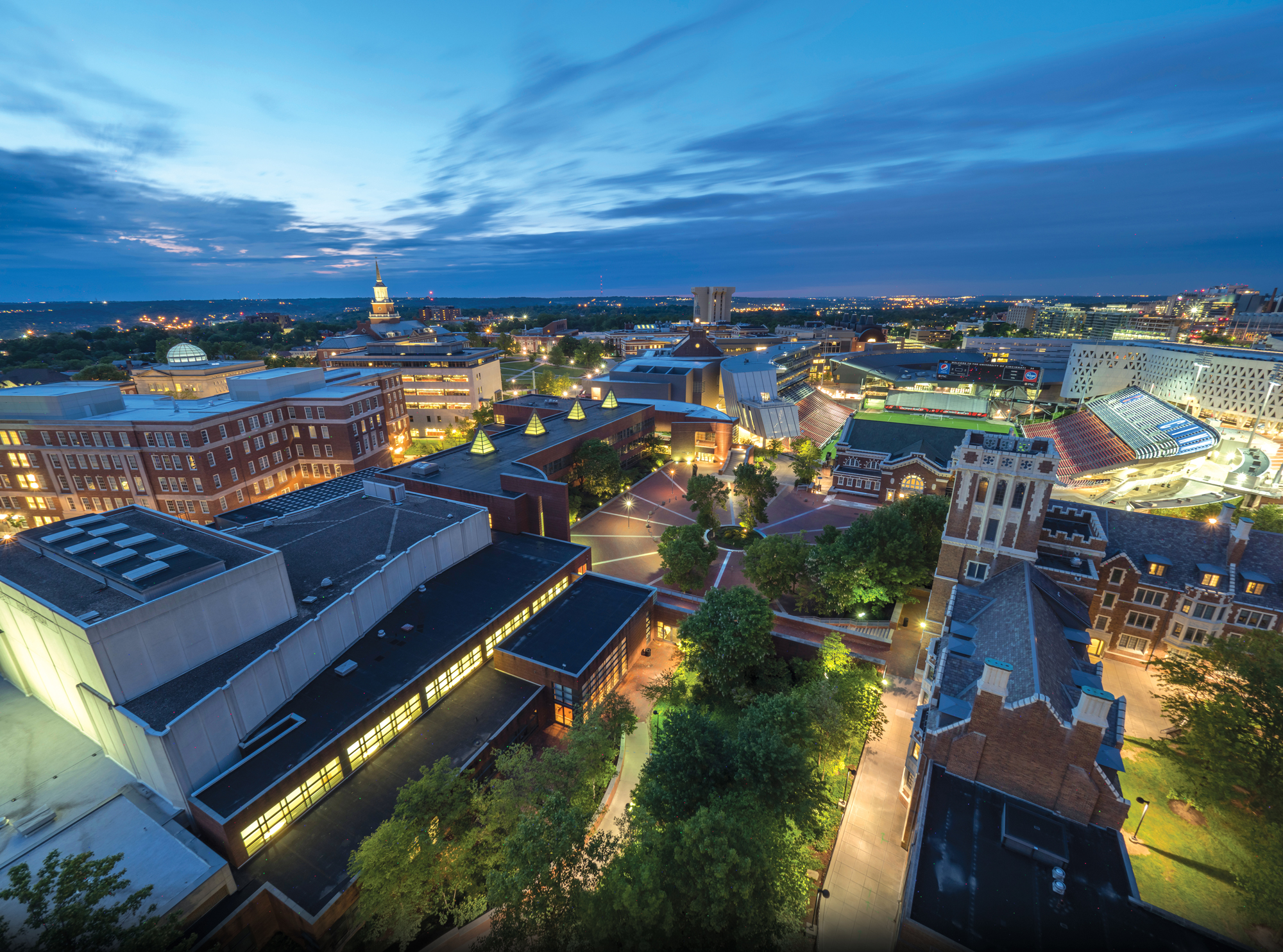
An aerial shot of the "CCM Village" on the campus of the University of Cincinnati in 2017. Photo/Jay Yocis

The University of Cincinnati College-Conservatory of Music (CCM) is a performing and media arts college of the University of Cincinnati in Cincinnati, Ohio. Initially established as the Cincinnati Conservatory of Music in 1867, CCM is one of the oldest continually operating conservatories in the United States.

The college, which enrolls less than 1,500 students a year, has been widely ranked as one of the best performing arts colleges in the United States.

== History ==
=== Early years ===
The Cincinnati College-Conservatory of Music was formed in August 1955 from the merger of the Cincinnati Conservatory of Music, formed in 1867 as part of a girls' finishing school, and the College of Music of Cincinnati, which opened in 1878. CCM was incorporated into the University of Cincinnati on August 1, 1962. The college is sometimes incorrectly referred to as the Cincinnati Conservatory of Music, its original name.

CCM's first opera department was established in 1917 under the leadership of Ralph Lyford, an American composer and conductor. In 1920 Lyford founded the Summer Zoo Opera at the Cincinnati Zoological Gardens, a summer performance series that eventually evolved into what is now known as Cincinnati Opera. Cincinnati Ballet's debut performances took place at Wilson Auditorium on the University of Cincinnati campus in 1964 and 1965. In 1966, the directorship of the ballet company passed on to David McLain, who at the time also headed CCM's Dance Division. Cincinnati Ballet's early connection to CCM gave the new company studio space for classes and rehearsals, access to talented students, and performance space in Wilson Auditorium.

=== Present day ===
CCM has an enrollment of 1,353 as of the Fall 2023 academic term: 833 undergraduate students and 520 graduate students. According to data provided by the college, students come to CCM from 41 different US states and 41 different countries, with international students representing nearly one quarter of the student body.

The college's personnel includes 116 full-time faculty members, 151 part-time faculty members and 53 staff members.

CCM is the largest single source of performing arts presentations in Ohio, with nearly one thousand performances each academic year. Many of these performances are free to University of Cincinnati students and CCM now offers both a music minor and a media production minor. CCM also offers a wide variety of arts elective courses that are open to all University of Cincinnati students.

== Academics ==
=== Music ===
Doctor of Musical Arts degrees are offered in all performance, conducting, and academic areas (except classical guitar and jazz studies) including Ph.D. programs in musicology, music history and music theory. Advanced degrees called Artist Diplomas are available in most performance areas as well. Master of Music degrees are available in all those programs, including classical guitar and jazz studies, as well as collaborative piano and music education. All undergraduate music programs are performance-based and attain a Bachelor of Music degree. A music BA is offered, as well as a minor.

=== Musical Theater ===
Founded in 1969, the musical theater program at CCM is the oldest bachelor's degree program of its class in the United States. It is consistently ranked as one of the nation's top musical theater programs and is presumed to be the most selective undergraduate program at the University of Cincinnati. Playbill consistently reports CCM as one of the top 10 most represented colleges on Broadway. When the COVID-19 pandemic caused the cancellation of the musical theater program's annual senior showcase in New York City, CCM became the first program in the nation to produce a "virtual senior showcase" for casting agents and industry professionals. More recently, Playbill included CCM in its list of "schools of the stars," which included the eight colleges and universities with the most Tony Award nominees in 2024.

=== Opera ===
CCM Opera and vocal studies ranked second in the United States in 2017 and 2020, and Backstage Magazine included CCM on its 2024 list of "12 College Vocal Programs You Should Know." Students and alumni represented in the nation's top young artist programs, including the Lyric Opera of Chicago, San Francisco Opera and Opera Theater Saint Louis. Each March, CCM holds its Opera Scholarship Competition, a vocal competition eligible to students in CCM's graduate opera program, featuring five prizes including full-tuition scholarships plus $10,000 to $15,000 in cash prizes.

=== Acting for Stage and Screen ===
CCM offers a BFA in acting designed to train students for the dramatic theater as well as for work in film and television. While the majority of programs related to the school's theater departments are undergraduate, a number of Master of Fine Arts degree tracks are offered in theater design and production. In 2015, The Hollywood Reporter named CCM number 12 on its list of the top 25 undergraduate drama schools in the world.

=== Theater Design and Production (TDP) ===
CCM TDP is one of two schools in the country to offer an MFA program in Makeup and Wig Design, and one of very few to offer an MFA in Stage Properties. Featuring an 8,500 square foot scene shop, 3,000 square foot costume shop, and wig, make-up and prosthetics studios it has been considered as one of the best schools for hands-on training and learning. CCM TDP offers 13 different degrees all with hands-on training for each discipline. Alumni have gone on to work with Feld Entertainment, Hamilton, Cirque Du Soleil, and many other notable companies.

=== Dance ===
Dance study at CCM emphasizes ballet. The department offers a Bachelor of Fine Arts in dance.

=== Arts Administration ===
CCM offers both an MA in Arts Administration and a dual MBA/MA in Arts Administration in conjunction with the University of Cincinnati's Carl H. Lindner College of Business. The program is focused on preparing students to lead and manage arts organizations.

=== Media Production ===
The largest and fastest growing program at CCM is media production (formerly known as "electronic media"). The program offers a general Bachelor of Fine Arts degree in media production, as well as an academic minor. The program uses a track-based curriculum with tracks in Film and Television Production, Broadcast Media Production and Multimedia Production with focus areas in web-site design, audio production and sports media. The curriculum in each track shares a common first year experience for all students. It requires two semesters of internships, a year-long capstone, and 18 credits in a minor or certificate program in addition to general education foundation from classes across campus. Media Production student organizations include a student radio station and student-run campus television station. Media Production alumni are heavily involved in the college's "CCM Onstage Online" performance broadcast series and "School, Stage and Screen" podcast series.

== Campus ==
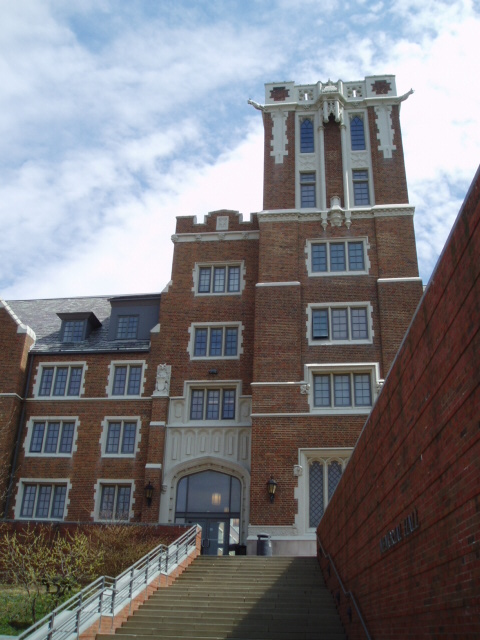
Converted from a dormitory in 1996, Memorial Hall now houses many of CCM's practice rooms and teaching studios.

=== CCM Village ===
Completed in 1999, CCM Village was built at an overall cost of $93.2 million. Under the supervision of Henry Cobb, of Pei Cobb Freed & Partners, renovated structures were merged with new buildings, creating four overall centers: Mary Emery Hall, the Corbett Center for the Performing Arts, Memorial Hall, and the Dieterle Vocal Arts Center. Among other things, the CCM Village includes the Dale Warland Singers Archive, which includes more than 110 choral works and arrangements, first edition copies of all 270 works commissioned by the Dale Warland Singers and a media library that has more than 300 audio and video recordings of the ensemble's performances.

The college's resources also include the Albino Gorno Memorial Library, also known as the "CCM Library," which is located in UC's Carl Blegen Library. The library is adjacent to the CCM Village. Its music library houses more than 150,000 volumes, including books, music scores, periodicals, microforms and recordings that support the full range of programs offered at CCM. The Albino Gorno Memorial Music Library also contains group study spaces, high fidelity media players and a computer lab.

=== Media Production facilities ===
CCM's on-campus media production facilities include a television studio, audio recording studio, 4K Avid Editing lab, Bearcast radio station, multiple audio/video/multimedia workstation labs, digital cinema cameras, lighting, grip and field audio production equipment. These labs, studios and field equipment are scheduled, maintained and available for checkout by media production majors. The labs and studios include:

- the multi-camera Bartlett Television Studio, control room and master control area
- The Ralph J. Corbett Audio Production Center
- The Jack and Joan Strader Radio Center
- The Avid Media Composer/Adobe Creative Suite 4K Postproduction Lab
- The Judith and Jim Van Cleave Multimedia Laboratory

=== Nippert Rehearsal Studio ===
The Nippert Rehearsal Studio, named for Louise Dieterle Nippert, was originally the site of the University of Cincinnati gymnasium and main basketball court from 1911 until 1951. Its windows overlook Nippert Stadium. Since 1951, the space has primarily acted as the main rehearsal hall for all of CCM's mainstage productions.

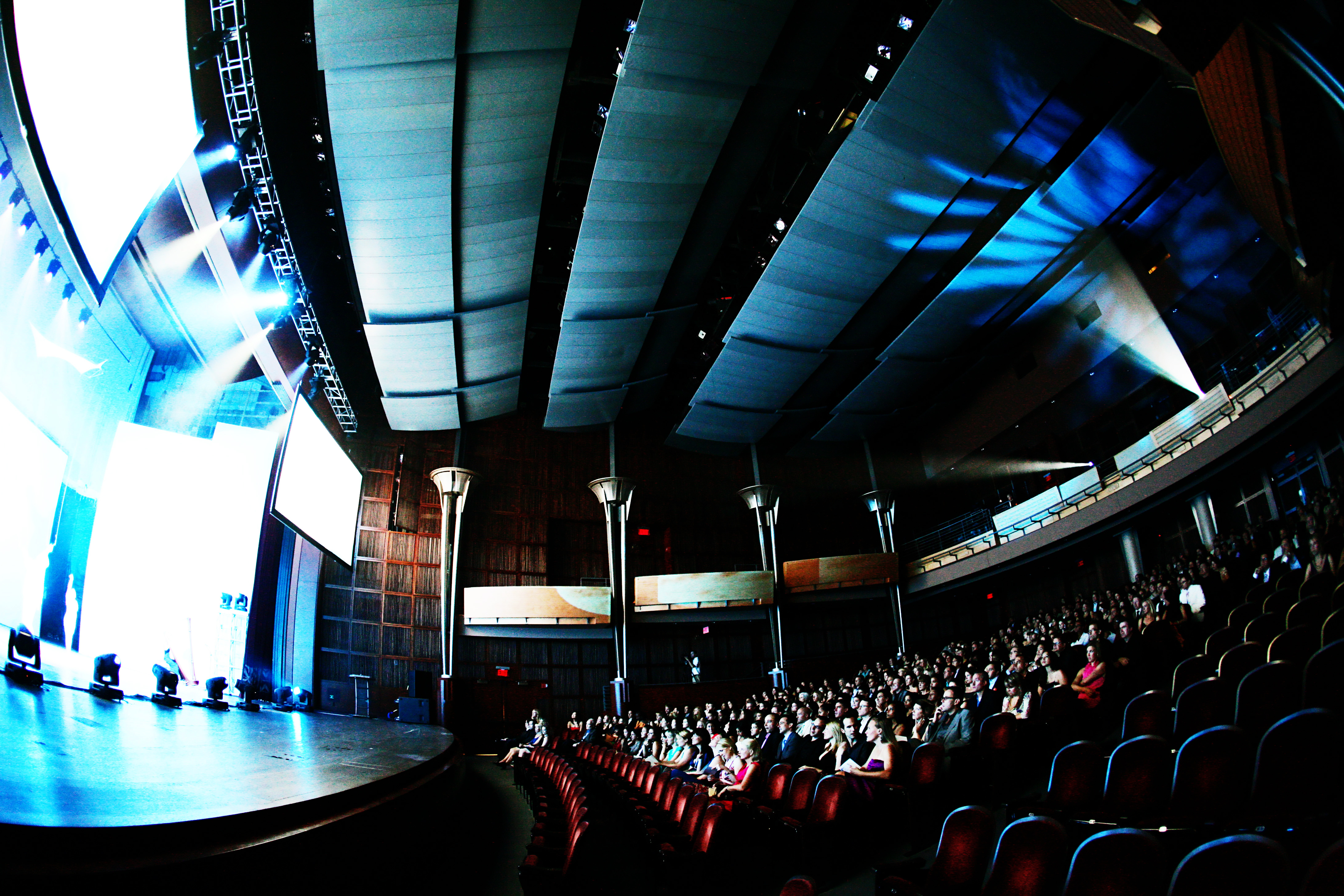
Originally opened in 1967 and most-recently renovated in 2018, the 663-seat Corbett Auditorium is fully equipped with complete stage and lighting facilities for the presentation of choral, orchestral and wind concerts, ballet, opera, musical theatre and recitals. Photo/TM Photography

=== Performance Halls ===
CCM's performance halls include the 663-seat Corbett Auditorium, the 378-seat modified thrust Patricia Corbett Theater, the 250-seat Robert J. Werner Recital Hall, the 140-seat Watson Recital Hall, and the flexible black box Cohen Family Studio Theater. The performance spaces are utilized by the college's large number of performing ensembles, which include:

- two concert orchestras
- four wind ensembles
- two choruses
- several big bands and jazz combos
- a variety of chamber music ensembles and speciality ensembles

Corbett Auditorium, Patricia Corbett Theater and the Cohen Family Studio Theater are also utilized by CCM's Division of Theatre Arts, Production and Arts Administration (TAPAA), which produces approximately 16 musicals, opera, plays and dance productions annually. In 2017, CCM's five main performance halls participated in a ~$15M renovation.

== Ranking ==
Multiple departments at CCM have ranked nationally among university programs for a graduate music degree, including its opera/voice program, its conducting program, French horn, music composition and drama programs. CCM currently holds the number 7 spot on Playbill's 2024-25 list of "10 Most Represented Colleges on Broadway," above the Juilliard School and the Boston Conservatory at Berklee. In 2024, CCM was also designated one of the top "schools of the stars" by Playbill based on the number of alumni performers and designers nominated for the 77th annual Tony Awards. Backstage included CCM in its 2024 lists of "Best Colleges for Singing" and "Top College Musical Theatre Programs in the US." College Factual placed CCM in the top five of its 2023 list of "Top 25 Most Popular Colleges for Music," citing the college's large enrollment and its 88% freshman retention rate. College Factual also recently ranked CCM's music programs "in the top 10% of the country," and placed CCM at #1 in its list of "Best Schools for Music in Ohio." College Gazette included CCM in its 2021 list of "The 10 Best Performing Arts Colleges in the US," highlighting its Musical Theatre, Jazz and Media Production programs specifically. Inside Music Schools ranked CCM at #2 in its list of "Top Classical/Opera Voice Programs," and at #5 in its list of "Top Schools to Study Musical Theatre." CCM has also previously appeared on the Hollywood Reporter's list of Top 25 Undergraduate Drama Schools.

In 2011, CCM was recognized as Ohio's first and only Center of Excellence in Music and Theatre Arts by the Ohio Board of Regents. In 2019, CCM's Jazz Studies program was named the inaugural college affiliate of Jazz at Lincoln Center, which allowed nearly two dozen students and faculty members to accompany Wynton Marsalis and the Jazz at Lincoln Center Orchestra on an international residency in São Paulo, Brazil, from June 22–30, 2019.

== Accreditation ==
The college is an accredited institution of the National Association of Schools of Dance (NASD), the National Association of Schools of Music (NASM), the National Association of Schools of Theatre (NAST), and a member of the University/ Resident Theatre Association (U/RTA). The "Film & TV" and "Multimedia" tracks of CCM's BFA program in Media Production are also accredited by the National Association of Schools of Art and Design (NASAD). In addition, the University of Cincinnati and all regional campuses are accredited by the Higher Learning Commission.

== Notable projects ==
=== Opera Fusion: New Works ===
Opera Fusion: New Works (OF:NW) is a long-running partnership between CCM and Cincinnati Opera. Created in 2011, OF:NW offers composers or composer/librettist teams the opportunity to workshop an opera during a 10-day residency in Cincinnati. Residencies utilize the personnel, facilities, and artistic talent of both CCM and Cincinnati Opera. The workshops are cast with a combination of both CCM students and professional artists, and each workshop concludes with a free public presentation of excerpts followed by an audience question and answer session.

OF:NW's current co-artistic directors are Robin Guarino from CCM and Evans Mirageas from Cincinnati Opera. From the program's inception in 2011 through 2018, Guarino was co-artistic director alongside Cincinnati Opera's Marcus Küchle. OF:NW has fostered the development of 12 new American operas to date, including The Hours, Awakenings, Castor and Patience, Hadrian, Intimate Apparel, Some Light Emerges, Fellow Travelers, Morning Star, Champion and Doubt.

=== Sports Media Broadcasts with ESPN ===
In 2020, CCM's Division of Media Production launched a partnership with the University of Cincinnati's Athletics programs and ESPN, which gives students the opportunity to produce live, multi-camera sports broadcasts for ESPN's various networks and streaming platforms. The Sports Media Production program is run by Emmy Award-winning faculty member Joe Brackman. Cincinnati CityBeat named the partnership with ESPN "Best Student Program with Actual National Exposure" as part of its 2023 "Best of Cincinnati" awards.

=== Blind Injustice ===
The Ohio Innocence Project at the University of Cincinnati College of Law collaborated with Cincinnati Opera, the Young Professionals Choral Collective (YPCC) and CCM to workshop and produce the opera Blind Injustice, which premiered at Cincinnati Opera in 2019. The production was directed by CCM faculty member Robin Guarino. The opera was described as a "powerful piece of music theater" by the Wall Street Journal and "a powerful and moving work, as evident from the audience's enthusiastic response" by Opera News.

== Noted faculty ==
- The Ariel String Quartet (faculty 2012–present) has served as CCM's official string quartet-in-residence since 2012. Formed in Israel in 1998, the Quartet includes violinists Gershon Gerchikov and Alexandra Kazovsky, violist Jan Grüning and cellist Amit Even-Tov.
- Clara Baur was a German-born music teacher who founded the Cincinnati Conservatory of Music, which eventually merged with the College of Music of Cincinnati and the University of Cincinnati to form what is now known as the University of Cincinnati College-Conservatory of Music. The "Baur Room" in CCM's Corbett Center for the Performing Arts is named after Clara and her niece Bertha.
- John Cage was an American composer and music theorist who served as composer-in-residence at CCM from 1967 to 1968. A pioneer of indeterminacy in music, electroacoustic music, and non-standard use of musical instruments, Cage was one of the leading figures of the post-war avant-garde.
- Dorothy Delay was an American violin instructor who taught at CCM for nearly 30 years. Her former students include many noted violinists of the late 20th century. She also taught many significant orchestral musicians and pedagogues.
- Robin Guarino (faculty 2008–2025) is a theatre, opera and film director based in New York City and Cincinnati. Guarino has directed over 90 original productions and her work has been presented by opera companies, festivals, theaters and symphonies including the BAM Next Wave Festival, Canadian Opera Company, The Cincinnati Opera Avery Fisher and Alice Tully Hall, Seattle Opera, San Francisco Opera, HGOco, the Canadian Opera Company, The Glimmerglass Festival, The Bard Summer Festival, The Opera Theatre of St. Louis and Virginia Opera among others. She has served as co-artistic director of CCM's Opera Fusion: New Works initiative with Cincinnati Opera since its inception.
- Mara Helmuth is a composer with special interests in electroacoustic and computer music and research. Her compositions have received numerous performances in the U.S., Canada, Europe, and Asia. She has been on the board of directors of the International Computer Music Association and Society of Electroacoustic Music in the United States, and served as ICMA President. She serves as director of CCM's Center for Computer Music.
- Douglas Knehans (faculty 2008–present) is an American/Australian composer. He is the Norman Dinerstein Professor of Composition Scholar at CCM, where he also served as dean from 2008 to 2010. Knehans is also the director of Ablaze Records, a company which records and produces music by living composers.
- The LaSalle Quartet was a string quartet active from 1946 to 1987, which served as CCM's string quartet-in-residence from 1953 to 1987. After making its European debut in 1954, the LaSalle Quartet won international recognition for its masterful interpretations of the major works in the chamber music repertory. The Quartet became particularly well regarded as the leading interpreters of "The Second Viennese School," performing complete cycles of the quartets of Schoenberg, Berg and Webern throughout the United States and Europe. Cellist Lee Fiser continued to teach at CCM until his retirement in 2017.
- Elliot Madore (faculty 2021–present) is a Grammy Award-winning Canadian lyric baritone. Madore has performed throughout Europe, Canada and the US. He was appointed an associate professor of Voice at CCM in August 2021.
- Kevin McCollum is a Broadway producer who served a three-year term as Distinguished Visiting professor at CCM beginning in 2015. A distinguished alumnus of the University of Cincinnati, McCollum (BFA Musical Theatre, 1984; HonDoc, 2005) is the Tony Award-winning producer of Rent, Avenue Q, In the Heights, Motown the Musical and many other acclaimed Broadway, Off-Broadway and touring productions.
- Nick Photinos (faculty 2023–present) is a four-time Grammy Award-winning cellist and co-founder of Eighth Blackbird who serves as Professor of Chamber Music and Eminent Scholar at CCM. He has received Musical America's Ensemble of the Year Award, the MacArthur Award for Creative and Effective Institutions, the inaugural Chamber Music America Visionary Award, the Naumburg Award and the Concert Artists Guild Grand Prize.
- Awadagin Pratt (faculty 2004–2023) is an American concert pianist who retired from CCM in June 2023. In 1992 he won the Naumburg International Piano Competition and two years later was awarded an Avery Fisher Career Grant. In November 2009, Pratt was one of four artists selected to perform at a classical music event at the White House that included student workshops hosted by the First Lady, Michelle Obama, and performing in concert for guests including President Obama. He has performed two other times at the White House, both at the invitation of President and Mrs. Clinton.
- Miguel Roig-Francolí (faculty 2000–2025) is a music theorist, composer, musicologist and pedagogue who serves as CCM's Distinguished Teaching Professor of Music Theory and Composition. At CCM, he regularly teaches history of theory, sixteenth-century counterpoint, post-tonal theory, music theory pedagogy, and a seminar on the analysis of early music. He is the author of Harmony in Context (McGraw-Hill, 2nd edn., 2011) and Understanding Post-Tonal Music (McGraw-Hill, 2007; Chinese translation, Beijing: People's Music Publishing House, 2012; Routledge, 2nd edn, 2021).
- Kurt Sassmannshaus (faculty 1983–present) is a violinist, teacher, and conductor. He is CCM's distinguished Dorothy Richard Starling Chair for Classical Violin, a position previously held by the late Dorothy Delay. Sassmannshaus has taught around the world, including master classes in Europe, the United States, Japan, China, and Australia, and has worked in close association with Dorothy DeLay both in Cincinnati and at the Aspen Music Festival and School.
- Stuart Skelton (faculty 2021–2024) is a tenor and a graduate of CCM (MM Voice, '95). Skelton joined the college's Voice Performance faculty in August 2021 and was named CCM's J. Ralph Corbett Distinguished Chair in Opera in December 2021.
- Italo Tajo was an Italian operatic bass who began teaching at CCM in 1966. He maintained a significant performance career before and during his 19 years as a faculty member at the college. After Tajo's death in 1993, his wife Indela Tajo donated a scholarship to CCM in Italo's name. The Italo Tajo Archive Room in CCM's Dieterle Vocal Arts Center is named after the former faculty member, and is filled with historical items from his career.
- James Tocco (faculty 1991–2021) served for 30 years as Professor of Piano and Eminent Scholar of Chamber Music at CCM. Tocco has a worldwide career as a soloist with orchestra, recitalist, chamber music performer and pedagogue. His repertoire of over 50 works with orchestra includes virtually the entire standard piano concerto repertoire, as well as more rarely performed works such as the Symphonie Concertante of Szymanowski, the Kammerkonzert of Alban Berg and The Age of Anxiety of Leonard Bernstein. Hailed in solo recitals for his interpretations of Beethoven, Chopin and Liszt, as well as composers of the 20th century, Tocco is one of the few pianists in the world to regularly program the keyboard works of Handel.
- James Truitte (1923–1995) was a dancer who trained with Lester Horton and Alvin Ailey and became known as an authority on Horton's technique and choreography. He started teaching master classes at the conservatory in 1970, being appointed named associate professor in 1973, and in 1993, professor emeritus.

== Noted alumni ==
- Christy Altomare (B.F.A. Musical Theatre '08) – Originating the title role in the 2017 Broadway bound Anastasia, Sophie in Mamma Mia! (Broadway), and Wendla in the National Tour of Spring Awakening
- Kathleen Battle (B.M. Music Education – 1970) – Soprano known for her roles at the Metropolitan Opera and other leading opera houses.
- Shoshana Bean (B.F.A. Musical Theatre – 1999) – known for her role in Wicked as Elphaba.
- Kristen Blodgette (B.M. Piano - 1976, 2 years post-grad, Vocal Accompanying) - Associate Musical Supervisor and Conductor, Phantom of the Opera for its entire Broadway run; Conductor and/or Supervisor for numerous additional Broadway, national tour and resident international productions of Mary Poppins, Chitty Chitty Bang Bang, The Woman in White, Evita, Cats, Sunset Boulevard (with Glenn Close, twice), Sweeney Todd (with Josh Groban), Phantom and many others.
- Ashley Brown (B.F.A. Musical Theatre – 2004) – known for the title role in Broadway production of Mary Poppins
- Elizabeth Brown (B.M. – 1975) – contemporary composer and performer
- Kristy Cates (B.F.A. Musical Theatre – 1999) – Wicked
- Kim Criswell (B.F.A. Musical Theatre – 1979)
- David Daniels (B.M. Vocal Performance) – Countertenor of international fame.
- David P. DeVenney Professor of music and director of choral activities, West Chester University School of Music.
- Eighth Blackbird (1997–2000) – Grammy Award-winning contemporary chamber music ensemble.
- Stephen Flaherty (B.M. Composition – 1982) – Tony Award-winning composer of Ragtime
- Tennessee Ernie Ford (1939) – composer, singer (baritone), radio announcer, television host and author.
- Sara Gettelfinger (Actress; B.F.A. Musical Theatre – 1999)
- David Goldsmith (Writer/Lyricist; B.F.A. Opera/Musical Theatre – 1985) – Motown: The Musical
- Jason Graae (B.F.A. Musical Theatre 1980)
- Kirsten Haglund – Miss America 2008
- Albert Hague (CCM 1942) was a Tony Award-winning composer and lyricist best known for composing the score for the animated television special of How the Grinch Stole Christmas! He also wrote the score for the Broadway musical Redhead. Also an actor, Hague played music teacher Benjamin Shorofsky in the television series Fame.
- Earl Hamner Jr. (BA, 1948; UC HonDoc, 2008) was an American television writer, producer and actor best known for creating and narrating the long-running autobiographical television program The Waltons. A member of CCM's first class of broadcasting graduates, Hamner worked at Cincinnati-based radio station WLW before he began writing for TV and film. Hamner also wrote episodes of the original run of The Twilight Zone, created the television series Falcon Crest and wrote the original animated film adaptation of Charlotte's Web.
- Randy Harrison (Actor; B.F.A. Musical Theatre – 2000)
- Al Hirt – noted trumpeter
- John Holiday - (M.M. Vocal Performance) American operatic countertenor who has appeared in supporting and leading roles with several American opera companies
- Sarah Hutchings (D.M.A. Composition)
- Lauren Kennedy (B.F.A. Musical Theatre – 1993)
- Jenn Korbee – singer/actress, starred in the Emmy nominated television show Hi-5
- Leslie Kritzer (B.F.A. Musical Theatre – 1999) – Star of 2008 musical, A Catered Affair and originated the role of Serena in Legally Blonde: The Musical.
- Aaron Lazar (M.F.A. Musical Theatre – 2000), Fabrizio in The Light in the Piazza on Broadway (also on PBS Broadcast), Carl-Magnus in A Little Night Music, Original Charles Darnay in A Tale of Two Cities, Impressionism on Broadway, Larry Murphy in the US National Tour of Dear Evan Hansen
- Tyler Maynard (B.F.A. Musical Theatre) – Original Cast of Altar Boyz, Flotsum in Disney's The Little Mermaid on Broadway
- Kevin McCollum (B.F.A. Musical Theatre – 1984) – producer of Tony Award-winning productions of Rent and Avenue Q. Also produced The Drowsy Chaperone and [title of show].
- Ricardo Morales, clarinetist
- Dylan Mulvaney, (B.F.A Musical Theatre – 2019) Actress, TikTok Influencer and LGBTQIA+ Activist. Known for "Days of Girlhood", Elder White in "The Book of Mormon" and "The Honest Show"
- Brad Myers (M.M. Jazz) – Jazz guitarist and producer
- Pamela Myers – Musical Theatre. Originated role of Marta in Company
- Anton Nel (M.M., D.M.A. Piano) – Pianist and winner of the 1987 Naumberg International Piano competition, among others.
- Daniel Okulitch, opera bass-baritone
- Karen Olivo (B.F.A. Musical Theatre) – Rent, Brooklyn, original Vanessa in In the Heights, revival Anita in West Side Story (Tony Award win), and Angelica Schuyler in the Chicago cast of Hamilton
- Heather Phillips (B.M.) – operatic soprano
- Faith Prince (Actor; B.F.A. Musical Theatre) – Tony Award winner
- Diana-Maria Riva (Actress; B.F.A. Dramatic Performance – 1991)
- Martha Rofheart Actress and writer, left CCM after two years to audition for the Lunts and then appeared with them in The Pirate in 1942, and was Miss Fontanne's protege. She also appeared with Helen Hayes in Harriet on Broadway and National Tour
- Richard Sparks (D.M.A. Choral Conducting 1997)
- Christian Tetzlaff, German classical violinist.
- Art Tripp (B.M. Music Performance 1966) – Cincinnati Symphony, Frank Zappa and the Mothers of Invention, Captain Beefheart and the Magic Band
- Tony Yazbeck (B.F.A. Musical Theatre) – Al in the 2006 revival of A Chorus Line, Tulsa in the 2008 revival of Gypsy, Gabey in On the Town (Tony nomination), and J.M. Barrie in Finding Neverland
- Constance Cochnower Virtue, composer who developed the Virtue Notagraph
- Donald Lawrence (B.F.A. Musical Theatre) – Multi Stellar award-winning gospel music singer, composer and choir director
- Betsy Wolfe (B.F.A. Musical Theatre 2004) – known for her roles in "Waitress", "Falsettos", and "The Last Five Years."
- Tamara Wilson (B.M. Vocal performance 2004) – operatic soprano who won the Richard Tucker Award in 2016
- Li Chuan Yun, Chinese violin virtuoso and concert artist
