= England in 1819 (band) =

American alternative rock band

- Origin: Baton Rouge/New Orleans, Louisiana, United States
- Genres: Alternative rock, indie rock, electronic
- Years active: 2009–present
- Members: Andrew Callaway, Dan Callaway
- Website: englandin1819.com

England in 1819 is an American alternative group formed in 2009 by brothers Andrew and Dan Callaway. In 2013, they were named one of the "Top Louisiana Bands" by Paste Magazine.

== Formation ==
Originally from Athens, Andrew and Dan grew up in the English countryside, playing in rock bands on the weekends with their father. Andrew continued on to study composition at Oberlin Conservatory and Dan studied French Horn at University of Cincinnati College-Conservatory of Music before continuing on to rock music. After a few years of travel and exposure to a withering classical scene, they returned to their roots, both geographically and musically, moving back to the South and finding new life in the energy and creativity of indie rock.

England in 1819 began in Baton Rouge as a nine-piece experimental/orchestral group using drums, bass, guitar, piano, oboe, French horn and an opera singer. Utilizing a wide dynamic range, the sound was sometimes fragile and other times monstrous. Light and delicate sections developed and expanded into powerful anthemic endings.
