= Ariel String Quartet =

Israeli chamber ensemble

The Ariel String Quartet is a critically acclaimed chamber ensemble, formed in Israel in 1998 by students at the Jerusalem Academy Middle School of Music and Dance. The founding members were teenagers at the time and - with the exception of the founding violist - have remained together since the group’s inception.

Following their First Prize win at the Franz Schubert and Modern Music Competition in Graz in 2003, the quartet relocated to the United States and completed the Professional String Quartet Training Program at the New England Conservatory in 2010.

The ensemble won both the Grand Prize and Gold Medal at the 2006 Fischoff National Chamber Music Competition, and in 2007 they received Third Prize and the Székely Prize for their Bartók performance at the Banff International String Quartet Competition. Reviewing the Banff competition, the American Record Guide praised the Ariel Quartet as "a consummate ensemble gifted with utter musicality and remarkable interpretive power," calling their interpretation of Beethoven’s Op. 132 "the pinnacle of the competition."

Since 2012, the Ariel Quartet has served as the faculty string quartet-in-residence at the University of Cincinnati College-Conservatory of Music (CCM).

The quartet has collaborated with Alisa Weilerstein, Daniil Trifonov, Inon Barnatan, Paul Watkins, and, in earlier years, the late Menahem Pressler. Their artistic development was deeply shaped by studies with members of the LaSalle, Cleveland, and Amadeus Quartets.

The quartet has commissioned and premiered works by a number of contemporary composers, including John Harbison, Christopher Theofanidis, Ching-Chu Hu and Matan Porat.

In 2018, the quartet released its debut album on Avie Records featuring Brahms’s String Quartet No. 2 and Bartók’s String Quartet No. 1.

In 2025, the Ariel Quartet began releasing its complete Beethoven string quartet cycle on Orchid Classics. The first volume, featuring the six Op. 18 quartets, was described by The New York Times as "probing and passionate, with a taut ensemble sound and a touch of grit that brought the music to life." Another Times reviewer noted that the group brought “warmth and fierce intelligence” to their interpretations.

The Ariel Quartet has performed at Carnegie Hall, the Louvre in Paris, Jordan Hall in Boston, the Kennedy Center in Washington, D.C., and the Kaisersaal in Frankfurt, where the Frankfurter Allgemeine Zeitung hailed their performance as “a tour de force.”

The Quartet is supported by the America-Israel Cultural Foundation which facilitated the loan of a violin by Petrus Guarneri, as well as a violin by Francesco Rugeri. The ensemble also has on loan a Violoncello by Jean-Baptiste Vuillaume, bearing the ‘St. Cècile’ stamp. The Viola played in the quartet is a modern instrument by Haat-Hetlef Uilderks, completed in 2006.

== Members ==
The members of the quartet are

- Gershon Gerchikov (violin)
- Alexandra Kazovsky (violin)
- Jan Grüning (viola), joined the quartet in 2011
- Amit Even-Tov (violoncello)
