= Acante et Céphise =

Opera by Jean-Philippe Rameau

- Opera by Jean-Philippe Rameau
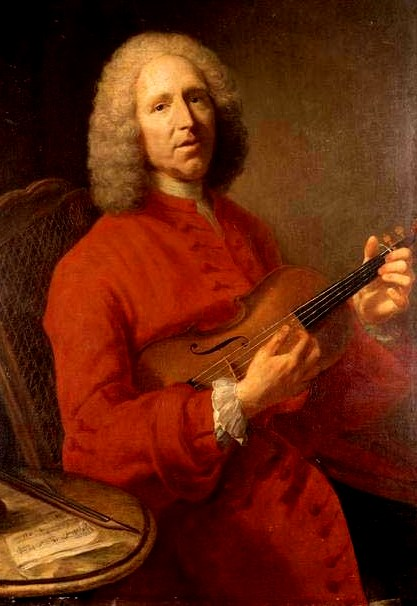
- Portrait of Rameau by Jacques Aved, c. 1728
- Librettist: Jean-François Marmontel
- Language: French
- Premiere: 19 November 1751; Paris Opera

Acante et Céphise, ou La sympathie is an opera by Jean-Philippe Rameau, first performed on 19 November 1751 at the Opéra in Paris. It takes the form of a pastorale héroïque in three acts. The librettist was Jean-François Marmontel. The opera was written to celebrate the birth of the Louis, Duke of Burgundy, the elder brother of the future King Louis XVI.

Although the plot has been described as "puerile....the plot evokes from Rameau a score of remarkable imagination"; it is richly scored and contains the first surviving use of clarinets in a French opera. They appear in the overture, which contains a section imitating the firework display celebrating the birth of the duke.

== Performance history ==
While the first presentation of the opera in the UK took place on BBC radio on 21 November 1983, University College Opera (London) gave the opera's UK staged premiere in March 2012 in the Bloomsbury Theatre and one of the first performances in the world since the 18th century.

== Roles ==
Role	Voice type	Premiere Cast, November 19, 1751 (Conductor: - )
Acante	haute-contre	Pierre Jélyotte
Céphise	soprano	Marie Fel
Oroès	basse-taille	Claude-Louis-Dominique Chassé de Chinais
Zirphile	soprano	Marie-Jeanne Fesch "Mlle Chevalier"
Une fée	soprano	Marie-Angélique Coupée (also spelled Coupé or Couppé)
Deux Coriphèes	haute-contre/bass	François Poirier/Le Page
La grande prêtresse de l'Amour	soprano	Mlle Romainville
Deux autres prêtresses	soprano/mezzo-soprano	Marie-Angélique Coupée/Mlle Gondré
Délie, jeune bergère	ballerina soprano	Mlle Puvignée
Un'autre bergère	soprano	Marie-Jeanne Larrivée Lemière
Un suivant d'Oroès	basse-taille	Cuvillier (or Cuvilier or Cuvelier) fils
Un berger	haute-contre	Jean-Paul Spesoller called (de) La Tour (or Latour)
Une bergère	soprano	Marie-Angélique Coupée

== Synopsis ==
The story concerns a pair of lovers, Acante and Céphise, who suffer at the hands of a wicked genie Oroès. They are saved by the good fairy Zirphile, who uses her magic powers, including the gift of telepathy (the sympathie of the title), to defeat Oroès.

=== Act 1 ===
Céphise is distraught, knowing that an evil Genie loves her and is jealous of the fact that she loves Achante. Their guardian fairy, Zirphile, seems unable to defend her against him or to save Achante from his jealous rage. Zirphile reassures them that destiny has decreed that she will eventually have power over the Genie, but not yet. She must leave them to consult with the Gods and learn how this will come about. In her absence she hopes to protect them through the power of a magic ring. This will unite the lovers in a sort of telepathic bond, so that whatever one feels, the other will feel simultaneously. In that way, if the Genie punishes or even kills his rival Achante, he will also torment or kill the object of his affections.. Achante resists the charm as he does not wish Céphise to suffer either, but Zirphile compels her followers to enact the secret spell. The Genie arrives in a fury and orders Achante to be taken away. He tries to break down Céphise's resistance with the vision of power and riches that an alliance with an immortal might provide. His suite add their persuasions, but she is adamant. Céphise feels the distress of Achante, imprisoned elsewhere... The Genie is at first confused by her communication with the absent lover. Then he recognises the work of Zirphile and realises that he must bring Achante back if Céphise is not to expire. Reunited, the lovers try to appeal to the Genie's better side. He leaves them the rest of the day together, but after that... Achante suggests that they use the time to consult the oracle in the temple of love.

=== Act 2 ===
The Genie has also sought advice in the temple but his questions remain unanswered. Among a crowd of happy and unhappy lovers, Achante and Céphise in their turn consult the oracle. Speaking through the High Priestess, the oracle decrees that when all hearts give themselves joyfully to love then these lovers will be united. It seems an impossible task, since love is so often combined with suffering. The two set about restoring harmony between the unhappy lovers. The Genie seems to have relented. The wish to make Céphise happy has overcome his hatred for Achante. He offers to marry them himself in the temple of love. Seizing a moment aside with Achante, the Genie reveals that he has guessed the existence of Zirphile's spell. He asks Achante for the secret – when it is not forthcoming he reveals his true vengeful feelings and promises to torture them both.

=== Act 3 ===
The lovers are being chained to rocks by the Genie's minions. They feel that love and Zirphile have both abandoned them. They decide to die together. The Genie summons his demons to complete the task. Just as Achante's nerve breaks and he implores the Genie to stop, Zirphile arrives. She brings news that a son has been born to the Bourbon dynasty and this is apparently sufficient reason for happiness to reign throughout. There is a great deal of dancing.
