= Fellow Travelers (opera) =

Opera by Gregory Spears

- Opera by Gregory Spears
- Original production art by Cincinnati Opera
- Librettist: Greg Pierce
- Language: English
- Based on: Fellow Travelers by Thomas Mallon
- Premiere: 17 June 2016; Cincinnati Opera

Fellow Travelers is an opera in 16 scenes composed by Gregory Spears to a libretto by Greg Pierce, based on Thomas Mallon's 2007 novel Fellow Travelers. A co-commission by Cincinnati Opera and G. Sterling Zinsmeyer, the opera was developed by Opera Fusion: New Works, a collaboration between Cincinnati Opera and the University of Cincinnati – College-Conservatory of Music which focuses on the creation of new American operas.

== Performance history ==
Fellow Travelers premiered at Cincinnati Opera in June 2016 in a production directed by Kevin Newbury, which was subsequently presented by the Prototype Festival in New York City in January 2018 and the Lyric Opera of Chicago in March 2018. This production has since been presented by companies such as Des Moines Metro Opera, Virginia Opera, and Arizona Opera. Joseph Lattanzi was the only singer to be part of all of the initial productions listed above, including the original workshop at Cincinnati Opera.

Minnesota Opera presented a new production of Fellow Travelers directed by Peter Rothstein in June 2018. This production has since been presented by companies such as Boston Lyric Opera, Florida Grand Opera, Opera Columbus, and Madison Opera.

In June 2024, Opera Parallèle presented the West Coast premiere of Fellow Travelers in San Francisco in a new production directed by Brian Staufenbiel. A 10th anniversary tour through the USA in 2025–2026 featured a new production by director Kevin Newbury and the Up Until Now Collective. It premiered in Pittsburgh (in November 2025), continued in Seattle and Portland and will be shown in San Diego and at the Glimmerglass Festival in summer 2026.

The European semi-professional premiere was presented by University College Opera in March 2025.

== Roles ==
Roles, voice types, premiere cast
| Role | Voice type | Premiere cast, June 17, 2016 Conductor: Mark Gibson |
|---|---|---|
| Timothy Laughlin | tenor | Aaron Blake |
| Hawkins Fuller | baritone | Joseph Lattanzi |
| Mary Johnson | soprano | Devon Guthrie |
| Senator Charles E. Potter/General Airlie/Bartender | baritone | Vernon Hartman |
| Estonian Frank/Interrogator/Senator Joseph McCarthy | baritone | Marcus DeLoach |
| Potter's Assistant/Bookseller/Party Guest/Technician/French Priest | bass-baritone | Christian Pursell |
| Tommy McIntyre | baritone | Paul Scholten |
| Miss Lightfoot | soprano | Alexandra Schoeny |
| Lucy | soprano | Tayla Lieberman |

== Synopsis ==
The opera is set in Washington D.C., during the McCarthy era of the 1950s and focuses on the "Lavender Scare", a witch hunt and mass firings of gay people from the United States government. The story centers on the love affair between two men working for the federal government—Hawkins "Hawk" Fuller, a State Department official, and Timothy Laughlin, a recent college graduate working in a senator's office.

== Critical reception ==
Fellow Travelers has been widely acclaimed by critics since its premiere in 2016. Corinna da Fonseca-Wollheim wrote in The New York Times following its world premiere in Cincinnati, "The opening act is a near-perfect example of fast-flowing musical drama. The budding attraction between Tim and Hawk has all the infectious warmth, humor and sweetness of the early scenes in "La Bohème." . . . With its smart music and sharp-edged romantic drama, "Fellow Travelers" seems assured of lasting appeal. But the large clusters of audience members who stayed behind in the lobby after Sunday's performance discussing and analyzing the show suggest that – at this moment in time, in particular – it offered much more than mere entertainment."

Reviewing the New York premiere, Anthony Tommasini in The New York Times wrote: "Originality in the arts is a vague and overhyped virtue. Few works are completely original. All creative artists borrow from others, both masters they revere and contemporaries they may be in competition with. Still, originality just comes through sometimes, as the composer Gregory Spears demonstrates in his personal, boldly quirky score for the wrenching, and sadly timely, opera Fellow Travelers."

And describing the music of Fellow Travelers, John von Rhein wrote in the Chicago Tribune following the performances at the Lyric Opera of Chicago: "Spears is unusually sensitive to the irregular cadences of American speech, and his setting of words to music is masterly... Fellow Travelers is one of the most accomplished new American operas I have encountered in recent years."

== Scenes ==
1. Park in DuPont Circle. Tim is sitting on a park bench writing in a notepad. A stranger, Hawk, starts a conversation with him, learning that Tim is an intern reporter, Hawk impresses him with insider's knowledge of D.C. politics. Hawk makes gentle fun of Tim's drinking milk, but gives his shoulder an affectionate squeeze when he leaves.
2. Potter's Office. Hawk has recommended Tim to Senator Potter. Tim submits a sample of his writing and is hired.
3. Hawk's Office. Tim is seen buying a book, inscribing it and crossing to Hawk's office where Mary and Miss Lightfoot are gossiping. The book is a thank-you gift for Hawk's recommending him. Mary knows that Hawk "has snagged another one", i.e. another young man whom he hopes to involve in a homosexual relationship.
4. Tim's Apartment. Hawk drops in as Tim is cooking dinner. Hawk kisses him and together they dream of lying "under the sheets" in Bermuda as partners.
5. St. Peter's Cathedral. Tim, alone, meditates on the sin he has committed with Hawk.
6. Christmas Party at the Hotel Washington. Mary understands the gay relationship while Miss Lightfoot is puzzled by Hawk's calling Tim "an Irish Tiger Cub".
7. Interrogation Room M304. Hawk is given several absurd tests that the Interrogator believes might reveal homosexuality – walking to a wall to detect hip swaying, direct questioning, reading a passage with a lot of "s's" to detect sibilants. Finally he is allowed to go after skillfully passing a lie detector test.
8. Tim's Apartment. Tim tries to get Hawk interested in a weekend together or at least a date. Hawk reveals that he was called in for questioning because Miss Lightfoot betrayed him by reporting his homosexuality. He knows it was Miss Lightfoot because she quit when he got the summons.

Intermission

9. McCarthy Meeting. McCarthy is told that his "special friendship" with Roy Cohn is known to the press, so he will have to be fired. Tim walks away from this conversation, apparently disgusted.
10. Mary's Kitchen. Mary tries to warn Tim about Hawk. Hawk enters and tells Tim that he wants to celebrate by bringing another boy into their relationship. Tim yells at him to get out. Hawk leaves with the attitude of not caring but afterwards is seen in agony.
11. Roof of the Old Post Office. Hawk is unhinged. Tim is disheveled. Tim has decided that the only way to get over his obsession with Hawk is to enlist in the army.
12. Hawk's Office. Mary gives Hawk her letter of resignation. She cannot work for Hawk, who is a notorious seducer of young men but who has enough clout to avoid the firings that his friends are being subjected to. She also blames him for breaking Tim's heart.
13. Tim in France / Hawk in Foggy Bottom. Hawk and Tim exchange letters. Tim as a reporter for the Army newspaper has become interested in European politics, especially in the plight of the Hungarian refugees. Hawk, now married (to a woman) and a homeowner, says it is time for both of them to grow up.
14. Brick House. Hawk and Tim, now older and more mature, converse in a conventional brick house that Hawk is renting for them as a love nest. Hawk tells Tim that he is married. He betrays his knowledge of Tim's being fired and asks if he can do Tim a favor, presumably as a kind of recompense. Tim asks if he can get him put in charge of the Hungarian Refugee Relief effort. Tim reveals that he goes to confession. At this point a mini-scene is inserted between the priest and Tim in which Tim tells the disappointed priest that he cannot give up Hawk. Tim leaves the house out of anger and jealousy after Hawk describes his contentment in being married and insists that they cannot have a domestic and constant relationship.
15. Mary's Kitchen. Mary, fed up with Washington, is packing to move back to New Orleans. Hawk asks her to tell Tim that he was the one who outed him so that Tim will hate him and thus be relieved from his obsession. Mary, disgusted, calls Hawk a swine. She goes to Tim and explains why he didn't get the job he was qualified for, telling him that Hawk wasn't the man Tim wanted him to be.
16. Park in DuPont Circle. Hawk comes to the same park bench seen in scene 1 to bid Tim a final farewell. Tim says he is going back to New York to live with his sister and be "Uncle Tim" to her kids. He says he has tried to hate Hawk, but cannot.

== Commercial recording ==
An audio recording of Fellow Travelers was released in 2017 by the Cincinnati Symphony Orchestra's Fanfare Cincinnati record label featuring the original cast from the world premiere, with Mark Gibson conducting the Cincinnati Symphony Orchestra.

== Music and instrumentation ==
The opera is scored for a 17-person chamber orchestra. According to the Opera News critic, the score uses minimalist soundscapes combined at times with a "neo-Puccinian lyricism".

== See also ==
- Fellow Travelers (miniseries)
- Harvey Milk (opera)
- Patience and Sarah (opera)
