= Morning Star (opera) =

Opera by Ricky Ian Gordon

- Opera by Ricky Ian Gordon
- Official art by Cincinnati Opera
- Librettist: William M. Hoffman
- Language: English
- Premiere: 30 June 2015; Cincinnati Opera

Morning Star is an opera by composer Ricky Ian Gordon and librettist William M. Hoffman and tells the story of a Russian Jewish family who immigrates to New York City in 1910. It is based on a 1940 play of the same name by Sylvia Regan. The opera was developed by Opera Fusion: New Works, a collaboration between Cincinnati Opera and the University of Cincinnati College-Conservatory of Music, which focuses on the creation of new American operas. It premiered at Cincinnati Opera in June 2015.

== History ==
Ricky Ian Gordon started writing Morning Star in the late 1990s, when he was the resident composer at the Lyric Opera of Chicago. It was going to be a collaboration between the Lyric Opera of Chicago and the Goodman Theatre; however, the project was soon dropped. In 2012, it was brought back to life by Opera Fusion: New Works, a collaboration between Cincinnati Opera and the University of Cincinnati College-Conservatory of Music dedicated to the development of new American opera. In June 2015, Morning Star premiered at Cincinnati Opera.

== Synopsis ==
The opera tells the story of the Felderman family, a Russian Jewish family who immigrates to Manhattan's Lower East Side in 1910. It is set against the backdrop of the Triangle Shirtwaist Factory fire and follows the family through World War I and the Great Depression.

== Music and instrumentation ==
The Chicago Tribune described the score as blending "melodic arioso, accompanied recitative, Broadway-style ballads, stirring ensembles, and Tin Pan Alley and ragtime elements." This piece calls for a small orchestra.

== Critical reception ==
Critical reception for this opera was mixed. The Chicago Tribune stated that this opera had "considerable heart, power, and poignancy." The Cincinnati Enquirer said that "Hoffman's libretto was at times poetic or sentimental, other times groaningly clichéd." Opera News, on the other hand, called Morning Star "a rich, complex work."
