= Arjuna's Dilemma =

American chamber opera

- Chamber opera by Douglas Cuomo

Arjuna's Dilemma is a chamber opera created by Douglas Cuomo in 2008. The philosophical dilemma faced by Arjuna in the Bhagavad Gita is dramatized in operatic form with a blend of Indian classical music, Western Classical music, and jazz with lyrics in Sanskrit.

Arjuna’s Dilemma is an 80-minute opera-oratorio. The opera includes a vocalist, a classically trained tenor, a four-member female chorus, a tabla player, an improvising tenor saxophonist, and a ten-piece chamber ensemble. The performers play versions of the Hindu god Krishna, Arjuna's charioteer in the battle, who convinces the initially hesitant Arjuna to fight an army including his relative, friends, and teachers to regain his kingdom after revealing his (Krishna's) own divine identity as well as the true nature of the universe. According to Cuomo, the story is about the need to fight "the morally right battle and the philosophically right battle" of overcoming one's conditioning to correctly interpret reality.

Arjuna’s Dilemma has been produced by the Music-Theatre Group, and it was performed at BAM's Next Wave Festival and during the 2017 annual conference of Opera America at the Winspear Opera House. It was the first opera to be performed in Nepal. A recording of Arjuna’s Dilemma, released on Innova Recordings, was performed by artists including Indian singer Amit Chatterjee, members of Anonymous 4 and the Philip Glass Ensemble, tenor Tony Boutté, Badal Roy, Ethel, pianist Kathleen Supové, and bassist Robert Black.

The New York Times described Arjuna's Dilemma as "an opera with an appealing and unabashedly eclectic score." New York Magazine's Justin Davidson called it, "a pile of half-realized good ideas."

== See also ==
- Doctor Atomic
- Satyagraha (opera)
- Sāvitri (opera)
