= Constance Cochnower Virtue =

American classical composer

Constance Cochnower Virtue (6 January 1905 – 21 February 1992) was an American composer and organist who developed a musical notation system called the Virtue Notagraph.

== Life and career ==
Virtue was born in Cincinnati, Ohio, to Robert and Edith Rankin Cochnower. She married Navy doctor Clark W. Virtue and they had two children, Christie and Robert.

Virtue received a B.M. from the University of Cincinnati in 1927, and a master's degree in sacred music from the Union Theological Seminary in New York in 1945. She gave private piano and organ lessons and taught at Grossmont College from 1961 to 1963. She also served as the organist/music director at several churches in New York and California. In 1968, she toured as the pianist with an opera program for Alaska Music Trails.

Virtue developed the Notagraph, which has a seven-line staff, in 1933 as a new system of musical notation. She trademarked the Notagraph and published two books about it: Design for a Modern Notation (1945) and Music without Accidents (1975).

Virtue was a member of Mu Phi Epsilon and the American Guild of Organists. Her papers are archived at the University of California San Diego Center for Research in Computing and the Arts. Her music was published by H.W. Gray and G. Schirmer, Inc.

== Works ==
Virtue's compositions include:

=== Chamber ===
- Fairy Tale for a Sleepy Child (cello)
- For Spring Returning (violin)
- Romanza (violin, cello and piano)
- String Quartet in G

=== Orchestra ===
- Mystic Sonnet: To a Tree in Bloom (also arranged for piano)

=== Theater ===
- Queen of Camelot (musical)
- What Gift to the King? (Christmas music drama)

=== Vocal ===
- "Farragut March Song"
- "I Will Lift Up Mine Eyes"
- "Love is Like a Rose" (text by Christina Georgina Rossetti)
- Six Songs from the Chronology of Love
