= University College Opera =

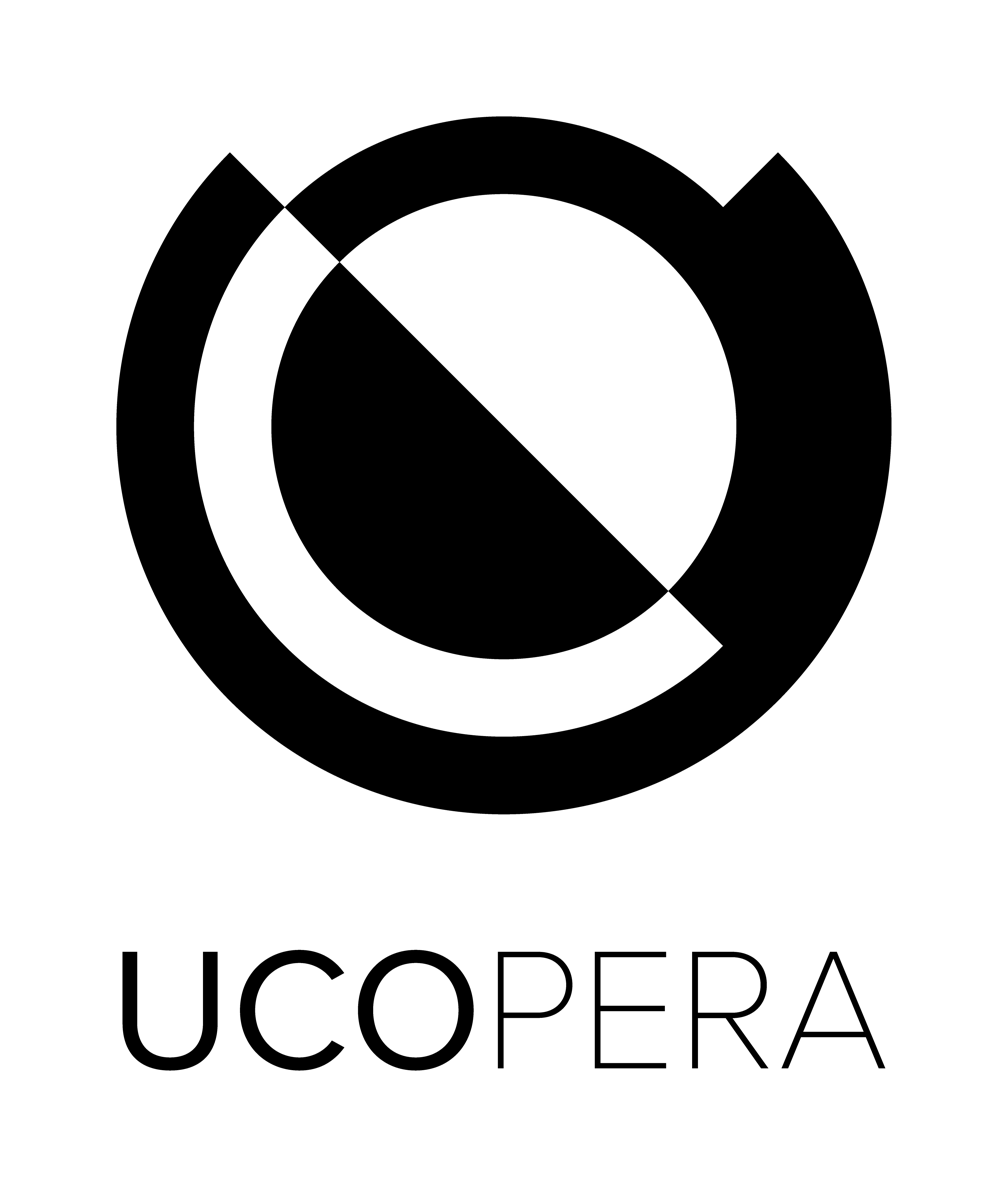

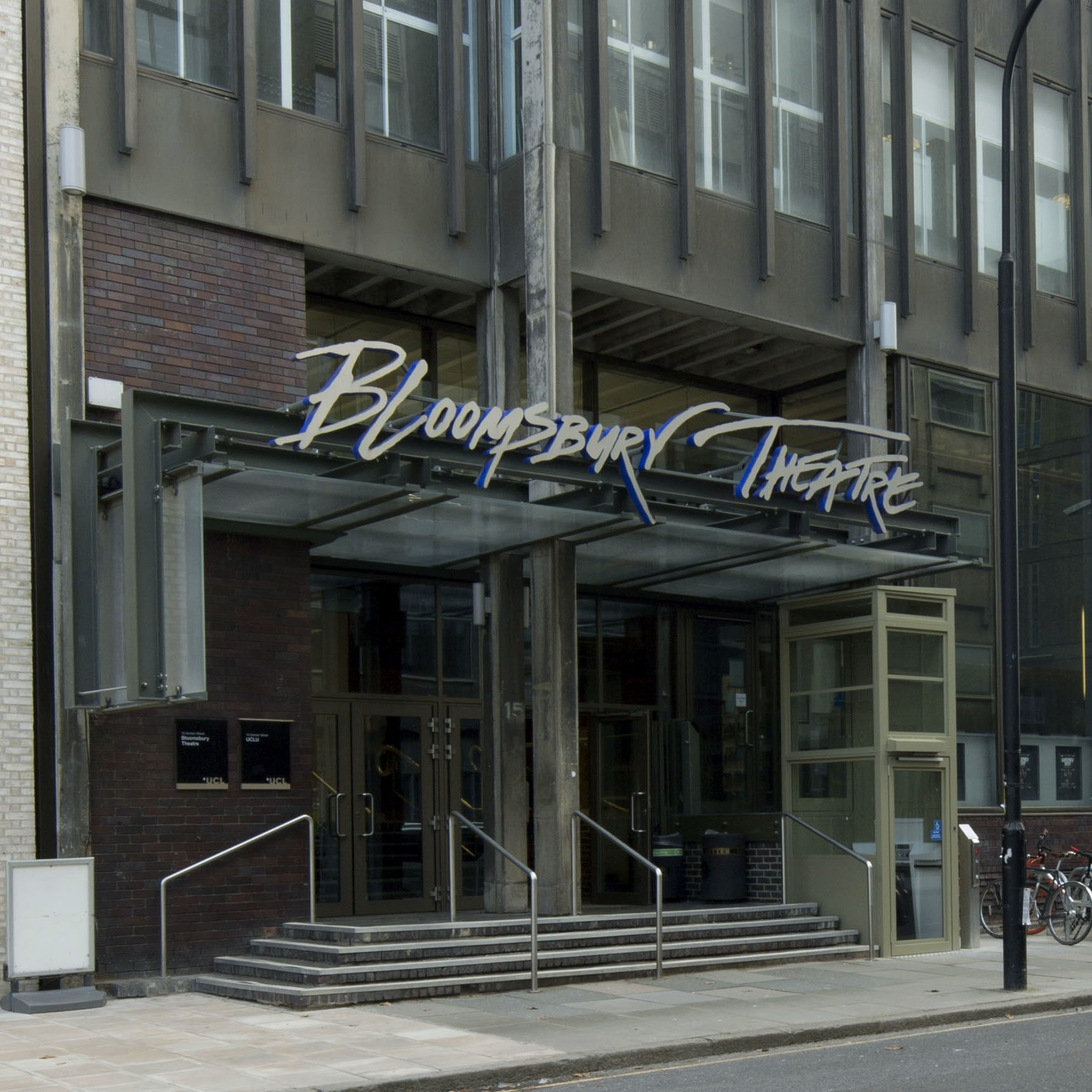
- The Bloomsbury Theatre, University College Opera's main performance venue
- Abbreviation: UCOpera
- Formation: 1951; 75 years ago
- Type: Student opera company
- Location: London, United Kingdom
- Parent organization: Students' Union UCL
- Affiliations: UCL Symphony Orchestra; UCL Symphony Chorus
- Website: ucopera.co.uk

University College Opera, or UCOpera, is the student opera company of University College London. The operas are staged by professional singers, directors and designers, with the orchestra, chorus and some singers drawn from the student body. Founded in 1951, UCOpera is renowned for its productions of under-performed operas, which include the stagings of 3 world premières and 23 British premières to date. On 10 March 2008, UCOpera staged the UK première of Édouard Lalo's Fiesque, at the Bloomsbury Theatre. 2009 saw another British première, Ernest Bloch's Macbeth. UCOpera extended its list of British premières by staging Gounod's Polyeucte at Theatre Royal Stratford East in 2018, Smetana's Czech national opera Libuše in 2019, and Robert Ward's The Crucible in 2024. In 2025, UCOpera held the European première of Gregory Spears' Fellow Travelers.

== History ==
The brainchild of the conductor Anthony Addison, (UCL's then Director of Music), University College Opera gave its first performance in 1951 with an all-student production of Purcell's Dido and Aeneas, followed by Mozart's Bastien und Bastienne. Even in its earliest years, the company's annual repertoire concentrated on rarely performed operas including: Nicolai's The Merry Wives of Windsor (1952), Bizet's Don Procopio (1955) and Lortzing's Der Wildschütz (1958). In 1961, the company staged its first UK première, Moniuszko's Halka.

During its first 17 years, UCOpera's performances took place in the old gymnasium at University College. With the opening of the college's Bloomsbury Theatre in 1968, the company finally acquired a suitable venue for its productions. Under the directorship of George Badacsonyi who served from 1963 to 1976, UCOpera increasingly employed professional opera singers (often in the early stages of their careers) to sing the solo roles, with students making up the chorus and orchestra. Amongst the professional singers who have appeared with the company are Felicity Lott (who is now the patron of Friends of UCOpera), Robert Lloyd, Jonathan Summers and Julian Gavin. The company's productions also became more ambitious with a series of UK and world premières including: Wagner's Das Liebesverbot (1965); Haydn's Die Feuersbrunst (1966); Erkel's Bánk bán (1968); and Verdi's Alzira (1970).

A highlight for the company under the directorship of David Drummond (who served from 1992 to 2001) was UCOpera's world première staging of César Franck's Hulda in its complete form. The 1994 production used a score which Drummond restored from the composer's original manuscript. Drummond's last performance as the company's Director coincided with its 50th anniversary, the 2001 UK première of Aulis Sallinen's Kullervo.

Under the directorship of Charles Peebles, UCOpera has produced British premières of Hahn's Ciboulette, Dvořák's Vanda, Lalo's Fiesque, Gounod's Polyeucte and Smetana's Libuše. In 2012 UCOpera produced the first staging of Rameau's Acante et Céphise since the 18th century. After staging at least one opera a year for 69 years, the continuity was broken in 2020, as the production of Haydn's L'anima del filosofo was cancelled due to the COVID-19 pandemic.

Since 2022, UCOpera has been under the baton of Matt Scott Rogers. The first UCOpera production under Rogers was Carlisle Floyd's Susannah (2023). This was followed in 2024 by the company's UK première of Robert Ward's The Crucible, adapted from the celebrated Arthur Miller play. In 2025, UCOpera staged the European première of Gregory Spears' Fellow Travelers, based on the 2007 novel of the same name by Thomas Mallon, with Eleanor Strutt returning to direct.

== Productions since 2001 ==
Year	Production	Composer	Conductor	Director
2025	Fellow Travelers***	Gregory Spears	Matt Scott Rogers	Eleanor Strutt
2024	The Crucible*	Robert Ward	Matt Scott Rogers	Eleanor Strutt
2023	Susannah	Carlisle Floyd	Matt Scott Rogers	Isabelle Kettle
2022	La naissance d'Osiris	Rameau	Charles Peebles	Annelise Bucher (choreographer)
2022	Thamos, König in Ägypten (incidental music)	Mozart	Charles Peebles	concert performance
2019	Libuše*	Smetana	Charles Peebles	Cecilia Stinton
2018	Polyeucte*	Gounod	Charles Peebles	Thomas Guthrie
2017	Aroldo	Verdi	Charles Peebles	Pia Furtado
2016	La favorite	Gaetano Donizetti	Charles Peebles	John Ramster
2015	Amadis de Gaule	Johann Christian Bach	Charles Peebles	Jack Furness
2014	The Snowmaiden	Rimsky-Korsakov	Charles Peebles	Christopher Cowell
2013	I Lombardi	Verdi	Charles Peebles	Jamie Hayes
2012	Acante et Céphise*	Rameau	Charles Peebles	Christopher Cowell
2011	The Three Pintos (Die Drei Pintos)	Weber/Mahler	Charles Peebles	John Ramster
2010	Genoveva	Schumann	Charles Peebles	Emma Rivlin
2009	Macbeth*	Bloch	Charles Peebles	John Ramster
2008	Fiesque*	Lalo	Charles Peebles	Emma Rivlin
2007	Camacho's Wedding	Mendelssohn	Charles Peebles	Duncan Macfarland
2006	Alfonso und Estrella	Schubert	Charles Peebles	Stephen Barlow
2005	Whittington	Offenbach	Charles Peebles	Jamie Hayes
2004	Vanda*	Dvořák	Charles Peebles	Matthias Janser
2003	Ciboulette*	Hahn	Charles Peebles	Daniele Guerra
2002	Benvenuto Cellini	Berlioz	Charles Peebles	Jamie Hayes
2001	Kullervo*	Sallinen	David Drummond	Paul Curran

(* denotes British premières)

(*** denotes European premières)

== Productions 1951 to 2000 ==
Year	Production	Composer
1951	Dido and Aeneas	Purcell
1951	Bastien and Bastienne	Mozart
1952	Merry Wives of Windsor	Nicolai
1953	La Clemenza di Tito	Mozart
1954	L'elisir d'amore	Donizetti
1955	Don Procopio	Bizet
1955	Bastien and Bastienne	Mozart
1956	Il Turco in Italia	Rossini
1957	The Devil and Kate	Dvořák
1958	Der Wildschutz	Lortzing
1959	The Barber of Baghdad	Cornelius
1960	Beatrice and Benedict	Berlioz
1961	Halka*	Moniuszko
1962	Lodoïska	Cherubini
1963	I due Foscari	Verdi
1964	Sorochyntsi Fair	Mussorgsky
1965	Das Liebesverbot*	Wagner
1966	Die Feuersbrunst*	Haydn
1967	Poliuto	Donizetti
1967	Le cadi dupé	Gluck
1967	Livietta e Tracollo	Pergolesi
1967	The Tide	Blacher
1968	Bánk Bán*	Erkel
1969	Leonore**	Beethoven
1970	Alzira*	Verdi
1971	Armide	Gluck
1972	Hans Heiling	Marschner
1973	Stiffelio	Verdi
1974	Clytemnestra	Wishart
1975	Euryanthe	Weber
1976	Macbeth (1st Version)*	Verdi
1977	Saul and David*	Nielsen
1978	The Maid of Orleans*	Tchaikovsky
1979	Attila	Verdi
1980	The Duenna*	Prokofiev
1981	Hérodiade	Massenet
1982	Oberto*	Verdi
1983	Gwendoline*	Chabrier
1984	Faust	Spohr
1985	Le Villi	Puccini
1985	Edgar	Puccini
1986	Die Loreley*	Bruch
1987	The Devil's Wall*	Smetana
1988	Il Corsaro	Verdi
1989	Giovanna d'Arco	Verdi
1990	Un Giorno di Regno	Verdi
1991	Lakmé	Delibes
1992	Le Roi d'Ys	Lalo
1993	Ruslan and Ludmila	Glinka
1994	Hulda**	Franck
1995	La Wally	Catalani
1996	The Ballad of Baby Doe**	Moore
1997	The King and the Marshal*	Heise
1998	Mignon	Thomas
1999	Mazeppa	Tchaikovsky
2000	The Jewels of the Madonna	Wolf-Ferrari

(* denotes British premières)

(** denotes world premières)
