= David P. DeVenney =

David P. DeVenney is the former professor of music and director of choral activities at the West Chester University School of Music. DeVenney holds a B.M. from Iowa State University, an M.M. from the University of Wisconsin–Madison, and a D.M.A. from the University of Cincinnati – College-Conservatory of Music in conducting. At West Chester, he conducted the Women's Chorus, Men's Chorus and the Concert Choir, in addition to teaching conducting and guiding the graduate choral conducting program.

DeVenney has published numerous books and articles on music and serves as General Editor of the Research Memorandum Series published by Chorus America. The Choral Journal has called DeVenney "one of the most industrious scholars on the current scene," while MLA Notes has labeled his contributions to the study of American choral music "a significant achievement." He was given the Dean's award for artistic excellence in 2003 and in 2006 was named Distinguished Music Alumnus at Iowa State University; he has several times been named Outstanding Teacher by the WCU Honors College.
