= Blind Injustice (opera) =

Opera about wrongful convictions and their reversal

- Opera by Scott Davenport Richards
- Librettist: David Cote
- Language: English
- Premiere: 22 July 2019; Cincinnati Opera, Ohio

Blind Injustice is an opera based on the stories of six people who were wrongfully convicted of crimes in Ohio, and who eventually had their convictions overturned through the work of the Ohio Innocence Project. The opera was commissioned by the Cincinnati Opera; it was written by librettist David Cote and composer Scott Davenport Richards. The libretto was based in part on the book Blind Injustice by Ohio Innocence Project co-founder Mark Godsey, and on interviews with those whose stories are portrayed. The opera opened at Cincinnati Opera on July 22, 2019.

== Composition and premiere ==
Although the opera is based on Mark Godsey's book of the same title, work on the opera began pre-publication based on a rough draft. Members of the Ohio Innocence Project (OIP) young professionals committee met in early 2017 with members of Cincinnati's Young Professional Choral Collective (YPCC) to discuss devising choral music based on OIP's work; YPCC's founding director, KellyAnn Nelson, saw the opportunity to create something larger. Cincinnati Opera became involved and commissioned the creation of the opera. The opera was initially workshopped in collaboration with the University of Cincinnati College-Conservatory of Music (CCM).

Librettist David Cote worked with director, dramaturge and CCM faculty member Robin Guarino to develop the opera's text in early 2018. Approximately 40 percent of the libretto is drawn directly from interviews with the exonerees; their stories are at the heart of the opera. Adjustments to the libretto were still being made in mid 2019, to reflect exonerees' civil cases for restitution. Scott Davenport Richards's score includes elements of jazz, blues, minimalism, and hip-hop. The score was released bit by bit to the creative team throughout 2018. In November 2018, a workshop was held to introduce some of the musical numbers to the exonerees themselves as well as collect creative feedback.

The opera, which consists of one 90-minute act, premiered at the Wilks Studio Theatre in Cincinnati's Music Hall on July 22, 2019, directed by Robin Guarino. The narrow stage was flanked by audience members seated on either side, giving it the intimate feel of courtroom. The orchestra comprised members of the Cincinnati Symphony Orchestra under the direction of John Morris Russell. Members of YPCC served as part of the chorus.

Some performances were followed by question-and-answer sessions with the real life exonerees represented in the opera.

The opera was performed in Colorado in 2023 by Opera Theatre of the Rockies and was performed in February 2024 at Peak Performances in New Jersey. In February 2025 it will premiere in New York City's Lincoln Center, a production of MasterVoices. In July 2025, it will run in Cleveland, Ohio at Playhouse Square.

== Roles ==
The main characters in the opera are all based on six real people who had been wrongfully convicted and later exonerated by the Ohio Innocence Project (OIP). In addition to those real people, other characters are less closely based on individuals. There is a single prosecutor, who serves as the prosecutor for all of the cases, as well as a single defense attorney and one student researcher from the OIP, Alesha.

In order of vocal appearance:

Role	Voice type	Premiere cast, July 22, 2019 (Conductor: John Morris Russell)
Prosecutor	baritone	Joseph Lattanzi
Defense Attorney	tenor	Samuel Levine
Nancy Smith, an exoneree	mezzo-soprano	Maria Miller
Derrick Wheatt, an exoneree	baritone	Sankara Harouna
Eugene Johnson, an exoneree	bass-baritone	Miles Wilson-Toliver
Laurese Glover, an exoneree	tenor	Terrence Chin-Loy
Clarence Elkins, an exoneree	tenor	Thomas J. Capobianco
Rickey Jackson, an exoneree	baritone	Eric Shane
Alesha, law student working on the Ohio Innocence Project; Ensemble	soprano	Victoria Okafor
Derrick Wheatt's mother, Ensemble	mezzo-soprano	Deborah Nansteel
Earl Mann, Ensemble	baritone	Morgan Smith
Earl Mann's Cellmate, Ensemble	baritone	Joseph Parrish

The chorus was drawn from Cincinnati's Young Professionals Choral Collective.

== Synopsis ==
The plot of the opera follows six people wrongfully-convicted and eventually exonerated as well as the work of the lawyers and law students working on their cases. The Prosecuting Attorney and the Defense Attorney are both based in part on Mark Godsey, co-founder of the Ohio Innocence Project, at different stages of his career. The prosecutor, representing a younger Godsey (who had been a prosecutor for the Southern District of New York), extolls his role in keeping people safe, while the defense attorney reflect an older Godsey's views on the fallibility of the judicial system. Clarence Elkins was convicted of two rapes and a murder after a "flimsy identification". Nancy Smith, a bus driver for Head Start, was convicted on child sexual abuse charges. Laurese Glover, Derrick Wheatt, and Eugene Johnson, known as the East Cleveland Three, were convicted on the basis of tainted evidence and misidentification by an eyewitness; they served 20 years in prison. Rickey Jackson served 39 years for a murder he did not commit, based on false testimony. The opera follows their stories from the time of the alleged crime, their time in prison, the work of the Ohio Innocence Project (represented through the character of Alesha), and their eventual release from prison.

== Critical reception ==
Blind Injustice opened to positive reviews in both local and national publications. The Wall Street Journal called it a "powerful piece of music theater." National Public Radio's Elizabeth Kramer said "the opera's overarching call for awareness can resonate with audiences universally." Seen and Heard International noted "Richards's potent music and Cote's hard-hitting words." Cincinnati City Beat called it a "masterpiece", and declared that the only flaw was the small seating capacity, saying that the opera's powerful message deserved a broader audience. Blind Injustice has received positive feature coverage on ABC News, the New York Times and The New Yorker, among other outlets.
