= David Cote (writer) =

American writer

- Born: December 22, 1969 (age 56); Gilmanton, New Hampshire, U.S.
- Occupations: Playwright, librettist, critic, reporter, editor
- Writing career
- Genres: Theater, opera, journalism, criticism
- Website: www.davidcote.com

David Cote (born December 22, 1969) is an American writer.

== Early years ==
Cote was born and adopted in Gilmanton, New Hampshire.

== Education ==
After kindergarten and middle school, Cote attended Gilford High School (GHS), graduating in 1988. At Gilford, he acted in drama club productions such as West Side Story, Up the Down Staircase and Macbeth. He edited GHS's newspaper and its literary journal.

He attended Bard College, graduating in 1992 with a Bachelor of Arts in Drama/Dance. While at Bard, he also studied early modern English literature, concentrating on Shakespeare's Henriad (Richard II, Henry IV Parts 1 and 2 and Henry V). Among his stage roles at Bard were Boris in Maxim Gorky's Children of the Sun; Len in Harold Pinter's The Dwarfs; Sganarelle in Molière's Dom Juan; Simon Bliss in Noël Coward's Hay Fever; and Second Lieutenant Ralph Clark in Timberlake Wertenbaker's Our Country's Good. In addition to acting, Cote studied voice, directing, and 20th-century drama. He wrote dramatic scenes and poetry as well as academic papers.

== Acting in New York City ==
After graduation, Cote moved to New York, where he joined Purgatorio Ink Theater, the company of his former Bard professor, Assurbanipal Babilla.

With Babilla and Purgatorio, Cote acted in several plays at notable Off-Off-Broadway venues: The Rise and Fall of H. M. Dick at P.S. 122; Suddenly Something Recklessly Gay or Cirque de Ca-Ca and All About Jeez or The Sacred Squirt, both at La MaMa E.T.C.; Homo Americanus at Bouwerie Lane Theatre; The Sisters Karamazov at One Dream Theatre; and Othello and the Circumcisèd Turk at the Vineyard Theatre. All productions were written, designed, and directed by Babilla. In 1998, Cote directed Babilla in his monologue, Something Something Über Alles (Das Jackpot) at the Emerging Collector on Second Avenue. The production ran for three months. It took part in the New York International Fringe Festival and had a limited run at the Kraine Theater in early 1999.

Throughout this period, Cote acted in work by various writers and directors associated with Richard Foreman's Ontological Hysteric Theater, housed in St. Mark's Church. He worked with writer-directors such as Robert Cucuzza (Be Emphatic!), DJ Mendel (Tom, Dick & Harry), Anne DeMare, Judy Elkan, and others.

In 1997, Cote played a Large Male Dwarf in Foreman's Pearls for Pigs. The production opened at Hartford Stage and toured France, Italy, Los Angeles, Portland, Dartmouth, and New York City. In 1999, he appeared in Richard Maxwell's Cowboys & Indians at Soho Rep and Cucuzza's Speed Freaks at the Ontological. Cucuzza later filmed Speed Freaks, and Cote reprised his role as dim-witted drug chef Karl.

== Career in arts journalism ==
In 1996, Cote co-founded and edited OFF, a journal for alternative theater with actor and graphics designer Jenny Woodward. This free zine dedicated to experimental, off-off theater was distributed to theaters mostly below 14th Street. It continued until 1998. In 1998–1999, Cote edited EdgeNY, a free indie magazine also devoted to off-off theater. From 1999 to 2000, he worked as theater editor at the national arts listings site CultureFinder.com.

In August 2000, Cote became staff theater writer at Time Out New York. He wrote reviews, listings, previews, and other reporting for the weekly magazine. In 2003, he became the theater editor and chief drama critic. He reviewed a wide range of plays, musicals, and experimental pieces from Broadway to Off-Off-Broadway. Cote left Time Out in April 2017. To date, he is the longest-serving theater editor and chief drama critic of the magazine. As a critic and reporter, he freelances for The Village Voice, What Should We Do?, IN New York and other places.

Over the years, his reporting and reviews have appeared in The New York Times, American Theatre, Opera News, The Guardian, The Times (UK), Slate and elsewhere. In 2004, he began as a regular contributing critic on NY1's weekend theater program, On Stage.

== Career as playwright and opera librettist ==
After more than a decade of acting and journalism, Cote decided to branch into more creative writing areas, namely, plays and opera libretti. Since 2007, he has been writing on commission for various theater and opera companies. His world premieres to date include three operas, a song cycle, and a monodrama. In addition, his plays and other libretti have had numerous readings and workshops.

== Personal life ==
In 2011, Cote married Katherine Kellgren, the audiobook narrator and winner of 13 Audie Awards, including four for Best Female Narrator. They lived in Manhattan until Kellgren died at age 48 in 2018.

== Selected awards and recognition ==
Cote's work has been generously supported by the MAP Fund and the Anna Sosenko Assist Trust. In 2009, he won a fellowship to the MacDowell Colony. His plays and operas have been commissioned, developed or produced by Gingold Theatrical Group, HERE, Beth Morrison Projects, Second Movement, Fort Worth Opera, Chicago Opera Theater, Cincinnati Opera, American Opera Projects, American Modern Ensemble, Austin Chamber Ensemble, Nashville Opera and others.

== Theater books ==
Cote has written three books about the making of hit Broadway musicals. They are Wicked: The Grimmerie (2005); Jersey Boys (2007); and Spring Awakening: In the Flesh (2008).

== Essays for Best Plays Yearbook ==
Cote has written essays for the Best Plays Yearbook series on Shining City by Conor McPherson, Blackbird by David Harrower and The Receptionist by Adam Bock.

== Theatrical works ==
=== Plays ===
- Otherland
- Fear of Art

=== Opera libretti ===
- Blind Injustice (music by Scott Davenport Richards)
- Fade (music by Stefan Weisman)
- Robeson (music by Scott Davenport Richards)
- The Scarlet Ibis (music by Stefan Weisman)
- Three Way, three one-act operas (music by Robert Paterson)

=== Song cycles ===
- In Real Life (music by Robert Paterson)

=== Texts for chorus ===
- Did You Hear? (music by Robert Paterson)
- Snow Day (music by Robert Paterson)

=== Other lyrical work ===
- Invitation to a Die-In (baritone and orchestra) (music by Nkeiru Okoye)
