= Blind Injustice (book) =

Non-fiction book by Mark Godsey about wrongful imprisonment

Blind Injustice:A Former Prosecutor Exposes the Psychology and Politics of Wrongful Convictions
- First edition
- Author: Mark Godsey
- Language: English
- Genre: Nonfiction
- Published: 2017 (University of California Press)
- ISBN: 9780520287952

Blind Injustice is a nonfiction book by lawyer Mark Godsey. Godsey is the co-founder of the Ohio Innocence Project (OIP), which seeks to exonerate and overturn the convictions of people who have been wrongfully convicted. Drawing on Godsey's experience as a prosecutor for the Southern District of New York prior to his work at OIP, the book examines how the culture of the justice system is complicit in wrongful convictions. It was published in 2017 by the University of California Press.

== Synopsis ==
The book is part-memoir in which Godsey describes his personal journey from being a "hard-nosed prosecutor" to the co-founder of the Ohio Innocence Project. Godsey began teaching law in 2001, and was assigned to serve as the faculty supervisor for the Kentucky Innocence Project. He did not believe that innocent people were in prison, and thought that students were naive to try to prove the innocence of those who had been convicted.

The book's six main chapters each focus on one of the systematic flaws Godsey sees: "blind denial", "blind ambition", "blind bias", "blind memory", "blind intuition", and "blind tunnel vision". The two most frequent contributors to wrongful conviction are false eyewitness accounts and problems with forensic science. The book illustrates how these problems have led to wrongful convictions in cases taken up the by Ohio Innocence Project.

Godsey writes that judges, prosecutors, and police contribute to wrongful convictions by taking "unreasonable and intellectually dishonest positions" and that they operate "under a bureaucratic fog of denial". He sees the system as routinely dehumanizing suspects in the eyes of prosecutors.

=== Blind Denial ===
In the chapter on "blind denial", Godsey addresses prosecutors' and law enforcement's psychological denial of their fallibility and the possibility that they could have made a mistake. He gives the example of Clarence Elkins, who was convicted on rape, assault, and murder charges in 1998. He was initially convicted on the basis of "looking like" the attacker, despite an alibi and an absence of physical evidence. When later DNA testing showed that he was not the source of the skin cells and semen found at the crime scene, prosecutors put forth improbable theories to explain why Elkins must still be guilty. Godsey uses this example to illustrate the judicial system's resistance to new evidence and the possibility of having been wrong.

=== Blind Ambition ===
The chapter "blind ambition" addresses the political factors affecting judges and prosecutor. Godsey writes that elected judges know that a "tough on crime" approach wins votes, leading some judges to lean on a record of toughness rather than fairness. Here, Godsey cites the case of Chris Bennett, who was convicted of vehicular manslaughter and sought to overturn the conviction based on evidence that he was a passenger rather than the driver of the car involved in an accident. In the cases of both Clarence Elkins and Chris Bennett, local prosecutors and judges denied the validity of new evidence, and the convictions were over turned at the state level. Godsey sees these local officials' unwillingness to overturn a conviction as a symptom of the political system that incentivizes conviction over exoneration.

=== Blind Bias ===
The bias Godsey refers to in the "Blind Bias" chapter is confirmation bias, the tendency of people to favor evidence that supports what they already believe. In this chapter, he notes that prosecutors often tell forensic specialists what the prosecutors want to find or believe to be correct; that foreknowledge undercuts the scientific method and primes the forensic experts to come to particular conclusions.

=== Blind Memory ===
The "blind memory" chapter addresses the fallibility of human memory and memory's susceptibility to the power of suggestion. Citing memory expert Elizabeth Loftus, he notes that human memory is subject to constant subconscious editing that changes the details of what is remembered, while leaving the thinker unaware of how the memory has changed over time. He gives the example of John Jerome White, who was convicted of rape, and who served twenty-two years before being exonerated by DNA evidence. White did not match the description of the perpetrator that the victim gave to police, but his face was in the first batch of photos shown to the victim, and she selected his as a possible culprit. When the victim was then shown a lineup of possible suspects, she again selected White as the perpetrator. DNA evidence later showed that the probable actual perpetrator was in the lineup as well, but was not selected. Godsey hypothesizes that when the victim was initially shown an array of photographs and selected White, White replaced the actual attacker in her memory. Similarly, Godsey notes a study showing that police interrogation techniques can cause a person to form new artificial memories. Godsey contends that human memory is highly fallible, but is treated as evidence all the same.

=== Blind Intuition ===
In the "blind intuition" chapter, Godsey discusses human's belief in their ability to correctly identify deceptive behavior. He cites the case of David Ayers, who spent twelve years in prison before his murder conviction was overturned. When he sued the detectives whose testimony had led to his wrongful conviction, one claimed to have never arrested an innocent person in her career, saying that she was "a human lie detector, with no rate of error." Ayers won his suit.

=== Blind Tunnel Vision ===
In the chapter on "blind tunnel vision", Godsey describes a prosecutorial penchant for becoming attached to one interpretation of events and being unwilling to consider alternatives. He returns to the case of Clarence Elkins and the prosecutor's adherence to a version of events not supported by a preponderance of evidence. He notes that while Elkins spent seven and half years in jail for crimes he did not commit, the actual perpetrator remained free for several years and committed further crimes before being caught. Thus, the prosecutor's attachment to an incorrect version of events led to both Elkins's unjust imprisonment and to several additional crimes.

=== Conclusion ===
In a final chapter entitled "Seeing and Accepting Human Limitations", Godsey argues that knowing the human propensities outlined in the preceding chapters, the justice system needs to be reformed to limit the impact of these failings. He writes that greater care in handling witnesses and more comprehensive use of video recording to capture interrogations from beginning to end can help fight the "massive disaster" of wrongful convictions.

== Reception ==
Blind Injustice was published in 2017 and received several positive reviews, largely in politically progressive media outlets. Rutgers University law professor George C. Thomas III wrote an extensive review for the Ohio State Journal of Criminal Law; he wrote "Godsey’s book is splendid. Everyone who cares the least bit about justice must read it." The Progressive listed it as one of "Our favorite books of 2017". A review in Salon described the book as "compelling" and called Godsey "one of the heroes we need now more than ever" for his work exonerating the wrongfully imprisoned.

== Related work ==
The book served as the basis for the 2019 opera of the same title, which was developed as a collaboration between the Ohio Innocence Project, the Young Professionals Choral Collective in Cincinnati, and the Cincinnati Opera.
