= Douglas J. Cuomo =

American classical composer

Douglas J. Cuomo (born February 13, 1958) is an American composer of contemporary classical music and music for television.

== Biography ==
Born in Tucson, Arizona, raised in the San Francisco Bay Area and Amherst, Massachusetts, Douglas J. Cuomo began playing the trumpet in grade school and switched to guitar at the age of 12. While still in high school he studied with jazz musicians Max Roach and Archie Shepp at the University of Massachusetts Amherst.

He began his professional musical career at the age of 18, touring the country with a Las Vegas show band. He alternated years of college with years on the road as a guitarist, studying jazz, world music and ethnomusicology at Wesleyan University in Connecticut. He completed his undergraduate studies at the University of Miami (Coral Gables) with a degree in jazz performance.

Cuomo's first work to garner significant public notice was Atomic Opera, which was performed at the Ohio Theatre in downtown New York City. The New York Times wrote that Cuomo's "elegiac and eerie" score "blends electronically treated classical fragments and vintage kitsch, suggests the breaking down and reconstitution of matter into something ominous and uncontrollable." After Atomic Opera, he scored fifteen productions for the Roundabout Theatre, including The Women, Design For Living, Hamlet, The Visit, and the Tony Award-winning Anna Christie.

In television, Cuomo has scored over 120 episodes for Homicide: Life on the Street. His credits include numerous series, movies, and documentaries for CBS, NBC, ABC, HBO and VH1, among others. He has also scored a number of independent films, including Revolution #9, Terrorists, and Crazy Love, featuring pianist Billy Childs and trumpeter Chris Botti. Cuomo also composed the theme to Sex and the City (HBO), praised by The New Yorker magazine for its "unusual, edgy salsa flavor" and the saxophone quartet music that opens and closes Now with Bill Moyers (PBS).

Cuomo's collaborators have included the string quartet Ethel, the PRISM saxophone quartet, the vocal group Anonymous 4, violinist Mark Feldman, trumpeters Frank London and Steven Bernstein, pianists Oscar Hernandez and Brian Mitchell, drummers Robby Ameen and Roberto Juan Rodríguez, tabla player Badal Roy, guitarists Mark Stewart and Dave Fuzinski and many others.

In 2008 Cuomo composed Arjuna’s Dilemma, an 80-minute opera-oratorio incorporating an Indian vocalist, a classically trained tenor, a four-member female chorus, a tabla player, an improvising tenor saxophonist, and a ten-piece chamber ensemble. Arjuna’s Dilemma has been produced by the Music-Theatre Group, and was performed at BAM's Next Wave Festival. The New York Times described Arjuna's Dilemma as "an opera with an appealing and unabashedly eclectic score." A recording of Arjuna’s Dilemma, performed by artists including Indian singer Amit Chatterjee, members of Anonymous 4 and the Philip Glass Ensemble, tenor Tony Boutté, Badal Roy, Ethel, pianist Kathleen Supové, and bassist Robert Black of the Bang on a Can All Stars, was released on Innova Recordings.

In addition to Arjuna’s Dilemma, his concert works include a Kyrie for And on Earth, Peace (2007) commissioned by the vocal ensemble Chanticleer, premiered by the group at the Temple of Dendur at the Metropolitan Museum of Art, and recorded on Warner Music; and Fortune for The Young People's Chorus under the direction of Francisco Nunez. Cuomo composed Only Breath for cello and electronics, commissioned by Maya Beiser for an evening-length program titled Provenance, performed at the Arts & Ideas Festival, the Ravinia Festival, and Carnegie Hall. Other works include A Winter's Journey, a setting of Wilhelm Müller's text for Schubert's Winterreise song cycle, scored for mezzo-soprano, trumpet, cello, and electronics. In 2010, his work, Black Diamond Express Train to Hell, a double concerto for sampler, cellist Maya Beiser, and orchestra premiered at Carnegie Hall's Zankel Hall with the American Composers Orchestra.

In 2013, Cuomo's opera, Doubt, based on the John Patrick Shanley play and movie, was premiered at Minnesota Opera. The libretto was written by Mr. Shanley and the cast included Denyce Graves, Christine Brewer, Matthew Worth, and Adriana Zabala. Associated Press called the opera "a success," citing the "gripping" theater experience and the "clearly talented" Cuomo's "ear for subtle dissonance" and "inventive orchestrations."

The Pittsburgh Opera mounted the world premiere of his monodrama for tenor, Savage Winter (originally titled Ashes and Snow), in 2018, with Eric Ferring as the protagonist and Jonathan Moore directing.

== Awards ==
Cuomo has received fellowships and grants from the National Endowment for the Arts, Mabou Mines, Meet the Composer, the Blue Mountain Center, the MacDowell Colony, and the Hermitage Artist Retreat, and has received three BMI Film & TV Awards. His theme for Sex and the City was chosen by TV Guide as one of the top 50 television themes of all time.

Douglas J. Cuomo's compositions are published by Schott Music.
