= Christine Brewer =

American soprano opera singer

Christine Brewer (born October 26, 1955), is an American soprano opera singer.

== Biography ==
Brewer grew up in the Mississippi River town of Grand Tower, Illinois. She attended McKendree University in Lebanon, Illinois and concentrated on music education. She was a music teacher for several years before embarking on a professional music performing career.

She began her career in St. Louis, Missouri with the Saint Louis Symphony Chorus. She auditioned in 1981 for the chorus of Opera Theatre of Saint Louis (OTSL), in the start of her career in opera. Her first OTSL work was in the chorus of The Beggar's Opera in 1982. Her first major role with OTSL was as Ellen Orford in Peter Grimes in 1990.

In 1989, she participated in a masterclass with Birgit Nilsson and was one of the 10 winners of the National Council auditions sponsored by the Metropolitan Opera. While her daughter Elisabeth was in school during the academic year, Brewer deliberately limited her work in staged opera productions. She returned more actively to the opera stage after her daughter's high school graduation. She began to accept roles including a debut in the title role of Richard Strauss's Ariadne auf Naxos at the Metropolitan Opera in 2003, which has become a signature role for Brewer.

Brewer is most famous for her interpretations of roles by Wagner, Strauss and Britten including Isolde, Ariadne, Färberin (Die Frau ohne Schatten), Ellen Orford (Peter Grimes) and Queen Elizabeth I (Gloriana). She made her debut at the San Francisco Opera in 2006 singing the title role in Beethoven's Fidelio and returned the following season singing the role of Isolde in Tristan und Isolde.

Brewer is a regular featured singer at The Proms and the Wigmore Hall.

In late March 2009, Brewer had to withdraw from the complete Ring cycle at the Metropolitan Opera because of a knee injury.

In August 2012, Ms Brewer sang the same program that her mentor Birgit Nilsson sang at the opening of the Concert Hall at the Sydney Opera House in Sydney, New South Wales, Australia 40 years before. It was an all-Wagner program, three performances with the Sydney Symphony Orchestra playing and conducted by Simone Young.

In January 2013, Brewer created the role of Sister Aloysius in the world premiere of Douglas Cuomo's opera Doubt at the Minnesota Opera.

BBC Music Magazine in April 2007 named her one of the top 20 sopranos of the 20th century.

She continues to work with young students in the sixth-grade classroom at Marissa, Illinois where she had formerly taught music, in an outreach program in conjunction with the Saint Louis Symphony Orchestra. She currently lives in Lebanon, Illinois, with her husband Ross Brewer, a retired social studies teacher.

== Recordings ==
Brewer has made a number of recordings, which include:

- Two contributions to Hyperion's Schubert series with pianist Graham Johnson
- One CD in Hyperion's Richard Strauss series with pianist Roger Vignoles
- Echoes of Nightingales encores by British and American composers
- Two recital recordings produced and released by OTSL: (a) "Saint Louis Woman”, (b) “Music for a While” with pianist Kirt Pavitt
- Mahler's Eighth Symphony with Sir Simon Rattle and the City of Birmingham Symphony Orchestra (EMI)
- Mozart's Don Giovanni with Sir Charles Mackerras and the Scottish Chamber Orchestra (Telarc)
- Richard Strauss’s Four Last Songs, Wagner's "Liebestod" from Tristan und Isolde
- Mozart’s Requiem with Donald Runnicles and the Atlanta Symphony Orchestra (Telarc)
- Fidelio (in German) with Sir Colin Davis and the London Symphony Orchestra (LSO Live)
- Barber’s Vanessa (Chandos) with the BBC Symphony Orchestra, conducted by Leonard Slatkin
- William Bolcom's Songs of Innocence and Experience (Naxos), conducted by Leonard Slatkin
- Fidelio (in English) and “Great Operatic Arias” (Chandos) with the London Philharmonic and David Parry
- Tristan und Isolde with Donald Runnicles and the BBC Symphony Orchestra (Warner Classics)
- Britten's War Requiem with the London Philharmonic Orchestra and Kurt Masur (LPO Live)

Brewer was honored at the 48th Annual Grammy Awards for Best Choral Performance and Best Classical Album for her work on Bolcom's Songs of Innocence and Experience.
