= Evans Mirageas =

Music Icon

- Born: 1954 (age 71–72); Ann Arbor, Michigan, U.S.
- Education: University of Michigan
- Occupations: Artistic consultant and record producer
- Website: http://www.evansmirageas.com/

Evans Mirageas (born 1954) is an American classical music consultant and producer, and currently the Harry T. Wilks Artistic Director at Cincinnati Opera and the former vice president for Artistic Planning at the Atlanta Symphony Orchestra.

Mirageas was born in Ann Arbor, Michigan, United States and graduated from the University of Michigan in 1976. He began his career hosting evening classical music hours and opera night programs in about 1973 at WUOM/WVGR, the University of Michigan radio stations in Ann Arbor and Grand Rapids Michigan. Since then, he's worked for the WFMT radio station in Chicago, as the Artistic Administrator to Seiji Ozawa at the Boston Symphony, and as the Senior Vice President of Artists and Repertoire for the Decca Record Company in London. At Decca, he supervised the recordings of conductors Sir Georg Solti, Christoph von Dohnanyi, Riccardo Chailly, and others, as well as singers Luciano Pavarotti, Cecilia Bartoli, Bryn Terfel, Renée Fleming, Angela Gheorghiu, Plácido Domingo, Thomas Hampson, Ben Heppner, René Pape, Karita Mattila, Barbara Bonney, and more.

He currently runs his own classical music consulting firm called Evans Mirageas Consulting.
