= Doubt (opera) =

American opera by Douglas J. Cuomo

- Opera by Douglas J. Cuomo
- Librettist: John Patrick Shanley
- Language: English
- Based on: Doubt: A Parable
- Premiere: 26 January 2013; Minnesota Opera

Doubt is an American opera in two acts by Douglas J. Cuomo to a libretto by John Patrick Shanley. It is an adaptation of Shanley's Pulitzer-Prize-winning 2004 play of the same title, which had been made into an Oscar-nominated 2008 film. Minnesota Opera commissioned the work and produced its premiere in 2013 at the Ordway Center for the Performing Arts. Conducted by Christopher Franklin and directed by Kevin Newbury, the cast featured Christine Brewer as Sister Aloysius (soprano), Adriana Zabala as Sister James (mezzo-soprano), Matthew Worth as Father Flynn (baritone), Denyce Graves as Mrs. Miller (mezzo-soprano), and Julius Andrews as Donald Miller.

A new chamber version, commissioned by Opera Parallèle, premiered in San Francisco in 2026.

== Recording ==
Doubt premiered on PBS Great Performances in January 2019.
