= Robin Guarino =

American film director

Robin Guarino (born April 3, 1960) is an opera and film director. She has directed operas such as The Marriage of Figaro, Don Giovanni, Lohengrin, Così fan tutte, and The Magic Flute at the Metropolitan Opera. She has directed at Seattle Opera, Glimmerglass Opera, Chautauqua Opera, Virginia Opera, and Wolf Trap Opera. She continues to direct, most recently L'etoile and The Marriage of Figaro for the Wolf Trap Opera Festival, La Calisto, The Magic Flute and Iphigénie en Aulide for Juilliard Opera Center, and at Gotham Chamber Opera, Il Signor Bruschino. She previously held the J. Ralph Corbett Distinguished Chair in Opera at the University of Cincinnati College-Conservatory of Music.

A selective list of opera productions directed by Robin Guarino can be found below:

- 2004: Die schwarze Spinne (1935) by Heinrich Sutermeister, The Abrons Arts Center
- 2007: Il signor Bruschino (1813) by Gioachino Rossini, The Abrons Arts Center
- 2008: Aida (1871) by Giuseppe Verdi, Seattle Opera
- 2013: Falstaff (1892) by Verdi, IU The Jacobs School
- 2014: Così fan tutte (1789) by Mozart, The Metropolitan Opera
