= Sister James =

Sister James can refer to:

- "Sister James", a 1973 song by Nino Tempo and 5th Ave. Sax
- Sister Marita James, a character in the 2004 play Doubt: A Parable and the 2008 movie Doubt
- James Charles, an American internet personality and makeup artist who served as the first male CoverGirl spokesperson
