= 59th Tony Awards =

2005 US theatrical awards ceremony

- Official poster for the 59th annual Tony Awards
- Date: June 5, 2005
- Location: Radio City Music Hall, New York City, New York
- Hosted by: Hugh Jackman

Highlights
- Most wins: The Light in the Piazza (6)
- Most nominations: Spamalot (14)
- Website: tonyawards.com

Television/radio coverage
- Network: CBS
- Viewership: 6.5 million
- Produced by: Ricky Kirshner; Glenn Weiss
- Directed by: Glenn Weiss

The 59th Annual Tony Awards ceremony was held on June 5, 2005 at Radio City Music Hall and broadcast by CBS television. Hugh Jackman hosted for the third time in a row.

This was the first year the craft category awards (costume, scenic, lighting) were divided into plays and musicals.

== Eligibility ==
Shows that opened on Broadway during the 2004–05 season before May 5, 2005 are eligible.

Original plays

- Brooklyn Boy
- Democracy
- Doubt
- Gem of the Ocean
- The Pillowman

Original musicals

- All Shook Up
- Brooklyn
- Chitty Chitty Bang Bang
- Dirty Rotten Scoundrels
- Dracula, the Musical
- The Frogs
- Good Vibrations
- The Light in the Piazza
- Little Women
- Monty Python’s Spamalot
- The 25th Annual Putnam County Spelling Bee

Play revivals

- After the Fall
- The Glass Menagerie
- Glengarry Glen Ross
- Julius Caesar
- 'night, Mother
- On Golden Pond
- Reckless
- The Rivals
- Sight Unseen
- Steel Magnolias
- A Streetcar Named Desire
- Twelve Angry Men
- Who's Afraid of Virginia Woolf?

Musical revivals

- La Cage aux Folles
- Pacific Overtures
- Sweet Charity

== The ceremony ==
For the opening number Bernadette Peters sang "Another Op’nin’ Another Show" from Kiss Me, Kate, which was followed by a video montage of the musicals that opened during the 2004-2005 season, as well as short excerpts of those performing that evening. In other special performances, Hugh Jackman sang and danced in a tribute to songs about dancing and Aretha Franklin and Hugh Jackman performed a duet of "Somewhere" from West Side Story.

Laura Linney gave a tribute to the late Arthur Miller and Jesse L. Martin and the cast of Chicago performed "Razzle Dazzle" in memory of Jerry Orbach and Fred Ebb.

The award presenters included: Angela Bassett, Matthew Broderick, Don Cheadle, Sally Field, Harvey Fierstein, Anne Hathaway, Nathan Lane, Sandra Oh, James Earl Jones, Bernadette Peters, and Chita Rivera.

=== Performances ===
New musicals

- Dirty Rotten Scoundrels: Norbert Leo Butz, John Lithgow and members of the company performed "Great Big Stuff".
- The Light in the Piazza: Victoria Clark and Kelli O'Hara with Matthew Morrison and members of the company performed "Statues and Stories".
- The 25th Annual Putnam County Spelling Bee: The company, joined by Al Sharpton, performed the title song and "Prayer of the Comfort Counselor."
- Monty Python's Spamalot: Sara Ramirez and Tim Curry with the voice of John Cleese performed "Find Your Grail" with the company.

Revivals

- Sweet Charity: The company did a medley from the show. The female chorus performed "Hey, Big Spender" and Christina Applegate performed 'If My Friends Could See Me Now' and 'I'm a Brass Band'
- La Cage aux Folles: Gary Beach and the company performed the title song.

== Winners and nominees ==
The nominees were announced on May 10, 2005 by Alan Cumming, Lynn Redgrave, Kate Burton and Brian Stokes Mitchell. Monty Python's Spamalot received 14 nominations, the most of any production at the time, followed by Dirty Rotten Scoundrels and The Light in the Piazza with 11 nominations each.

Source:Playbill

Winners are in bold

Best Play	Best Musical
**Doubt – John Patrick Shanley**; Democracy – Michael Frayn; Gem of the Ocean – August Wilson; The Pillowman – Martin McDonagh	**Monty Python's Spamalot**; Dirty Rotten Scoundrels; The Light in the Piazza; The 25th Annual Putnam County Spelling Bee
Best Revival of a Play	Best Revival of a Musical
**Glengarry Glen Ross**; On Golden Pond; Twelve Angry Men; Who's Afraid of Virginia Woolf?	**La Cage aux Folles**; Pacific Overtures; Sweet Charity
Best Performance by a Leading Actor in a Play	Best Performance by a Leading Actress in a Play
**Bill Irwin – Who's Afraid of Virginia Woolf? as George**; Billy Crudup – The Pillowman as Katurian; Brían F. O'Byrne – Doubt as Father Flynn; James Earl Jones – On Golden Pond as Norman Thayer, Jr.; Philip Bosco – Twelve Angry Men as Juror #3	**Cherry Jones – Doubt as Sister Aloysius Beauvier**; Phylicia Rashad – Gem of the Ocean as Aunt Ester; Mary-Louise Parker – Reckless as Rachel; Laura Linney – Sight Unseen as Patricia; Kathleen Turner – Who's Afraid of Virginia Woolf? as Martha
Best Performance by a Leading Actor in a Musical	Best Performance by a Leading Actress in a Musical
**Norbert Leo Butz – Dirty Rotten Scoundrels as Freddy Benson**; John Lithgow – Dirty Rotten Scoundrels as Lawrence Jameson; Gary Beach – La Cage aux Folles as Albin; Hank Azaria – Monty Python's Spamalot as Sir Lancelot, French Taunter, and Others; Tim Curry – Monty Python's Spamalot as King Arthur	**Victoria Clark – The Light in the Piazza as Margaret Johnson**; Erin Dilly – Chitty Chitty Bang Bang as Truly Scrumptious; Sherie Rene Scott – Dirty Rotten Scoundrels as Christine Colgate; Sutton Foster – Little Women as Josephine 'Jo' March; Christina Applegate – Sweet Charity as Charity Hope Valentine
Best Performance by a Featured Actor in a Play	Best Performance by a Featured Actress in a Play
**Liev Schreiber – Glengarry Glen Ross as Richard Roma**; Alan Alda – Glengarry Glen Ross as Levine; Gordon Clapp – Glengarry Glen Ross as Moss; Michael Stuhlbarg – The Pillowman as Michal; David Harbour – Who's Afraid of Virginia Woolf? as Nick	**Adriane Lenox – Doubt as Mrs. Muller**; Heather Goldenhersh – Doubt as Sister James; Dana Ivey – The Rivals as Mrs. Malaprop; Amy Ryan – A Streetcar Named Desire as Stella; Mireille Enos – Who's Afraid of Virginia Woolf? as Honey
Best Performance by a Featured Actor in a Musical	Best Performance by a Featured Actress in a Musical
**Dan Fogler – The 25th Annual Putnam County Spelling Bee as William Barfée**; Marc Kudisch – Chitty Chitty Bang Bang as Baron Bomburst; Matthew Morrison – The Light in the Piazza as Fabrizio Nacarelli; Michael McGrath – Monty Python's Spamalot as Patsy; Christopher Sieber – Monty Python's Spamalot as Sir Galahad	**Sara Ramirez – Monty Python's Spamalot as Lady of the Lake**; Jan Maxwell – Chitty Chitty Bang Bang as Baroness Bomburst; Joanna Gleason – Dirty Rotten Scoundrels as Muriel Eubanks; Kelli O'Hara – The Light in the Piazza as Clara Johnson; Celia Keenan-Bolger – The 25th Annual Putnam County Spelling Bee as Olive Ostrovsky
Best Book of a Musical	Best Original Score (Music and/or Lyrics) Written for the Theatre
**Rachel Sheinkin – The 25th Annual Putnam County Spelling Bee**; Jeffrey Lane – Dirty Rotten Scoundrels; Craig Lucas – The Light in the Piazza; Eric Idle – Monty Python's Spamalot	**The Light in the Piazza – Adam Guettel (music and lyrics)**; Dirty Rotten Scoundrels – David Yazbek (music and lyrics); Monty Python's Spamalot – John Du Prez and Eric Idle (music) and Idle (lyrics); The 25th Annual Putnam County Spelling Bee – William Finn (music and lyrics)
Best Scenic Design of a Play	Best Scenic Design of a Musical
**Scott Pask – The Pillowman**; John Lee Beatty – Doubt; David Gallo – Gem of the Ocean; Santo Loquasto – Glengarry Glen Ross	**Michael Yeargan – The Light in the Piazza**; Anthony Ward – Chitty Chitty Bang Bang; Tim Hatley – Monty Python's Spamalot; Rumi Matsui – Pacific Overtures
Best Costume Design of a Play	Best Costume Design of a Musical
**Jess Goldstein – The Rivals**; Constanza Romero – Gem of the Ocean; William Ivey Long – A Streetcar Named Desire; Jane Greenwood – Who's Afraid of Virginia Woolf?	**Catherine Zuber – The Light in the Piazza**; William Ivey Long – La Cage aux Folles; Tim Hatley – Monty Python's Spamalot; Junko Koshino – Pacific Overtures
Best Lighting Design of a Play	Best Lighting Design of a Musical
**Brian MacDevitt – The Pillowman**; Pat Collins – Doubt; Donald Holder – Gem of the Ocean; Donald Holder – A Streetcar Named Desire	**Christopher Akerlind – The Light in the Piazza**; Mark Henderson – Chitty Chitty Bang Bang; Kenneth Posner – Dirty Rotten Scoundrels; Hugh Vanstone – Monty Python's Spamalot
Best Direction of a Play	Best Direction of a Musical
**Doug Hughes – Doubt**; Joe Mantello – Glengarry Glen Ross; John Crowley – The Pillowman; Scott Ellis – Twelve Angry Men	**Mike Nichols – Monty Python's Spamalot**; Jack O'Brien – Dirty Rotten Scoundrels; Bartlett Sher – The Light in the Piazza; James Lapine – The 25th Annual Putnam County Spelling Bee
Best Choreography	Best Orchestrations
**Jerry Mitchell – La Cage aux Folles**; Jerry Mitchell – Dirty Rotten Scoundrels; Casey Nicholaw – Monty Python's Spamalot; Wayne Cilento – Sweet Charity	**Ted Sperling, Adam Guettel and Bruce Coughlin – The Light in the Piazza**; Harold Wheeler – Dirty Rotten Scoundrels; Larry Hochman – Monty Python's Spamalot; Jonathan Tunick – Pacific Overtures

== Special Tony Awards ==
Best Special Theatrical Event

- Billy Crystal 700 Sundays
- Dame Edna: Back with a Vengeance
- Mario Cantone: Laugh Whore
- Whoopi: The 20th Anniversary Show

Regional Theatre Tony Award

- Theatre de la Jeune Lune

Lifetime Achievement in the Theatre

- Edward Albee

Tony Honors for Excellence in Theatre

- Peter Neufeld
- Theatre Communications Group

== Multiple nominations and awards ==
These productions had multiple nominations:

- 14 nominations: Monty Python's Spamalot
- 11 nominations: Dirty Rotten Scoundrels and The Light in the Piazza
- 8 nominations: Doubt
- 6 nominations: Glengarry Glen Ross, The Pillowman, The 25th Annual Putnam County Spelling Bee and Who's Afraid of Virginia Woolf?
- 5 nominations: Chitty Chitty Bang Bang and Gem of the Ocean
- 4 nominations: La Cage aux Folles and Pacific Overtures
- 3 nominations: A Streetcar Named Desire, Sweet Charity and Twelve Angry Men
- 2 nominations: On Golden Pond and The Rivals

The following productions received multiple awards.

- 6 wins: The Light in the Piazza
- 4 wins: Doubt
- 3 wins: Monty Python's Spamalot
- 2 wins: Glengarry Glen Ross, La Cage aux Folles, The Pillowman and The 25th Annual Putnam County Spelling Bee

== In Memoriam ==
- Arthur Miller
- Christopher Reeve
- Marlon Brando
- Peter Foy
- Isabel Sanford
- Wally Harper
- Ossie Davis
- Onna White
- Howard Keel
- Peter Zeisler
- Eddie Albert
- Mel Gussow
- Virginia Capers
- Tom Dillon
- Cy Coleman
- Hildy Parks
- James H. Binger
- Alan King
- Janet Leigh
- Benjamin Mordecai
- Frank Gorshin
- John Raitt
- Howard Feuer
- Jerome Chodorov
- Fred Ebb
- Jerry Orbach

== See also ==
- Drama Desk Awards
- 2005 Laurence Olivier Awards – equivalent awards for West End theatre productions
- Obie Award
- New York Drama Critics' Circle
- Theatre World Award
- Lucille Lortel Awards
