= Dirty Story =

Dirty Story may refer to:

- Dirty Story (novel), a 1967 novel by Eric Ambler
- Dirty Story (play), a 2003 play by John Patrick Shanley

== See also ==
- The Dirty Story: The Best of Ol' Dirty Bastard , an album by Ol' Dirty Bastard.
