= Wild Mountain Thyme (film) =

2020 film by John Patrick Shanley

- Theatrical release poster
- Directed by: John Patrick Shanley
- Screenplay by: John Patrick Shanley
- Based on: Outside Mullingar by John Patrick Shanley
- Produced by: Anthony Bregman; Bradley Gallo; Michael A. Helfant; Martina Niland; Leslie Urdang; Alex Witchel
- Starring: Emily Blunt; Jamie Dornan; Jon Hamm; Dearbhla Molloy; Christopher Walken
- Cinematography: Stephen Goldblatt
- Edited by: Ian Blume
- Music by: Amelia Warner
- Production companies: Likely Story; Mar-Key Pictures; Port Pictures; HanWay Films; Fís Éireann/Screen Ireland; Amasia Entertainment
- Distributed by: Bleecker Street (United States); Lionsgate (United Kingdom)
- Release dates: 11 December 2020 (United States); 30 April 2021 (United Kingdom)
- Running time: 102 minutes
- Countries: United States; United Kingdom; Ireland
- Language: English
- Budget: $5.5 million
- Box office: $1.3 million

Wild Mountain Thyme is a 2020 romantic comedy film written and directed by John Patrick Shanley, based on his play Outside Mullingar. The film stars Emily Blunt, Jamie Dornan, Jon Hamm, Dearbhla Molloy and Christopher Walken.

Set in the Midlands of Ireland, misfit, 30-something farmers, Anthony and Rosemary have lived next to each other their whole lives. She has always been romantically interested in him, but the extremely shy Anthony finally awakens upon realising an American cousin could buy his life from under him.

Wild Mountain Thyme was released in the United States on 11 December 2020, by Bleecker Street, and in the United Kingdom on 30 April 2021, by Lionsgate via PVOD.

== Plot ==
In County Mayo, Ireland, two introverted misfits in their late 30s have lived in adjacent farms their whole lives. Rosemary Muldoon is in love with Anthony Reilly, but he seems to be indifferent.

In a flashback to their childhood, Anthony smells a flower and gets pollen on his nose. A girl laughs at him, so Rosemary pushes her in anger. Anthony, in turn, pushes Rosemary down. Seeing that she is upset, Rosemary's father plays the score to the ballet Swan Lake and tells her she is the white swan.

In the present, Anthony's father Tony claims his son is not sane. Anthony hears a voice in the fields that tells him "Go", though he does not reveal to where. Tony plans to disinherit Anthony, as he fears his misanthropic son will not marry and have children, leading to the end of the Reilly legacy.

Tony considers selling the farm to his nephew Adam, who is a New York City banker. Determined to inherit the farm, Anthony plans to propose to Rosemary with his late mother's ring, however he loses it outdoors. In the next days and weeks, he uses a metal detector to search for the ring in his free time.

At Tony's 75th birthday party, Adam arrives and flirts with Rosemary. She likes that Adam is direct and extroverted. He asks her to visit him in New York.

Rosemary's mother falls ill and dies. Tony decides to not sell to Adam, as it would ruin any chance of Anthony and Rosemary getting together. Not long after, Tony himself is on his death bed. He apologizes to Anthony for almost selling the farm, and they reconcile. Tony dies later that night.

Rosemary and Anthony now live alone. She tries to get closer to him, but he pushes her away and suggests she leave Ireland altogether. Rosemary flies to New York to visit Adam. They attend a performance of Swan Lake and have dinner, he also kisses her. Adam suggests Rosemary's longing for Anthony is making her miserable. She resists giving up hope.

After returning home, Rosemary finds Anthony on her property with his metal detector. She invites him to her house, where they fight about his difficulty accepting love. Anthony confesses a secret that ruined past relationships: he believes he is a honeybee. Rosemary reveals that she found Anthony's ring, and he finally proposes. He tells her the voice in the fields has been instructing him to go to her all along.

In the local pub, the two sing "Wild Mountain Thyme", and everyone (including their deceased parents) sings along.

== Cast ==
- Emily Blunt as Rosemary Muldoon
  - Abigail Coburn as young Rosemary Muldoon
- Jamie Dornan as Anthony Reilly
  - Darragh O'Kane as young Anthony Reilly
- Jon Hamm as Adam Kelly
- Christopher Walken as Tony Reilly
- Dearbhla Molloy as Aoife Muldoon
- Don Wycherley as Chris Muldoon
- Danielle Ryan as Maeve
- Barry McGovern as Cleary
- Lydia McGuinness as Eleanor

== Production ==
It was announced in May 2019 that John Patrick Shanley would write and direct an adaptation of his play Outside Mullingar, starring Jamie Dornan and Holliday Grainger By August, Emily Blunt, Jon Hamm, Christopher Walken and Dearbhla Molloy were added to the cast, with Blunt replacing Grainger in her role, and Molloy reprising her role from the play.

Filming began in Crossmolina, County Mayo, Ireland on 30 September 2019. It continued in Ballina, County Mayo and lasted over five weeks. Nephin was prominently displayed in the film.

=== Soundtrack ===
The soundtrack album was released digitally in December 2020, featuring Amelia Warner's score and an original song by Sinéad O'Connor.

== Release ==
It was released in the United States on 11 December 2020. The trailer was released on 10 November 2020, and was criticized for its inaccurate Irish accents and rehashing of hackneyed stereotypes. Shanley stated that no one would understand the characters if they sounded like his relatives spoke, and "you have to make the accent more accessible to a global audience".

It was the eighth-most rented film on FandangoNow in its debut weekend.

=== Home media ===
The film was released on DVD on 2 February 2021 with no Blu-ray or 4K UHD format.

== Reception ==
On review aggregator Rotten Tomatoes, 25% of 130 critics gave the film a positive review, with an average rating of 4.6/10. The website's critics consensus reads: "Fatally undermined by dodgy accents and a questionable story, Wild Mountain Thyme is a baffling misfire for a talented filmmaker and impressive cast." On Metacritic, it has a weighted average score of 45 out of 100 based on reviews from 24 critics, indicating "mixed or average reviews".

David Ehrlich of IndieWire gave the film a "C−" and wrote: "Shanley, whose script for Moonstruck suggests that he once had a slightly tighter handle on this sort of thing, brings his play 'Outside Mullingar' to the screen like he's trying to fill every close-up with enough whimsical enchantment to reach the back row of a Broadway theater. The lethal intensity of this effect cannot be overstated; the only logical explanation for what happened here is that someone planted a bomb in Shanley's editing bay and timed it to explode if any cut of Wild Mountain Thyme dipped below 50 kilohertz of cartoon Irish charm per minute." Kevin Maher, chief film critic of The Times, described the film's representation of Ireland as anti-Irish, calling it "representational fascism".

Mick LaSalle of the San Francisco Chronicle gave the film a positive review: "The gentle spirit of Wild Mountain Thyme envelops us early, to the extent that, midway through, even though there is very little left to resolve, we are in its spell." Patricia Danaher of the Irish Independent, while critical of the accents, thought it was "actually quite good" and "worth a watch". Donald Clarke of The Irish Times gave it 1 out of 5 and said "the accents certainly aren't so bad as many have suggested. But this is still stunningly regressive stuff."

The reveal that Anthony considers himself a bee was also ridiculed for its strangeness. Karen Han of Slate drew comparisons between the protagonists' identities and that of furries, and wondered if John Patrick Shanley intended to portray the characters as otherkin.
