= St. Anthony's Church (Bronx) =

Building in New York, United States

Coordinates: 40°50′15.89″N 73°52′6.55″W

The Church of St. Anthony
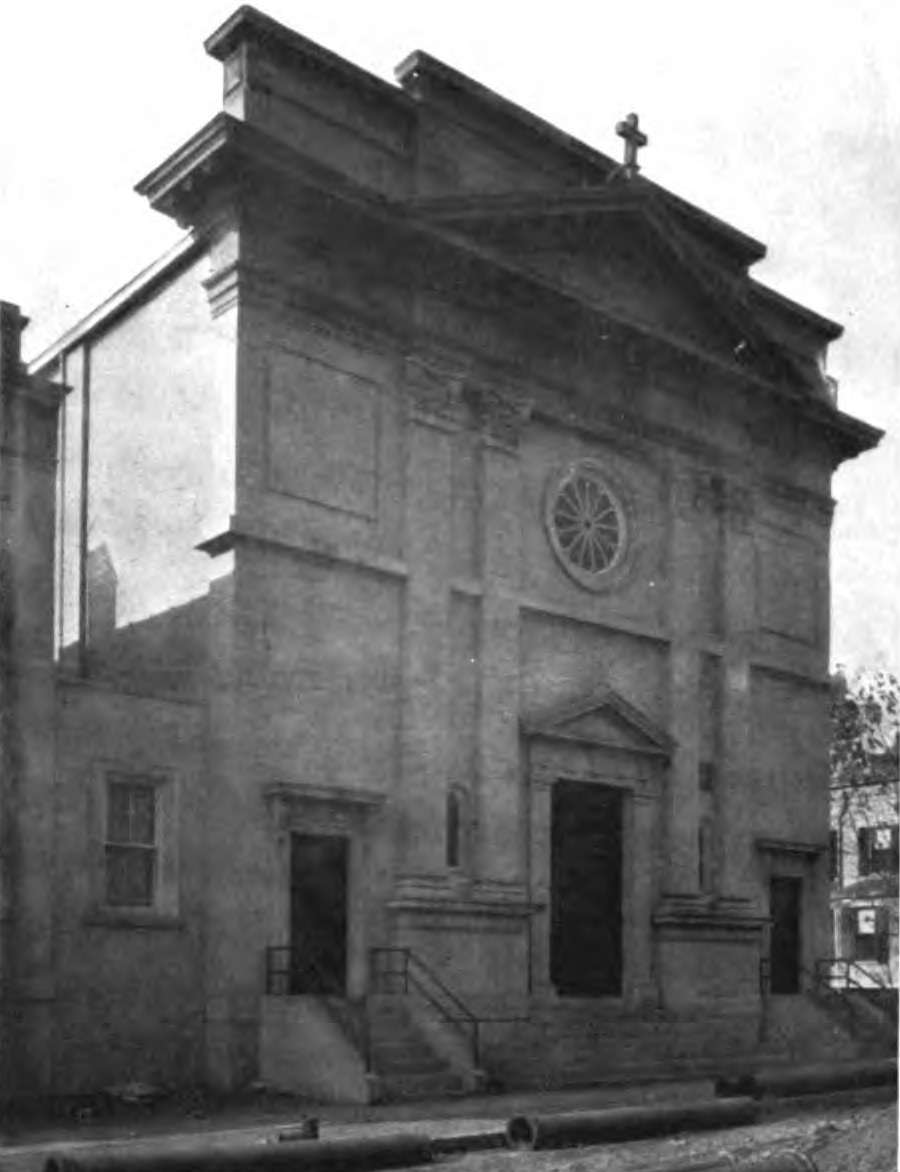
- The church as it appeared in 1914
- Interactive map of the The Church of St. Anthony area

General information
- Architectural style: Italianate
- Location: Van Nest, Bronx, New York City, United States
- Construction started: 1908
- Completed: 1909
- Cost: $75,000 (for 1909 church)
- Client: Roman Catholic Archdiocese of New York

The Church of St. Anthony is a Roman Catholic parish church under the authority of the Roman Catholic Archdiocese of New York, located at 1496 Commonwealth Avenue, Van Nest, Bronx, New York City, near the corner of Mansion Street and Commonwealth Avenue. Founded in 1908 as an Italian Personal Parish.

== St. Anthony ==
St. Anthony's was founded shortly after the IRT elevated train line was extended into a part of the Bronx undergoing development. It was established in 1908 as a personal parish for Italians by the Rev. Henry De Vivo. It is often referred to as St. Anthony, Van Nest, to distinguish it from St. Anthony of Padua's Church in neighboring Morrisania, Bronx. The present church building completed in 1909 at a cost of $75,000. "It is a brick building in the Roman style with a seating capacity of 500". On July 3, 1910, the church was dedicated by Archbishop Farley and the architect for the church was Mr. Sarrocino, a parishioner." . De Vivo was succeeded by the Rev. Pasquale Maltese in March 1912. In 1913, there were 149 baptisms, 29 marriages, 237 confirmations, 12,000 communions, and 300 in the Sunday-school. Rev. Antonio Burriesci was the assistant. That year the pastor, Rev. Pasquale Maltese, had reduced the parish debt of $70,000 to $63,000.

At the beginning of the Great Depression, the Stratton Flats development opened nearby which brought in a large group of Irish-Americans to the Parish. By 2008, the religious community was largely Hispanic.

=== Pastors ===
- Rev. Henry De Vivo (1908-1912)
- Rev. Pasquale Maltese (1912-1936)
- Msgr. Vincent J. Scully
- Msgr. Dennis P. Coleman
- Msgr. Robert A Ford
- Rev. Joseph J. Kelly
- Rev. Louis Anderson (Administrator 2016 -2019, Pastor 2019 - present).

=== St. Anthony's School ===
A school opened in 1931, staffed by the Sisters of Charity, at a time when a new development of apartment houses opened on former farmland. The current school building, located at 1750 Mansion Street, was built in 1956 and cost $350,000. When built, the new school building contained eight classrooms and a cafeteria, and its opening was officiated by Cardinal Spellman. ]

The school building facade was used as the filming location for the film Doubt (2008), written and directed by John Patrick Shanley, an alumnus of the school. The school closed permanently on June 18, 2013.

== Our Lady of Grace ==
Our Lady of Grace, on Bronxwood Avenue, was founded as an Italian personal parish in 1924 by Father Victor Bassi. For the first year, Rev. Bassi held Masses in two rented stores on White Plains Road until the first church building was dedicated on October 11, 1925. The present church dates from 1968. The statue of Mary and Jesus in front of the church was sculpted by Sister Angelica Ballan, and was originally outside Misericordia Hospital on East 233rd Street. The parish merged with St. Frances of Rome in 2015.

=== Pastors ===
- Rev. Victor Bassi, (1924 - )
- Monsignor Bonaventure Fillitti
- Monsignor John Rettagliata
