= Doubt (2008 film) =

2008 American drama film

- Theatrical release poster
- Directed by: John Patrick Shanley
- Screenplay by: John Patrick Shanley
- Based on: Doubt: A Parable by John Patrick Shanley
- Produced by: Scott Rudin; Mark Roybal
- Starring: Meryl Streep; Philip Seymour Hoffman; Amy Adams; Viola Davis
- Cinematography: Roger Deakins
- Edited by: Dylan Tichenor
- Music by: Howard Shore
- Production companies: Miramax Films; Scott Rudin Productions
- Distributed by: Miramax Films
- Release dates: October 30, 2008 (AFI Fest); December 12, 2008 (United States)
- Running time: 104 minutes
- Country: United States
- Language: English
- Budget: $20 million
- Box office: $51.7 million

Doubt is a 2008 American drama film written and directed by John Patrick Shanley, based on his Pulitzer Prize-winning and Tony Award-winning 2004 stage play Doubt: A Parable. Produced by Scott Rudin, the film takes place in a Catholic elementary school named for St. Nicholas. The film stars Meryl Streep, Philip Seymour Hoffman, Amy Adams, and Viola Davis.

Doubt premiered October 30, 2008, at the AFI Fest before being distributed by Miramax Films in limited release on December 12 and in wide release on December 25. Grossing $51.7 million against a budget of $20 million, the film received positive reviews. Streep, Hoffman, Adams, and Davis were highly praised for their performances, and all were nominated for Oscars at the 81st Academy Awards. Shanley was also nominated for Best Adapted Screenplay.

== Plot ==
In 1964 at a Catholic mass in The Bronx, Father Brendan Flynn gives a homily on doubt. The priest notes that like faith, it can be a unifying force. Sister Aloysius, the strict principal of the church's parish school, becomes concerned when she sees a boy pull away from Flynn in the courtyard. She orders her sisters be on alert for suspicious activity in the school.

Sister James, a young and naïve teacher, receives a request for Donald Miller, an altar boy and the school's only black student, to see Flynn in the rectory. He returns to class upset, and she smells alcohol on his breath. Later, she sees Flynn placing an undershirt in Donald's locker. Reporting her suspicions to Aloysius, she states that such suspicions disquiet her faith. Aloysius tells her that addressing wrongdoing causes the taking of a step away from God but in His service.

Aloysius and James invite Flynn into the office, supposedly to discuss the school's Christmas pageant. During their discussion, the two express drastically different perspectives on how the church should function regarding its working-class congregation. Flynn believes in relating to parishioners more actively through shared interests and community activities, but Aloysius maintains that clear boundaries, which are set by the clergy, facilitate the relationship with the parishioners.

Eventually, Aloysius brings up Donald by noting that his race causes him to be at risk of being singled out. She states that even Flynn gave him special treatment like their private meeting last week. He becomes defensive over her insinuations and eventually reveals he called Donald to the rectory because he had been caught drinking sacramental wine. Flynn had been keeping it quiet to protect Donald, but now that Aloysius has forced it out, he must be removed as an altar boy. James is greatly relieved to hear the explanation. Flynn's next homily is on the evils of gossip, obviously intended towards Sister Aloysius.

Unconvinced, Aloysius meets with Donald's mother regarding her suspicions. When describing the potential abusive relationship between Donald and Flynn, she is shocked by Mrs. Miller's seeming ambivalence. Finally, the mother tearfully admits that Donald is gay and fears his father would kill him if he knew. She describes her difficult position: since she is unable to protect her son from his father's violence, Flynn is the only male figure who has shown Donald any kindness. His position at the school shields him from bullies, and leaving the school now could compromise the better future that the school can give him. She begs Aloysius, if she wants to get her way, to remove Flynn instead of Donald. But her main desire lies for Donald to complete with good marks by June.

Knowing that she has spoken with Donald's mother, Flynn threatens to remove Aloysius from her position if she does not back down. She informs him that she contacted a nun from his last parish and discovered a history of past infringements. He demands to know what proof she has, and she admits that all she has is her certainty. Flynn accuses her of insubordination and acting outside her duties. She threatens that she will do whatever it takes to force him out even if it means being thrown out of the church herself.

Declaring his innocence, Flynn asks if she herself has never committed a mortal sin. Aloysius rejects his claims of innocence and threatens blackmail if he does not resign immediately. Acknowledging that his downfall would be inevitable if he ignores her threats, he maintains that he did nothing wrong and that her own certainty of wrongdoing is fallible. She demands Flynn request a transfer, which he does, delivering a final homily before departing.

Sometime later, Aloysius tells James that Flynn has since been appointed to a more prestigious position at a larger church. She reveals that she lied about contacting a nun at Flynn's former parish and reasons that if it were false, the ruse would not have worked. To her, his resignation is proof of his guilt. James, still believing in Flynn's innocence, is shocked by her lie, but Aloysius restates, "In the pursuit of wrongdoing, one steps away from God." However, she adds that doing so comes with a price. She then tearfully exclaims, "I have doubts... I have such doubts!"

== Cast ==
- Meryl Streep as Sister Aloysius Beauvier, the parish school principal
- Philip Seymour Hoffman as Father Brendan Flynn
- Amy Adams as Sister James, a history teacher at the school
- Viola Davis as Mrs. Miller, Donald Miller's mother
- Joseph Foster as Donald Miller, the school's first black student

The other sisters in the film include Alice Drummond as Sister Veronica, Audrie J. Neenan as Sister Raymond, and Helen Stenborg as Sister Teresa. The child actors who played the students of the school include Mike Roukis as William London, Lloyd Clay Brown as Jimmy Hurley, Frank Shanley as Kevin, Frank Dolce as Ralph, Paulie Litt as Tommy Conroy, Matthew Marvin as Raymond, Bridget Clark as Noreen Horan, Molly Chiffer as Sarah, and Lydia Jordan as Alice. The actors who played the other staff of the school include Susan Blommaert as Mrs. Carson, Carrie Preston as Christine Hurley, John Costelloe as Warren Hurley, Margery Beddow as Mrs. Shields, Marylouise Burke as Mrs. Deakins, and Jack O'Connell as Mr. McGuinn.

This would mark John A. Costelloe's final film role as he would die four days after the film's release.

== Production ==
Production began on December 1, 2007. The film, which is set in a Bronx Catholic school, was filmed in various areas of the Bronx, such as Parkchester, St. Anthony's Catholic School, and the 2nd floor chapel in the Founders Hall of College of Mount Saint Vincent, as well as Bedford-Stuyvesant, Brooklyn. The "garden" exterior scenes were shot at the historic Episcopal Church St. Luke in the Fields on Hudson Street in New York's Greenwich Village. The associated St. Luke's School was also heavily featured. The film is dedicated to Sister Margaret McEntee, a Sister of Charity who was Shanley's first-grade teacher and who served as a technical adviser for the movie, after whom Shanley modeled the character of Sister James.

Before Viola Davis was cast as Mrs. Miller, Audra McDonald, Sanaa Lathan, Taraji P. Henson, Sophie Okonedo and Adriane Lenox were all considered for the role.

=== Music ===
The film score was composed by Howard Shore.

== Reception ==
=== Critical response ===
On Rotten Tomatoes, the film has a 79% approval rating based on 221 reviews. The site's consensus reads, "Doubt succeeds on the strength of its top-notch cast, who successfully guide the film through the occasional narrative lull." Another review aggregator, Metacritic, gave the film a 70/100 approval rating based on 37 reviews, indicating "generally favorable" reviews.

Critic Manohla Dargis of The New York Times concluded that "the air is thick with paranoia in Doubt, but nowhere as thick, juicy, sustained or sustaining as Meryl Streep's performance." Streep's performance as the stern, intimidating and bold principal Sister Aloysius Beauvier was praised, as were Philip Seymour Hoffman and Amy Adams's performances.

The Observer's Philip French wrote, "Doubt is a provocative, pared-down work that in the theatre carried the subtitle 'A Parable', and it has four outstanding performances. At the centre are two of the finest actors alive, Meryl Streep and Philip Seymour Hoffman. Once again, they prove capable of transforming themselves, creating persuasive characters without adopting excessive make-up or a battery of eccentric mannerisms. They're supported by Amy Adams, who has several excellent scenes as Sister James, a young woman of transparent integrity, and by Viola Davis as Mrs Miller, a loving mother attempting to maintain her personal decency under intolerable conditions. Davis makes an indelible impression in her single scene."

Viola Davis's performance as Mrs. Miller was praised by critics; Salon declared that the character was acted with: "a near-miraculous level of believability ... Davis, in her small, one-scene role, is incredibly moving—I can barely remember a Davis performance where I haven't been moved ... [she] plays her character, an anxious, hardworking woman who's just trying to hold her life and family together, by holding everything close. She's not a fountain of emotion, dispensing broad expression or movement; instead, she keeps it all inside and lets us in".

NPR called Davis's acting in the film "the film's most wrenching performance ... the other [actors] argue strenuously and occasionally even eloquently, to ever-diminishing effect; Davis speaks plainly and quietly, and leaves [no] doubt that the moral high ground is a treacherous place to occupy in the real world".

Roger Ebert, who thought Davis's performance worthy of an Academy Award, gave the film four stars, his highest rating, and praised its "exact and merciless writing, powerful performances and timeless relevance. It causes us to start thinking with the first shot", he continued, "and we never stop". Ebert goes on to say, "The conflict between Aloysius and Flynn is the conflict between old and new, between status and change, between infallibility and uncertainty. And Shanley leaves us doubting."

The film and the cast earned numerous awards and nominations including five Academy Award nominations: for Best Actress for Streep, Best Supporting Actor for Hoffman, Best Supporting Actress for both Adams and Davis, and Best Adapted Screenplay for Shanley.

The scholar Daniel Cutrara, in his book on sex and religion in cinema, commented that the film works as a metaphor for worldwide uncertainty over priests accused of pedophilia—specifically through Father Flynn's resignation as an indication of guilt and then Sister Aloysius's subsequent doubt.

=== Accolades ===
Doubt received five Academy Award nominations in 2009, for its four main actors and Shanley's script. It was the fourth film to date—after My Man Godfrey (1936), I Remember Mama (1948), and Othello (1965)—to receive 4 acting noms without being nominated for Best Picture.

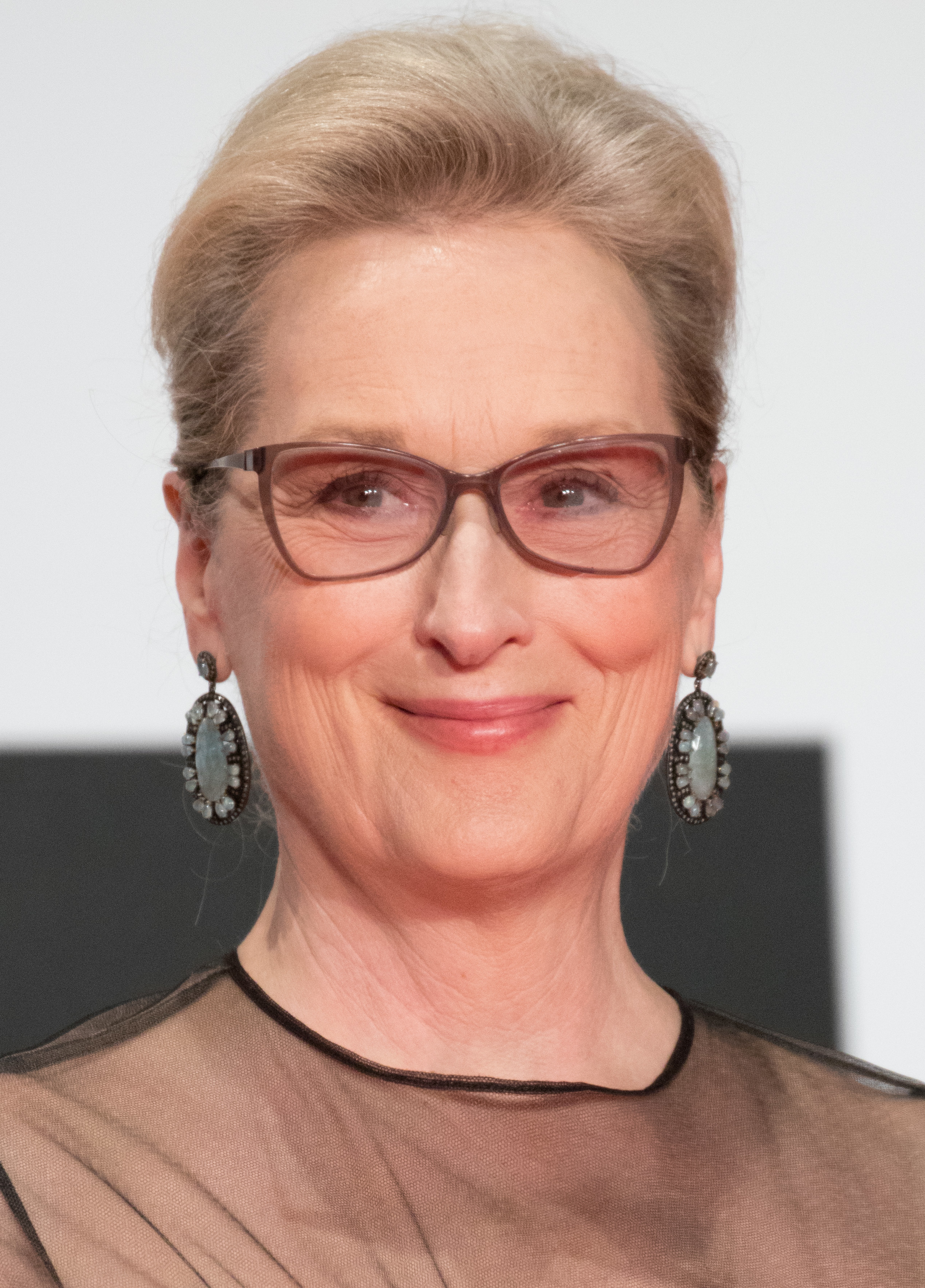
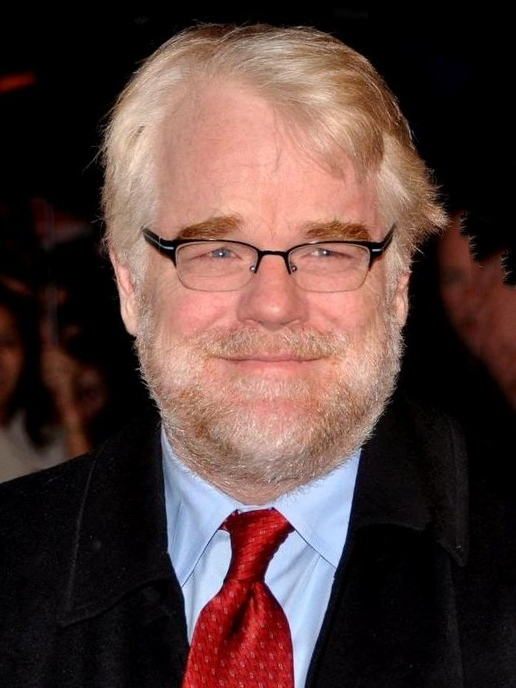
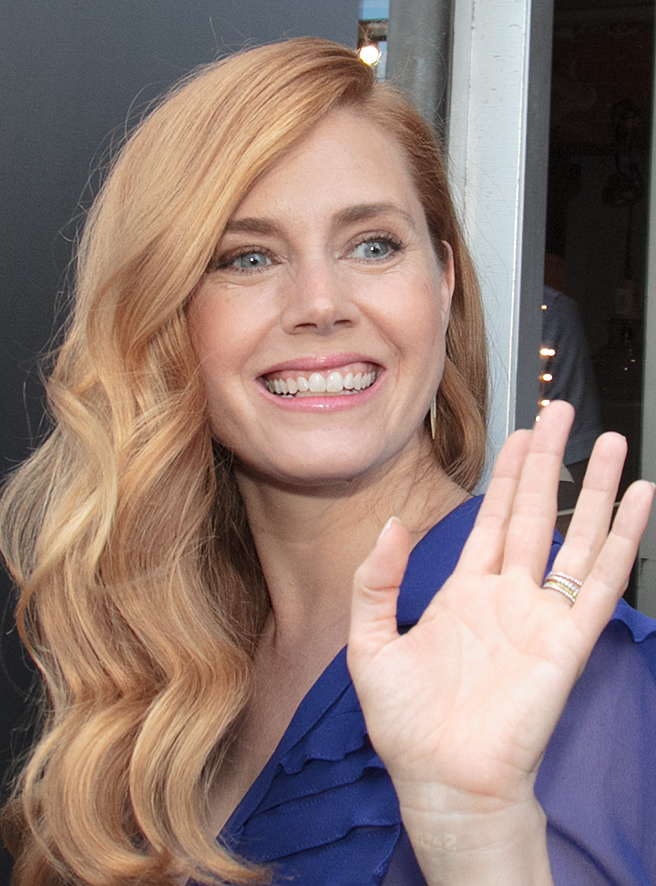
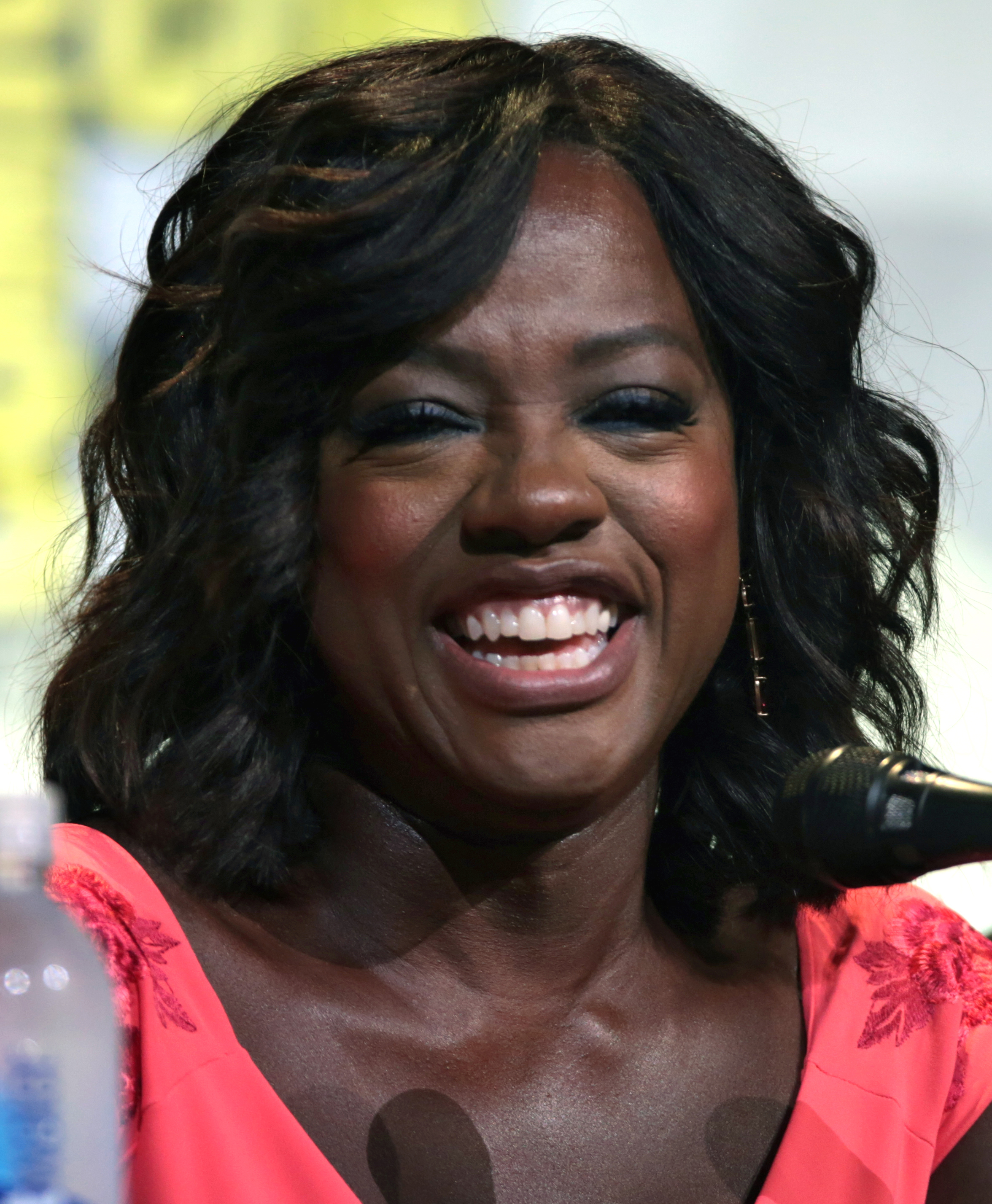
The performances of the entire main cast (clockwise, from top left: Meryl Streep, Philip Seymour Hoffman, Viola Davis, and Amy Adams) garnered widespread critical acclaim, earning them all Academy Award nominations for Best Actress, Best Supporting Actor, and the latter two for Best Supporting Actress respectively.

Award	Category	Recipient(s)	Result	Ref.
81st Academy Awards	Best Actress	Meryl Streep	Nominated	
81st Academy Awards	Best Supporting Actor	Philip Seymour Hoffman	Nominated	
81st Academy Awards	Best Supporting Actress	Amy Adams	Nominated	
81st Academy Awards	Best Supporting Actress	Viola Davis	Nominated	
81st Academy Awards	Best Adapted Screenplay	John Patrick Shanley	Nominated	
62nd British Academy Film Awards	Best Actress in a Leading Role	Meryl Streep	Nominated	
62nd British Academy Film Awards	Best Actor in a Supporting Role	Philip Seymour Hoffman	Nominated	
62nd British Academy Film Awards	Best Actress in a Supporting Role	Amy Adams	Nominated	
Chicago Film Critics Association Awards 2008	Best Actress	Meryl Streep	Nominated	
Chicago Film Critics Association Awards 2008	Best Supporting Actor	Philip Seymour Hoffman	Nominated	
Chicago Film Critics Association Awards 2008	Best Supporting Actress	Amy Adams	Nominated	
Chicago Film Critics Association Awards 2008	Best Supporting Actress	Viola Davis	Nominated	
Chicago Film Critics Association Awards 2008	Best Adapted Screenplay	John Patrick Shanley	Nominated	
14th Critics' Choice Awards	Best Picture	Doubt	Nominated	
14th Critics' Choice Awards	Best Actress	Meryl Streep	Won	
14th Critics' Choice Awards	Best Supporting Actor	Philip Seymour Hoffman	Nominated	
14th Critics' Choice Awards	Best Supporting Actress	Viola Davis	Nominated	
14th Critics' Choice Awards	Best Acting Ensemble	Amy Adams, Viola Davis, Philip Seymour Hoffman and Meryl Streep	Nominated	
14th Critics' Choice Awards	Best Adapted Screenplay	John Patrick Shanley	Nominated	
Dallas–Fort Worth Film Critics Association Awards 2008	Best Supporting Actress	Viola Davis	Won	
Detroit Film Critics Society Awards 2008	Best Actress	Meryl Streep	Nominated	
Detroit Film Critics Society Awards 2008	Best Supporting Actress	Amy Adams	Nominated	
66th Golden Globe Awards	Best Actress in a Motion Picture – Drama	Meryl Streep	Nominated	
66th Golden Globe Awards	Best Supporting Actor – Motion Picture	Philip Seymour Hoffman	Nominated	
66th Golden Globe Awards	Best Supporting Actress – Motion Picture	Amy Adams	Nominated	
66th Golden Globe Awards	Best Supporting Actress – Motion Picture	Viola Davis	Nominated	
66th Golden Globe Awards	Best Screenplay	John Patrick Shanley	Nominated	
Houston Film Critics Society Awards 2008	Best Actress	Meryl Streep	Nominated	
Houston Film Critics Society Awards 2008	Best Supporting Actress	Amy Adams	Nominated	
Houston Film Critics Society Awards 2008	Best Supporting Actress	Viola Davis	Won	
Houston Film Critics Society Awards 2008	Best Screenplay	John Patrick Shanley	Nominated	
Houston Film Critics Society Awards 2008	Best Cast	Amy Adams, Viola Davis, Philip Seymour Hoffman and Meryl Streep	Won	
National Board of Review Awards 2008	Breakthrough Performance – Female	Viola Davis	Won	
National Board of Review Awards 2008	Best Cast	Amy Adams, Viola Davis, Philip Seymour Hoffman and Meryl Streep	Won	
Palm Springs International Film Festival	Spotlight Award	Amy Adams	Won	
Phoenix Film Critics Society Awards	Best Actress	Meryl Streep	Won	
13th Satellite Awards	Best Actress – Motion Picture	Meryl Streep	Nominated	
13th Satellite Awards	Best Supporting Actor – Motion Picture	Philip Seymour Hoffman	Nominated	
13th Satellite Awards	Best Adapted Screenplay	John Patrick Shanley	Nominated	
15th Screen Actors Guild Awards	Outstanding Performance by a Female Actor in a Leading Role	Meryl Streep	Won	
15th Screen Actors Guild Awards	Outstanding Performance by a Male Actor in a Supporting Role	Philip Seymour Hoffman	Nominated	
15th Screen Actors Guild Awards	Outstanding Performance by a Female Actor in a Supporting Role	Amy Adams	Nominated	
15th Screen Actors Guild Awards	Outstanding Performance by a Female Actor in a Supporting Role	Viola Davis	Nominated	
15th Screen Actors Guild Awards	Outstanding Performance by a Cast in a Motion Picture	Amy Adams, Viola Davis, Philip Seymour Hoffman and Meryl Streep	Nominated	
St. Louis Gateway Film Critics Association Awards 2008	Best Supporting Actress	Amy Adams	Nominated	
St. Louis Gateway Film Critics Association Awards 2008	Best Supporting Actress	Viola Davis	Won	
Washington D.C. Area Film Critics Association Awards 2008	Best Actress	Meryl Streep	Won	
Washington D.C. Area Film Critics Association Awards 2008	Best Cast	Amy Adams, Viola Davis, Philip Seymour Hoffman and Meryl Streep	Won	
