= Doubt: A Parable =

2004 play by John Patrick Shanley

Doubt, A Parable
- Original language: English
- Written by: John Patrick Shanley
- Characters: Sister Aloysius; Father Flynn; Sister James; Mrs. Muller
- Subject: A nun suspects a priest of molesting an altar boy
- Genre: Drama
- Setting: A Catholic school in the Bronx. Autumn 1964.

Premiere
- Date: November 23, 2004
- Place: Manhattan Theatre Club; New York City, New York

Doubt, A Parable is a dramatic stage play written by American playwright John Patrick Shanley. Originally staged off-Broadway at the Manhattan Theatre Club on November 23, 2004, the production transferred to the Walter Kerr Theatre on Broadway in March 2005 and closed on July 2, 2006 after 525 performances and 25 previews. The play won the 2005 Pulitzer Prize for Drama and 2005 Tony Award for Best Play. In 2008, the play was adapted as a feature film titled Doubt.

== Plot ==
The play is set in the fictional St. Nicholas Church School, in the Bronx, during the fall of 1964. It opens with a sermon by Father Flynn, a beloved and progressive parish priest, addressing the importance of uncertainty: "Doubt can be a bond as powerful and sustaining as certainty." The school's principal, Sister Aloysius, a rigidly conservative nun who is vowed to her order, the Sisters of Charity, insists upon constant vigilance. During a meeting with a younger nun, Sister James, Aloysius reveals a deep mistrust toward her students, her fellow teachers, and society in general. Naïve and impressionable, James is easily upset by Aloysius's severe manner and harsh criticism.

Aloysius and Flynn are put into direct conflict when she learns from James that the priest had a one-to-one meeting with Donald Muller, St. Nicholas's first African-American student. Mysterious circumstances lead her to believe that sexual misconduct occurred. In a private meeting, purportedly regarding the Christmas pageant, Aloysius, in the presence of James, openly confronts Flynn with her suspicions. He angrily denies wrongdoing by insisting that he was disciplining Donald for drinking altar wine and claims to have been protecting the boy from harsher punishment. James is relieved by the explanation. Flynn's next sermon is on the evils of gossip.

Aloysius, dissatisfied with Flynn's story, meets with Donald's mother, Mrs. Muller. Despite Aloysius's attempts to shock her, Mrs. Muller says she supports her son's relationship with Flynn. She ignores Aloysius's accusations. Before departing, she hints that Donald may be "that way", which may cause her husband to be beating him.

Flynn eventually threatens to remove Aloysius from her position if she does not back down. Aloysius informs him that she phoned the last parish to which he was assigned and that she discovered a history of past infringements. After declaring his innocence, the priest begins to plead with her, but she blackmails him and demands that he resign immediately, or she will publicly disgrace him with his history. Disgusted, she leaves the office. Flynn calls the bishop to apply for a transfer, and is subsequently promoted to pastor of a nearby parochial school.

After hearing the news, Aloysius reveals to Sister James that the decisive phone call to Flynn's previous parish was a fabrication and that she has no evidence of past wrongdoing. As a result, Aloysius is left with ambiguous doubt, and the audience is left to wonder if the doubt is in either herself or the Church. With no proof of Father Flynn's guilt or innocence, the audience is left with its own doubt.

== Cast ==
Character	Broadway	Film	Broadway Revival
Character	2005	2008	2024
Sister Aloysius	Cherry Jones	Meryl Streep	Amy Ryan
Father Flynn	Brían F. O'Byrne	Philip Seymour Hoffman	Liev Schreiber
Sister James	Heather Goldenhersh	Amy Adams	Zoe Kazan
Mrs. Muller	Adriane Lenox	Viola Davis	Quincy Tyler Bernstine

- Sister Aloysius Beauvier: The head nun and principal of St Nicholas School. Driven by a high sense of duty but rigid and conservative.
- Father Brendan Flynn: A middle-aged priest. Articulate and personable.
- Sister James: A young impressionable nun. Enthusiastic but inexperienced teacher.
- Mrs. Muller: The mother of Donald Muller, the school's first black student.

== Productions ==
The New York City production, directed by Doug Hughes, was performed in a one-act performance running approximately ninety minutes. In interviews, the cast said the second act took place when the audience left the theatre and began to discuss their differing opinions of the events, with some people agreeing with Aloysius and others siding with Flynn. Upon publication, Shanley changed the title from Doubt to Doubt: A Parable. The four original cast members were Cherry Jones as Sister Aloysius, Brían F. O'Byrne as Father Flynn, Heather Goldenhersh as Sister James, and Adriane Lenox as Mrs. Muller. This production had scenic design by John Lee Beatty, costume design by Catherine Zuber, lighting design by Pat Collins, and original music and sound design by David Van Tieghem.

In 2006, Eileen Atkins, Ron Eldard, and Jena Malone joined the cast and replaced Jones, O'Byrne, and Goldenhersh, respectively. In the fall of 2006, Jones headed the national touring company, consisting of Chris McGarry, Lisa Joyce, and Caroline Stefanie Clay. Doubt won the 2007 Touring Broadway Award as Best Play.

The West Coast premiere was directed by Claudia Weill and took place at the Pasadena Playhouse. Another production was staged at Rubicon Theatre Company in Ventura, California in 2010. It was directed by Artistic Associate Jenny Sullivan and starred Joseph Fuqua as Father Flynn and Robin Pearson Rose as Sister Aloysius.

In 2007, the play was staged in Venezuela, in the Cellarg Theatre, with Elba Escobar, Luigi Sciamanna, Mariaca Semprun and Beatriz Vazquez.

The Australian premiere was mounted at the Sydney Opera House by the Sydney Theatre Company on February 4, 2006. The cast included Alison Bell, Jennifer Flowers, and Christopher Garbardi, and was directed by Julian Meyrick. This was followed by the Asian debut of Doubt in Singapore on March 21, 2006, by ACTION Theatre, directed by Samantha Scott-Blackhall, with Nora Samosir as Sister Aloysius, Lim Yu-Beng as Father Flynn and Pam Oei as Sister James. The next production was in the Philippines on June 2, 2006. Doubt ran at the Auckland Theater Company in New Zealand, from March 16 to April 8, 2006, directed by Colin McColl, with Latham Gaines as Father Flynn, Elizabeth Hawthorne as Sister Aloysius, Kate Prior as Sister James and Goretti Chadwick as Mrs Muller.

In the Czech Republic, the play was premiered in 2007 by National Theatre in Prague with Jaromíra Mílová, Jan Novotný, Magdaléna Borová and Eva Salzmannová. In 2012 it was staged by a Czech non-professional theater group with Andrea Jeřábková, Libor Ulovec, Lucie Koderová and Martha Coutin Caicedo in the roles. The latter was awarded the Best Czech Non-Professional Drama Performance 2012.

The play was staged in the Philippines in 2006 by Atlantis Productions. This production starred Cherie Gil as Sister Aloysius and played at the Carlos P. Romulo Theater at the RCBC Plaza in June 2006.

The play premiered in the UK at London's Kiln Theatre (known then as Tricycle Theatre). Directed by Nicolas Kent, it starred Dearbhla Molloy as Sister Aloysius, Nikki Amuka-Bird as Mrs Muller, Padraic Delaney as Father Flynn and Marcella Plunkett as Sister James. The production ran from November 22, 2007, to January 12, 2008.

The play was directed by Roman Polanski during its run at the Théâtre Hébertot in Paris in late 2006. In April 2007, it was staged in Warsaw, Poland, by producer Gene Gutowski, at Polonia Theatre.

A production directed by Mel Hooley with Zimbabwean actors Kevin Hanssen and Anne Fischer was staged at Dorchester Arts in Dorset from August 19–21, 2010, supported by the British Council.

A production opened in Sydney, Australia, at the Old Fitzroy Theatre on May 12, 2017. The cast, Belinda Giblin (Sister Aloysius), Matilda Ridgway (Sister James), Damian de Montemas (Father Flynn) and Charmaine Bingwa (Mrs Muller), was directed by Dino Dimitriadis.

On June 1, 2023, the Roundabout Theatre Company announced that the play would receive its first Broadway revival at the Todd Haimes Theatre as part of its 2023–2024 season, starring Tyne Daly as Sister Aloysius and Liev Schreiber as Father Flynn. However, the first preview was cancelled, and on February 6, 2024, it was announced that Daly had to exit the production due to hospitalization. Isabel Keating, Daly's understudy, took over the role until February 11, 2024, with Amy Ryan assuming the role full time on February 13, 2024.

== Awards and nominations ==
=== 2005 Broadway production ===
Year	Award	Category	Nominee	Result
2005	Tony Awards	Best Play		Won
2005	Tony Awards	Best Actor in a Play	Brían F. O'Byrne	Nominated
2005	Tony Awards	Best Actress in a Play	Cherry Jones	Won
2005	Tony Awards	Best Featured Actress in a Play	Heather Goldenhersh	Nominated
2005	Tony Awards	Best Featured Actress in a Play	Adriane Lenox	Won
2005	Tony Awards	Best Direction of a Play	Doug Hughes	Won
2005	Tony Awards	Best Scenic Design in a Play	John Lee Beatty	Nominated
2005	Tony Awards	Best Lighting Design in a Play	Pat Collins	Nominated
2005	Drama Desk Awards	Outstanding New Play		Won
2005	Drama Desk Awards	Outstanding Actor in a Play	Brían F. O'Byrne	Won
2005	Drama Desk Awards	Outstanding Actress in a Play	Cherry Jones	Won
2005	Drama Desk Awards	Outstanding Featured Actress in a Play	Adriane Lenox	Won
2005	Drama Desk Awards	Outstanding Director of a Play	Doug Hughes	Won
2005	Pulitzer Prize	Drama	John Patrick Shanley	Won
2005	Theatre World Award		Heather Goldenhersh	Won

=== 2024 Broadway revival ===
Year	Award	Category	Nominee	Result
2024	Tony Awards	Best Actor in a Play	Liev Schreiber	Nominated
2024	Tony Awards	Best Actress in a Play	Amy Ryan	Nominated
2024	Tony Awards	Best Featured Actress in a Play	Quincy Tyler Bernstine	Nominated

== Adaptations ==
A 2008 film adaptation by Miramax stars Meryl Streep as Sister Aloysius, Philip Seymour Hoffman as Father Flynn, Amy Adams as Sister James and Viola Davis as Mrs. Miller (the name was changed in the film). Production began on December 1, 2007, with playwright John Patrick Shanley directing and Scott Rudin producing.

An opera based on the play, commissioned by the Minnesota Opera, premiered in 2013, with music by Douglas J. Cuomo to a libretto by Shanley.

== Bibliography ==
- Shanley, John Patrick (2005). Doubt: A Parable. New York: Theatre Communications. ISBN 978-1-55936-276-4.
