= Holter Graham =

American actor

- Born: Holter Ford Graham; February 11, 1972 (age 54); Baltimore, Maryland, U.S.
- Occupations: Actor, voice actor, film producer, voice-over narrator, film editor
- Years active: 1985–present
- Spouse: Neela Vaswani
- Website: www.holtergraham.com

Holter Ford Graham (born February 11, 1972) is an American actor and voice actor and the son of historian Hugh Davis Graham. He appeared in his first film, Stephen King’s Maximum Overdrive, at age thirteen. He is best known for his film work in John Waters’ original Hairspray; the Oscar-nominated Fly Away Home; Six Ways to Sunday; Spin the Bottle; and Offspring, as well as his television work on Damages, Rescue Me, Law & Order, Army Wives, and New York Undercover. From 2008–2010, Graham was the co-host of Planet Green’s series Wasted. Since 2000, Graham has been the voice of HBO, and has narrated more than 150 audio books, winning dozens of awards for his work.

Graham has a Bachelor of Arts from Skidmore College and Master of Fine Arts in Creative Writing from Vermont College, and is a certified auto and motorcycle mechanic. He is a serving officer in the performer’s and broadcaster’s union SAG-AFTRA, over the years holding positions of Local and National Board Member, National Vice President, Local Vice President and Local President for New York. He was a member of the G1, the bi-union group that designed the AFTRA and SAG merger of 2012.

Graham’s wife is his college sweetheart, the award-winning author, professor, and education activist Neela Vaswani. In 2010, he was diagnosed with acute lymphoblastic leukemia and had a successful bone marrow transplant.

== Awards ==
- Audie Award, Audiobook of the Year, The Only Plane in the Sky: An Oral History of 9/11
- Audiofile magazine Earphone Award, Alone
- Audiofile magazine Earphone Award, House on Fire, Nick Heller Book 4
- Audiofile magazine Earphone Award, Beneath the Bonfire
- Audiofile magazine Earphone Award, Dragonsworn, Dark Hunter Book 28
- AudioFile Best of 2012 Fiction, Canada
- AudioFile Best of 2012 Fiction, The Art of Fielding
- AudioFile Best of 2009 Mystery & Suspense, Vanished
- AudioFile Best of 2008 Fantasy, Acheron
- AudioFile Best of 2008 Fiction, The Resurrectionist

== Filmography ==
=== Films ===
- Small Time (2020) – Rick
- Joy Ride (2017) – Rick
- Offspring (2009) – Manetti
- Resurrection, Glen Canyon and a New Vision for the American West (2009) – Narrator
- The Diversion (2005) – Driver
- The Acting Class (2000) – Self
- Trifling with Fate (2000) – David
- Spin the Bottle (2000) – Jonah
- The Curse (1999) – Spencer
- Six Ways to Sunday (1997) – Madden
- Fly Away Home (1996) – Barry Stickland
- Cry-Baby (1990) – Strip Poker No. 2
- Two Evil Eyes (1990) – Christian (as Holter Ford Graham)
- Hairspray (1988) – I.Q. Jones
- Maximum Overdrive (1986) – Deke Keller

=== Television ===
- Wa$ted! (2008 to 2010) – Co-host
- Army Wives
  - "Onward Christian Soldier" (2009) – Coach Don Whitty
  - "Disengagement" (2009) – Coach Don Whitty
- Damages
  - "Hey! Mr. Pibb!" (2009) – Bartender
- As the World Turns
  - "Episode #1.13186" (2008) – Manny
- Rescue Me
  - "Retards" (2006) – Bartender
- Thrill Zone
  - "Arctic Void" (2005) – Narrator
- New York Undercover
  - "Smack Is Back" (1996) – Donnie
- Law & Order
  - "Guardian" (1995) – Erik Hanson
- Swans Crossing
  - "Episode #1.31" (1992) TV episode – Billy Gunn
  - "Episode #1.44" (1992) TV episode – Billy Gunn
  - "Episode #1.45" (1992) TV episode – Billy Gunn
  - "Episode #1.46" (1992) TV episode – Billy Gunn

=== Video games ===
- Red Dead Redemption 2 (2018) – Skinners Gang
- Grand Theft Auto V (2013) – The Local Population
- Star Wars: The Old Republic (2011) – Major Khourlet
- Red Dead Redemption (2010) – Sam Odessa, Drunk Man
- Manhunt 2 (2007) – Leo Kasper
- Grand Theft Auto: Liberty City Stories (2005) – Bikers, Forellis (Uncredited)
- The Warriors (2005) – Vance, Tracer, Goober, Bull, Gus
- CT Special Forces: Fire for Effect (2005) – Stealth Owl

=== Audiobooks ===
In this section, the date of publication of the audiobook, not the original work, is shown.

- The Only Plane in the Sky: an Oral History of 9/11 (2019)
- Permanent Record (2019)
- Fire and Fury: Inside the Trump White House (2018)
- "Nevernight: The Nevernight Chronicle, Book 1" (2017)
- Born on the Fourth of July (2016)
- The Revenant (2015)
- Instinct (Chronicles of Nick) (2015)
- Dragonbane (2015)
- The Highway (2013)
- Feature (2013)
- Flat Water Tuesday (2013)
- Long Shot (2013)
- The Bourne Imperative (2013)
- The Yellow Birds (2013)
- The Long Valley (2012)
- Canada (2012)
- 500 Days: Secrets and Lies in the Terror Wars (2012)
- The End of Illness (2012)
- The Art of Fielding (2012)
- Inferno (Chronicles of Nick) (2012)
- Time Untime (Dark Hunger Book 21) (2012)
- No Easy Day: The Firsthand Account of the Mission That Killed Osama Bin Laden (2012)
- Satori (2012)
- Jack Kennedy: Elusive Hero (2011)
- Back of Beyond (2011)
- Infamous(Chronicles of Nick)(2012)
- The Gentlemen's Hour: A Novel (2011)
- InVincible (Chronicles of Nick) (2011)
- Halo: Cryptum (Forerunner Saga series) (2011)
- Christine (2010)
- Halo: Evolutions (2010)
- No Mercy (Dark-Hunter series) (2010)
- Infinity (Chronicles of Nick) (2010)
- UR (2010)
- Hell's Kitchen (2009)
- Hit Hard (2009)
- The Last Light of the Sun (2009)
- Vanished (2009)
- Acheron (Dark-Hunter series) (2008)
- The Bodies Left Behind (2008)
- Dear John (2008)
- High Crimes: The Fate of Everest in an Age of Greed (2008)
- Island: Escape (2008)
- Just After Sunset (2008) – the stories "Willa", "The Cat from Hell", and "N."
- No Limits: The Will to Succeed (2008)
- The Resurrectionist (2008)
- War and Decision: Inside the Pentagon at the Dawn of the War on Terrorism (2008)
- Halo: Contact Harvest (2008)
- The Choice (2007)
- The Fourth Order (2007)
- Island: Shipwreck (2007)
- Island: Survival (2007)
- Schulz and Peanuts (2007)
- Dragon Fire (2006)
- The Husband (2006)
- Rebound Rules (2006)
- The Serial Killers Club (2006)
- Alibi: A Novel (2005)
- The City of Falling Angels (2005)
- One L (2005)
- Visits from the Drowned Girl (2004)

=== Producer ===
- The Diversion (2005)

=== Editor ===
- The Diversion (2005)
