= Spin the Bottle (1998 film) =

- Directed by: Jamie Yerkes
- Written by: Amy Sohn
- Starring: Heather Goldenhersh; Jessica Faller; Mitchell Riggs; Kim Winter; Holter Graham
- Distributed by: TLA Releasing
- Release date: October 2, 1998
- Running time: 83 minutes
- Country: United States
- Language: English

Spin the Bottle is a 1998 American comedy-drama film directed by Jamie Yerkes.

== Premise ==
Childhood friends meet up for a reunion.

== Cast ==
- Heather Goldenhersh as Rachel
- Jessica Faller as Alex
- Mitchell Riggs as Ted
- Kim Winter as Bev
- Holter Graham as Jonah
