= Margaret McEntee =

American Catholic nun and educator

Sister Margaret McEntee, SC
- Born: Margaret C. McEntee; July 10, 1935 (age 90); New York City, New York, US
- Occupations: Religious sister, teacher

Margaret C. McEntee SR. SC., also known by her confirmation name Marita James, (born July 10, 1935) is an American Catholic religious sister and educator who is known as being the inspiration for the character of Sister James in the Pulitzer Prize and Tony Award-winning play Doubt: A Parable by John Patrick Shanley. The 2008 film adaptation is dedicated to her.

== Biography ==
Sister James was born and raised in the Riverdale neighborhood of the Bronx, in New York City and is of Irish Catholic ancestry, the daughter of Margaret (née Ware) and James McEntee. She attended St. Margaret of Cortona School in Riverdale. She took the name of Marita James for her confirmation name. Later in her career it became acceptable for nuns to use their baptismal name, so she reverted to using the name Sister Margaret. She first taught school at St. Anthony's School in the Bronx.

She felt compelled to join the sisters at a young age, and after graduating high school she joined the Sisters of Charity of New York at age 18 in 1953. She became an educator at age 21. One of her students was the playwright John Patrick Shanley, who has stated in interviews that Sister James was a major influence in his life.

She has taught at many religious institutions in the Bronx, including principal at St. Barnabas High School, where she was inducted into the school's Hall of Fame in 2013. She has taught religion at the Notre Dame School, St. Raymond Academy, and the College of Mount Saint Vincent.

Through her work with the Sisters of Charity, she has been involved with many community service projects for the Bronx community. Outside of the Bronx, she served as the Assistant Principal at St. Augustine's College in Nassau, Bahamas, and also taught in Pennsylvania.

== Portrayal in media ==
When Doubt was preparing to open on the Broadway stage, she coached actress Heather Goldenhersh on how to play the role of a nun based on herself. Goldenhersh was nominated for the Tony Award for Best Featured Actress in a Play for her portrayal.

McEntee was hired to serve as technical advisor for the 2008 film version of Doubt. She coached the production team as well as actress Amy Adams, who was portraying her, in how things worked within the Sisters of Charity, in particular at the time the story is set in the 1960s. Adams was nominated for the Academy Award for Best Supporting Actress for her portrayal.

While the character Sister James is based on McEntee, the characters Father Flynn and Sister Aloysius, along with the story of abuse within the school where she taught, are entirely fictional and created by Shanley for dramatic purposes. McEntee has attended regional productions of Doubt as a special guest and mentor for the production.
