= Psychopathia Sexualis (play) =

Play written by John Patrick Shanley

Psychopathia Sexualis is a 1996 play by American playwright John Patrick Shanley.

== Plot summary ==
The play revolves around a struggling New York artist, Arthur, who has a secret involving a certain pair of socks. His best friend, Howard, tries to help him alleviate this problem by seeing his psychiatrist, Dr. Block, who has taken the pair of socks. Eventually Arthur's fiancée comes to his aid and faces off with the psychiatrist.

== Productions ==
Psychopathia Sexualis was first produced by the Seattle Repertory Company, Seattle, Washington, in March 1996, and then by the Center Theatre Group at the Mark Taper Forum, Los Angeles, California in May to June 1996. The play was directed by Daniel J. Sullivan in Los Angeles.

The play premiered Off-Broadway in a production by the Manhattan Theatre Club in January 1997 (previews), officially on February 26 and closed on April 20, 1997. The production featured Andrew McCarthy (Arthur), Park Overall, Daniel Gerroll and Edward Herrmann (Dr. Block), with direction by Daniel Sullivan, sets by Derek McLane and costumes by Jane Greenwood.

== Critical review ==
One reviewer noted that "to a certain extent, Psychopathia Sexualis is a farce, one that affectionately mocks the human condition as a whole." The Los Angeles Times reviewer wrote that "through its sleek first act, a smart new comedy about men and their befuddlements and a shrink who may just be the personification of evil."
