= Brían F. O'Byrne =

Irish actor (born 1967)

- Born: 16 May 1967 (age 59); Mullagh, County Cavan, Ireland
- Education: Trinity College
- Occupation: Actor
- Years active: 1994–present
- Spouse: Heather Goldenhersh (m. 2007; sep. 2024)
- Children: 2

Brían Francis O'Byrne (born 16 May 1967) is an Irish actor who works and lives in the United States. He was nominated for a Primetime Emmy Award for his role in the miniseries Mildred Pierce (2011) and won a BAFTA TV Award for his role in the drama series Little Boy Blue (2017).

O'Byrne has received five Tony Award nominations and won Best Featured Actor in a Play for his performance in the 2004 production of Frozen.

== Early life and education ==
O'Byrne was born in Mullagh, a village in the south-east of County Cavan, on 16 May 1967. He attended the Samuel Beckett Centre at Trinity College (T.C.D.) in Dublin. He moved to New York City in 1990, and was cast in the Irish Repertory Theatre production of Philadelphia, Here I Come!

== Career ==
O'Byrne first attracted notice for his performances in two plays by Martin McDonagh, The Beauty Queen of Leenane (1996) as Pato Dooley (for which he received a Tony Award nomination for Best Featured Actor in a Play) and The Lonesome West (1997). He is known for taking on serious and dramatic roles, such as a serial killer in Frozen (1998) (for which he won a Tony Award) and a priest accused of child molestation in Doubt: A Parable (2004), for which he received a Tony Award nomination. O'Byrne also appeared as a priest in the 2004 film Million Dollar Baby. In May 2007, O'Byrne was nominated for a Tony Award for his performance as Alexander Herzen in Tom Stoppard's 2002 trilogy The Coast of Utopia. He appeared in the play Outside Mullingar by John Patrick Shanley on Broadway in 2014, and received a nomination for the 2014 Outer Critics Circle Award, Outstanding Actor in a Play. O Byrne featured in the Irish hit tv series Love Hate as the Detective Inspector.

In 2011, O'Byrne was nominated for the Primetime Emmy Award for Outstanding Supporting Actor in a Miniseries or Movie for his performance in Mildred Pierce as Bert Pierce. O'Byrne was featured in the 2009–2010 ABC series FlashForward, in which he played Aaron Stark. The show was not renewed. FlashForward began airing in Ireland on 4 January 2010.

In 2012, O'Byrne was cast in the ABC drama pilot Gilded Lilys created and produced by Shonda Rhimes.

In 2017, O'Byrne appeared in Little Boy Blue as Steve Jones, the father of Rhys Jones who was murdered by gang members in 2007.

== Personal life ==
O'Byrne was married to American actress Heather Goldenhersh, with whom he co-starred in the Broadway play Doubt: A Parable as well as Three Women. The couple has two daughters. They separated in 2024.

== Filmography ==
=== Film ===
| Year | Title | Role | Notes |
|---|---|---|---|
| 1994 | Avenue X | 'Sonny' | Short film |
| 1997 | Electricity | Graham Crouch | Short film |
| 1997 | The Fifth Province | Timmy | |
| 1997 | The Last Bus Home | Jessop | |
| 2000 | An Everlasting Piece | George | |
| 2001 | Bandits | Darill Miller | |
| 2001 | Disco Pigs | Gerry | |
| 2001 | The Grey Zone | SS-Untersturmfuhrer | |
| 2001 | Mapmaker | Richie Markey | |
| 2003 | Easy | Mick McCabe | |
| 2003 | Intermission | Mick | |
| 2004 | Million Dollar Baby | Father Horvak | |
| 2005 | In an Instant | The Man | |
| 2005 | The New World | Lewes | |
| 2006 | Bug | Dr. Sweet | |
| 2007 | Before the Devil Knows You're Dead | Bobby | |
| 2007 | No Reservations | Sean | |
| 2009 | The International | The Consultant | |
| 2010 | Brooklyn's Finest | Detective Ronny Rosario | |
| 2011 | Season of the Witch | Grandmaster | Uncredited |
| 2013 | Medeas | Ennis | |
| 2014 | Jimmy's Hall | Commander O’Keefe | |
| 2014 | Queen and Country | RSM Digby | |
| 2020 | Sergio | Gil Loescher | |
| 2020 | My Salinger Year | Hugh | |
| 2022 | The Wonder | John Flynn | |
| 2024 | Conclave | Monsignor Raymond O'Malley | |
| 2025 | Dead of Winter | Tall Hunter | |

=== Television ===
| Year | Title | Role | Notes |
|---|---|---|---|
| 1998 | Amongst Women | Luke | 4 episodes |
| 2001 | Oz | Padraig Connolly | 3 episodes |
| 2004 | The Blackwater Lightship | Larry | TV film |
| 2005 | Law & Order: Special Victims Unit | Liam Connors | Episode: "Ghost" |
| 2007 | American Experience | Alexander Hamilton | Episode: "Alexander Hamilton" |
| 2007–08 | Brotherhood | Colin Carr | 18 episodes |
| 2009–10 | FlashForward | Aaron Stark | 17 episodes |
| 2010 | Medium | Clark Kerwin | Episode: "The People in Your Neighborhood" |
| 2011 | Mildred Pierce | Bert Pierce | 5 episodes |
| 2011–12 | Prime Suspect | Detective Reg Duffy | 13 episodes |
| 2013 | Gilded Lilys | Edwin Lily | Unsold TV pilot |
| 2013–14 | Love/Hate | D.I. Mick Moynihan | 11 episodes |
| 2015 | The Bastard Executioner | Baron Ventris | 3 episodes |
| 2015 | Exposed | Quigg | Unsold TV pilot |
| 2015 | The Last Ship | Seán Ramsey | 8 episodes |
| 2015 | Saints & Strangers | John Billington, Sr. | 2 episodes |
| 2015–16 | Aquarius | Ken Karn | 22 episodes |
| 2016–19 | The Magicians | Mayakovsky | 4 episodes |
| 2017 | Little Boy Blue | Steve Jones | 4 episodes |
| 2017 | Mercy Street | Allan Pinkerton | 5 episodes |
| 2017 | Manhunt: Unabomber | Frank McAlpine | 6 episodes |
| 2018 | Nightflyers | Auggie | Main role |
| 2019 | Hatton Garden | Basil | 4 episodes |
| 2020 | Lincoln Rhyme: Hunt for the Bone Collector | Peter Taylor / The Bone Collector | Main role |
| 2024 | Three Women | Mark Wilkin | 5 episodes |
| 2025 | The Abandons | Walter Paxton | Recurring role |

== Awards and nominations ==
| Year | Award | Category | Work | Result | Ref. |
|---|---|---|---|---|---|
| 1998 | Tony Award | Best Featured Actor in a Play | The Beauty Queen of Leenane | Nominated | |
| 1999 | Tony Award | Best Actor in a Play | The Lonesome West | Nominated | |
| 2004 | Tony Award | Best Featured Actor in a Play | Frozen | Won | |
| 2004 | Drama Desk Award | Outstanding Actor in a Play | Frozen | Nominated | |
| 2004 | Outer Critics Circle Award | Outstanding Actor in a Play | Frozen | Nominated | |
| 2005 | Tony Award | Best Actor in a Play | Doubt | Nominated | |
| 2005 | Drama Desk Award | Outstanding Actor in a Play | Doubt | Won | |
| 2005 | Outer Critics Circle Award | Outstanding Actor in a Play | Doubt | Won | |
| 2006 | Drama Desk Award | Outstanding Actor in a Play | Shining City | Nominated | |
| 2007 | Tony Award | Best Actor in a Play | The Coast of Utopia | Nominated | |
| 2007 | Drama Desk Award | Outstanding Actor in a Play | The Coast of Utopia | Nominated | |
| 2007 | Outer Critics Circle Award | Outstanding Actor in a Play | The Coast of Utopia | Nominated | |
| 2007 | Gotham Awards | Best Ensemble Cast | Before the Devil Knows You're Dead | Won | |
| 2007 | Satellite Awards | Best Cast – Motion Picture | Before the Devil Knows You're Dead | Won | |
| 2011 | Primetime Emmy Award | Outstanding Supporting Actor in a Miniseries or Movie | Mildred Pierce | Nominated | |
| 2013 | Drama Desk Award | Outstanding Featured Actor in a Play | If There Is I Haven't Found It Yet | Nominated | |
| 2014 | Outer Critics Circle Award | Outstanding Actor in a Play | Outside Mullingar | Nominated | |
| 2018 | British Academy Television Awards | Best Supporting Actor | Little Boy Blue | Won | |
| 2025 | Irish Film and Television Awards | Best Supporting Actor | Conclave | Won | |
