= Heather Goldenhersh =

American actress (born 1973)

- Born: Chicago, Illinois, U.S.
- Occupation: Actress
- Years active: 1996–present
- Spouse: Brían F. O'Byrne
- Children: 2

Heather Goldenhersh is an American actress. She has appeared on Broadway, on television, and in feature films.

== Early life ==
Goldenhersh was born in Chicago, Illinois and grew up in St. Louis. She has said that she is "half-Jewish by adoption on my father's side and Greek Orthodox (Christian) on my mother's side". She was a fundamentalist Christian for several years, but ultimately drifted away from the faith in her mid-20s.

== Personal life ==
Goldenhersh is married to her Doubt co-star, Irish actor, Brían F. O'Byrne. They separated in 2024.

== Filmography ==
=== Television ===
Year(s)	Title	Role	Notes
2000	The Great Gatsby	Myrtle Wilson	TV movie
2000	Sex and the City	Jenna	1 episode
2003	Law & Order: Criminal Intent	Roseanne Connelly	1 episode
2003	Law & Order: Special Victims Unit	Ellen Swanson	1 episode
2006–2007	The Class	Lina Warbler	Main role
2016	Modern Family	Mrs. Wilkerson	1 episode
2020	The Alienist	Matron	5 episodes
2024	Three Women	Arlene Wilkin	5 episodes

=== Film ===
Year	Movie	Role
1996	I'm Not Rappaport	Strike Woman
1997	Swallowed	Trina
1998	Spin the Bottle	Rachel
2001	The Believer	Linda
2002	Unconditional Love	Grace's Daughter
2002	Nicholas Nickleby	Fanny Squeers
2003	School of Rock	Sheila
2004	The Merchant of Venice	Nerissa
2004	Kinsey	Martha Pomeroy
2004	Tempting Adam	Kami
2005	Southern Belles	Margery
2006	Wedding Daze	Jane
2008	Leatherheads	Belinda
2008	Horton Hears a Who!	Who Girl (voice)
2016	Hail, Caesar!	Natalie - Secretary

== Theatre ==
Year	Title	Role
2005	Doubt	Sister James

== Awards and nominations ==
Year	Award	Category	Work	Result
2005	Tony Award	Best Featured Actress in a Play	Doubt	Nominated
2005	Theatre World Award	NYC Debut Performance	Doubt	Won
