= Dirty Story (play) =

Dirty Story is a 2003 play by John Patrick Shanley. It allegorically presents the political relationship between Israel and Palestine as a sexual, sadomasochistic relationship between a man and a woman. This turbulent relationship is refereed by a gun toting, cigarette selling American cowboy and his snide British side-kick.

It premiered in 2003, and was revived in 2012. It was published in 2008.

== Reception ==
A review in The New York Times called it "appallingly entertaining". Another review in The New York Times wrote that "The play's strength lies in Mr. Shanley's keen ear for each side's stereotypes, both of itself and of the other."

A review on TheaterMania wrote that "By play's end, the dialogue has devolved into baldly polemical statements; each actor is nothing more than a mouthpiece for a political position, and there is no sense of character remaining. This may have been the playwright's intention, but it's a losing strategy."

A negative review on Crosscut.com wrote "In the end, though, it’s hard to know what the point of Dirty Story is."
