= Adriane Lenox =

American actress

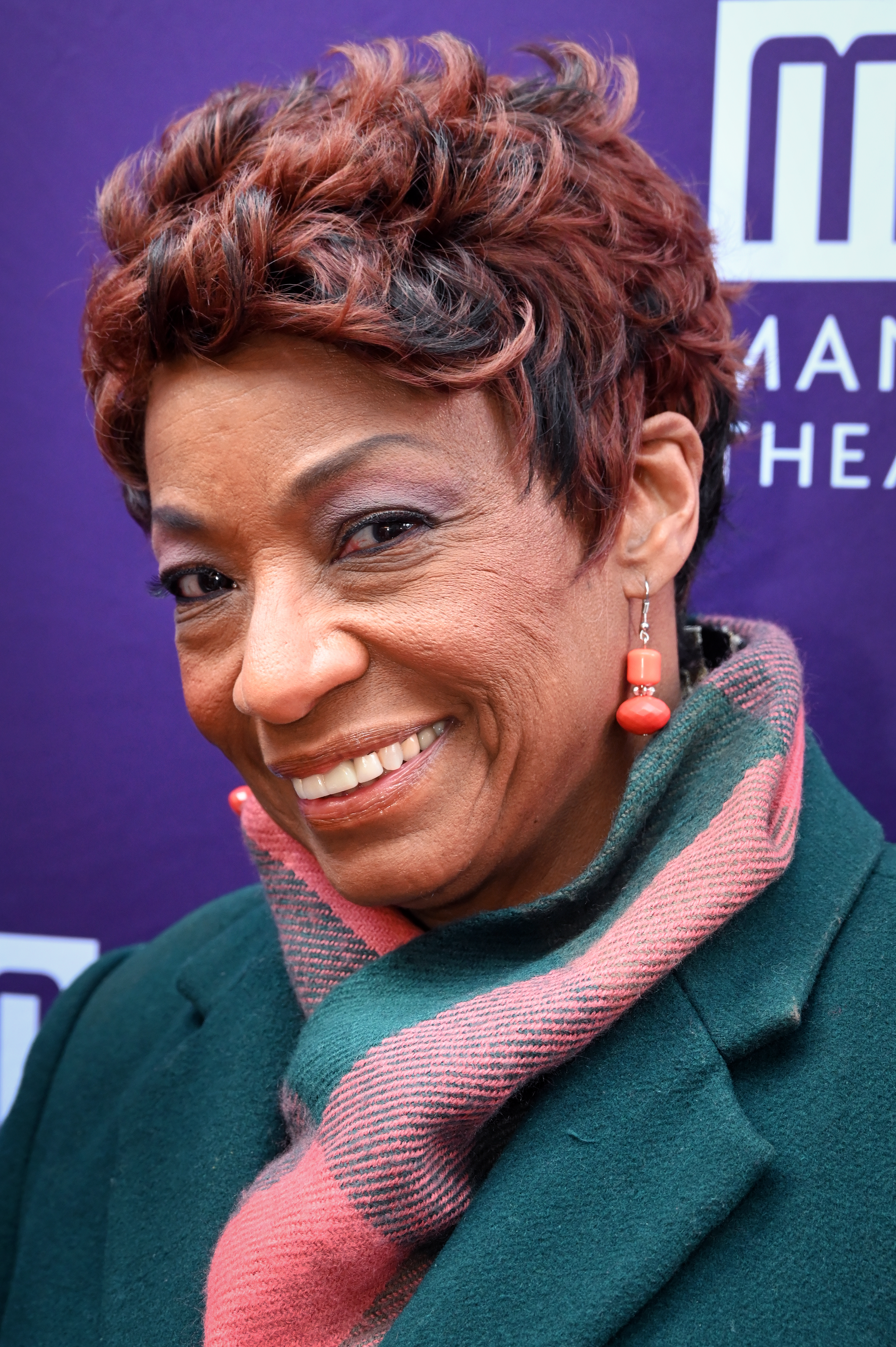
- Lennox in 2026
- Education: Lambuth University (BA)
- Occupation: Actress
- Years active: 1978–present

Adriane Lenox is an American actress, best known for her performances in Broadway theatre. Her performance in the play Doubt: A Parable garnered her the Tony Award for Best Featured Actress in a Play in 2005. She received another Tony Award nomination for After Midnight in 2014.

== Early life ==
Lenox, who is from Tennessee, attended Lambuth College in Jackson, Tennessee and has a degree in drama. She appeared in Ain’t Misbehavin in New York after graduation.

== Career ==
=== Stage ===
Lenox appeared in Doubt: A Parable on Broadway in 2005 as Mrs. Muller. She won the Tony Award, Best Performance by a Featured Actress in a Play, for this performance. Other Broadway appearances include Hattie in the Broadway revival of Kiss Me, Kate in 1999, a revue, The Gershwins' Fascinating Rhythm in 1999, Caroline, or Change in 2004 as standby for "Caroline Thibodeaux", and Chicago as the Matron (Replacement from August 2007 to October 2007). She appeared on Broadway in After Midnight, in 2013, reprising her role in the New York City Center Encores! staged revue Cotton Club Parade.

She has appeared in many Off-Broadway productions, starting with Beehive in 1986 at the Village Gate (Upstairs). She appeared in the "drama with music", Dinah Was in May 1998 to January 1999 at the Gramercy Theatre in the roles of Maye/Waitress/Violet, and won the Obie Award, Performance (1997–1998).

=== Film and television ===
Lenox had a role in the 2009 film The Blind Side, as Denise Oher. Her other film credits include Black Snake Moan (2006), My Blueberry Nights (2007), The Sorcerer's Apprentice (2010), and The Butler (2013).

On television, Lenox has appeared in episodes of Law & Order, Law & Order: Special Victims Unit, Third Watch and Nurse Jackie. She had the recurring roles on Lipstick Jungle, 30 Rock, Damages, Daredevil, The Blacklist, and The Path. She also had a role in the HBO film The Immortal Life of Henrietta Lacks starring Oprah Winfrey.

== Stage Credits ==
=== Broadway ===
Year	Title	Role	Notes
1978	Ain't Misbehavin'	Performer	Replacement, Broadway debut
1981	Dreamgirls	Lorrell Robinson	Replacement/ understudy
1995	How to Succeed in Business Without Really Trying	Miss Jones	Replacement
1996	Chicago	Matron	Replacement
1999	The Gershwins' Fascinating Rhythm	Performer	Original Broadway production
1999	Kiss Me, Kate	Hattie	Revival
2004	Caroline, or Change	Caroline Thibodeaux	Standby
2005	Doubt	Mrs. Muller	Originated the role
2013	After Midnight	Performer	Originated the role

=== Touring ===
Year	Title	Role	Notes
1979	Ain't Misbehavin'	Performer 5	First national tour
2006	Doubt	Mrs. Muller	

== Filmography ==
=== Film ===
Year	Title	Role
1987	Forever, Lulu	Girl in Strip Club
2005	Preaching to the Choir	Sister Emma
2006	Griffin & Phoenix	Doctor
2006	Black Snake Moan	Rose Woods
2007	Where God Left His Shoes	Carita
2007	My Blueberry Nights	Sandy
2007	Alvin and the Chipmunks	Vet
2009	The Blind Side	Denise Oher
2010	The Sorcerer's Apprentice	Ms. Algar
2011	The Inheritance	Felicia
2012	Red Lights	Rina
2012	Lola Versus	Professor
2012	You're Nobody 'til Somebody Kills You	Mother Malone
2013	The Inevitable Defeat of Mister & Pete	Group Home Lady
2013	The Butler	Gina
2014	The Skeleton Twins	Dr. Linda Essex
2014	Love Is Strange	Principal
2014	Affluenza	Professor Walker
2017	Crown Heights	Grace
2018	It's Time	Miss Hattie Winston
2019	21 Bridges	Vonetta Davis
2020	Bruised	Angel McQueen
2021	The United States vs. Billie Holiday	Mrs. Fletcher

=== Television ===
Year	Title	Role	Notes
1999	Double Platinum	Helen	TV movie
1999	Law & Order	Myra Warren	Episode: "Haven"
2000	Third Watch	Mrs. Felder	Episode: "Officer Involved"
2001	Law & Order: Special Victims Unit	Alva Tate	Episode: "Rooftop"
2001	Law & Order	Charlene Royal	Episode: "3 Dawg Night"
2003	Law & Order: Special Victims Unit	Sharon Tassler	Episode: "Perfect"
2004	Third Watch	Doctor	Episode: "Higher Calling"
2005	Law & Order: Special Victims Unit	Judy Carlton	Episode: "Rockabye"
2007	Shark	Mary Draper	Episode: "Porn Free"
2008–2009	Lipstick Jungle	Marva	Recurring
2009	Royal Pains	Hospital Administrator	Episode: "Pilot"
2010	Law & Order	Dolores Martin	Episode: "Four Cops Shot"
2010	Detroit 1-8-7	Eva Gibbons	Episode: "Lost Child/Murder 101"
2011–2012	30 Rock	Sherry	4 episodes
2011–2012	Damages	Angel Auroro	5 episodes
2012	NYC 22	Sheila Gordon	Episode: "Turf War"
2014	Unforgettable	Rhonda	Episode: "Manhunt"
2014	Black Box	Ruby Gibson	Episode: "Kodachrome"
2014–2017	The Blacklist	Reven Wright	Recurring
2015	Marvel's Daredevil	Doris Urich	Recurring
2015	Nurse Jackie		Episode: "Jackie and the Wolf"
2015	The Mysteries of Laura	Ms. Parker	Episode: "The Mystery of the Cure for Loneliness"
2016	Billions	Mrs. Sacher	Episode: "Boasts and Rails"
2016–2018	The Path	Felicia	Recurring
2017	The Immortal Life of Henrietta Lacks	Barbara Lacks	TV movie
2017	Blue Bloods	Judge	Episode: "The Enemy Of My Enemy"
2018-2022	Manifest	Beverly	Recurring role
2019	It's Bruno!	Jizzel	Recurring role
2020	The Undoing	Judge Layla Scott	Episode: "Do No Harm"
2020	Ms. Guidance	Lillian Barnes	Recurring role
2021, 2025	Only Murders in the Building	Roberta	2 episodes
2021	Law & Order:Special Victims Unit	Judge Annette Lewis	Episode: "The long arm of the witness"
2022	Julia	Virginia Naman	Guest

== Awards and nominations ==
Year	Award	Category	Nominated work	Result
2005	Tony Award	Best Performance by a Featured Actress in a Play	Doubt	Won
2005	Drama Desk Award	Outstanding Featured Actress in a Play	Doubt	Won
2014	Tony Award	Best Performance by a Featured Actress in a Musical	After Midnight	Nominated
2014	Drama Desk Award	Outstanding Featured Actress in a Musical	After Midnight	Nominated
