= Outside Mullingar =

2014 play written by John Patrick Shanley

- Written by: John Patrick Shanley
- Characters: Anthony Reilly, Tony Reilly, Rosemary Muldoon, Aoife Muldoon
- Setting: Irish countryside

Premiere
- Date premiered: January 23, 2014
- Place premiered: Samuel J. Friedman Theatre
- Official website

Outside Mullingar is a play by John Patrick Shanley, which ran on Broadway in 2014.

== Production ==
Outside Mullingar premiered on Broadway at the Samuel J. Friedman Theatre in a Manhattan Theatre Club production on January 3, 2014 (previews), officially on January 23, 2014. Directed by Doug Hughes, the cast stars Brían F. O'Byrne, Debra Messing, Dearbhla Molloy and Peter Maloney.

The play ended its limited engagement on March 16, 2014.

Outside Mullingar marked the Broadway debut of Debra Messing.

The play was commissioned by the Manhattan Theatre Club through the U.S. Trust New American Play Commissioning Program, and received the Edgerton Foundation New American Plays Award.

== Background ==
Shanley wrote about how he came to write the play, noting that he had his 60th birthday, and decided to write about the family farm. He also said that he wanted to write about love. "I found a strange relief in the play."

== Overview ==
The play is set in the Midlands of Ireland, and involves two farmers, Anthony and Rosemary, who live next to each other. Rosemary has been romantically interested in Anthony her entire life. Anthony, who is shy and unaware of Rosemary's feelings, dislikes farming, so his father Tony intends to leave the farm to a nephew. Although he dislikes farming, Antony is bereaved and outraged by his father’s constant jeering over the fact that he doesn’t “love the land”, when he was sole proprietor who kept the farm afloat.

== Critical response ==
Charles Isherwood for The New York Times wrote: "Outside Mullingar...represents Mr. Shanley’s finest work since Doubt...Mr. Shanley’s lyrical writing, and the flawless production, directed by Doug Hughes... give such consistent pleasure that even though we know the equations that define romcoms will add up to the familiar sums, we are happy to watch as they do."

The reviewer for USA Today wrote: "Had Shanley made Anthony and Rosemary, say, career-obsessed urbanites still living with their folks in the same apartment building, the story would seem ridiculously contrived. But by placing them in a rural setting where dating options are considerably more limited — not just by a less-dense population, but by cultural and religious mores...he makes their plight more credible and, despite some hokum, intriguing...if Shanley is raising less-complicated questions this time, there are flecks of wisdom in his sweetly diverting study."

The play was less well reviewed by Irish publications, with Fintan O'Toole of The Irish Times describing it as "mystifyingly awful" and "beyond the edge of awfulness." Similarly, it was described as an "overwrought comic romance" which "contains uncontrolled blarney, overwrought symbolism and emotional bogginess" by Lyn Gardner at The Guardian in the United Kingdom.

== Awards and nominations ==
Outside Mullingar was nominated for two 2014 Outer Critics Circle Award nominations, for Outstanding New Broadway Play and Outstanding Actor in a Play (Brían F. O’Byrne). The play received two 2014 Drama Desk Award nominations: Outstanding Play and Outstanding Featured Actor in a Play (Peter Maloney).

The play received one 2014 Tony Award nomination, for Best Play.

== Film adaptation ==
Shanley wrote and directed a film adaptation of his play titled Wild Mountain Thyme. It stars Emily Blunt and Jamie Dornan and was released on December 11, 2020.
