= Nora Samosir =

Singpoarean actress

- Born: Nora Anny Samosir; Singapore
- Occupations: Actress educator
- Years active: 1979–present

Nora Samosir is a Singaporean actress of Indonesian descent who won a 2002 Life Theatre Award for Best Supporting Actress. She has been active in the Singapore theatre scene since 1979 and has worked in television and film. Some of her more notable performances include The Swallowed Seed (2002) and Revelations (2003)

== Early life and education ==
Samosir was born in the British Colony of Singapore in 1957 to Batak parents originating from Indonesia. She speaks English, Malay and Indonesian fluently. She studied at the Central School of Speech and Drama, London, and graduated from York University, Toronto, Canada with a Bachelor of Arts (Honours), and has multiple qualifications in vocal training and voice studies.

== Career ==
Her professional training is in acting and voice production, which she also taught at the National University of Singapore. Samosir lectured in Theatre Studies and teaches voice production. Samosir is currently a lecturer in the School of Dance & Theatre at LASALLE, where she lectures in Acting and Musical Theatre.

Samosir has done extensive work in Singapore with such groups as Singapore Repertory Theatre (SRT), Action Theatre, The Necessary Stage (TNS), Cake Theatre, Black Tent Theater, Music and Movement, and TheatreWorks (TW), as well as performing at venues such as National Museum of Singapore, Dublin Fringe Festival, National Theatre Festival (at the National School of Drama in Delhi), Asian Theatre Festival at Kyungsung University in Busan, Lyric Theatre, Festival of Perth, TheatreWorks Retrospective Festival, Kuala Lumpur, Adelaide Festival of Arts, and National Institute of Education.

She is a member of the Association of Singapore Actors, the Singapore Drama Educators Association.

== Criticism and praise ==
In considering her role in Doubt (2006), Richard Lord of Quarterly Literary Review Singapore wrote that her portrayal of Sister Aloysius was unsympathetic and led to the audience believing in the innocence of Father Brendan as played by Lim Yu Beng. When speaking of her award-winning role of Claire in Proof (2002), Daniel Teo of Inkpot Reviews praised her performance and her precision, while Richard Lord of QLRS felt she exaggerated her character, but had shown better work in performance earlier that year." The following year in his review of Revelations (2003), Lord gave a mixed review of the production's "faulty structure", yet approved of Samosir's performance. In 2003, Samosir was involved with Pulse (2003), an experimental series of 3 interlinked plays loosely based on an urban woman's diary. The series was reviewed by Matthew Lyon of Inkpot Reviews, who felt her performance in the second of the three was "the strongest of the whole series."

== Filmography ==
=== Selected notable theatre appearances ===
- Asian Boys Volume 1 (2000) with The Necessary Stage
- Destinies of Flowers in the Mirror (2009)
- Temple (2008) with Cake Theatre
- 120 (2007) with the National Museum of Singapore
- Doubt (2006)
- Queen Ping (2006) with Cake Theatre
- The Vagina Monologues (2004) with The Arts House
- Revelations (2003) with TNS
- Pulse Version Theatre (2003) with TheatreWorks
- Proof (2002) with Action Theatre
- Fruit Plays (2002)
  - Human Heart Fruit by Stella Konand
  - The Swallowed Seed by Jean Tay

=== Film ===
- Singapore Shorts Vol. 2 (Asian Film Archive's) (2008)
- Imelda Goes to Singapore (2008)
- Shanghai Lily (1999)
- Passionflower (1986)

=== Television ===
- Masters of the Sea (1994)
- Shiver (1997)
- Ah Girl (2001–2002)
- Guru Paarvai (2004)
- Stories of Love (2008)

== Awards ==
- 2002 Life Theatre Award for Best Supporting Actress for her role of Claire in Action Theatre's 2002 production of "Proof".
