= John Patrick Shanley =

American playwright, theater director and filmmaker (born 1950)

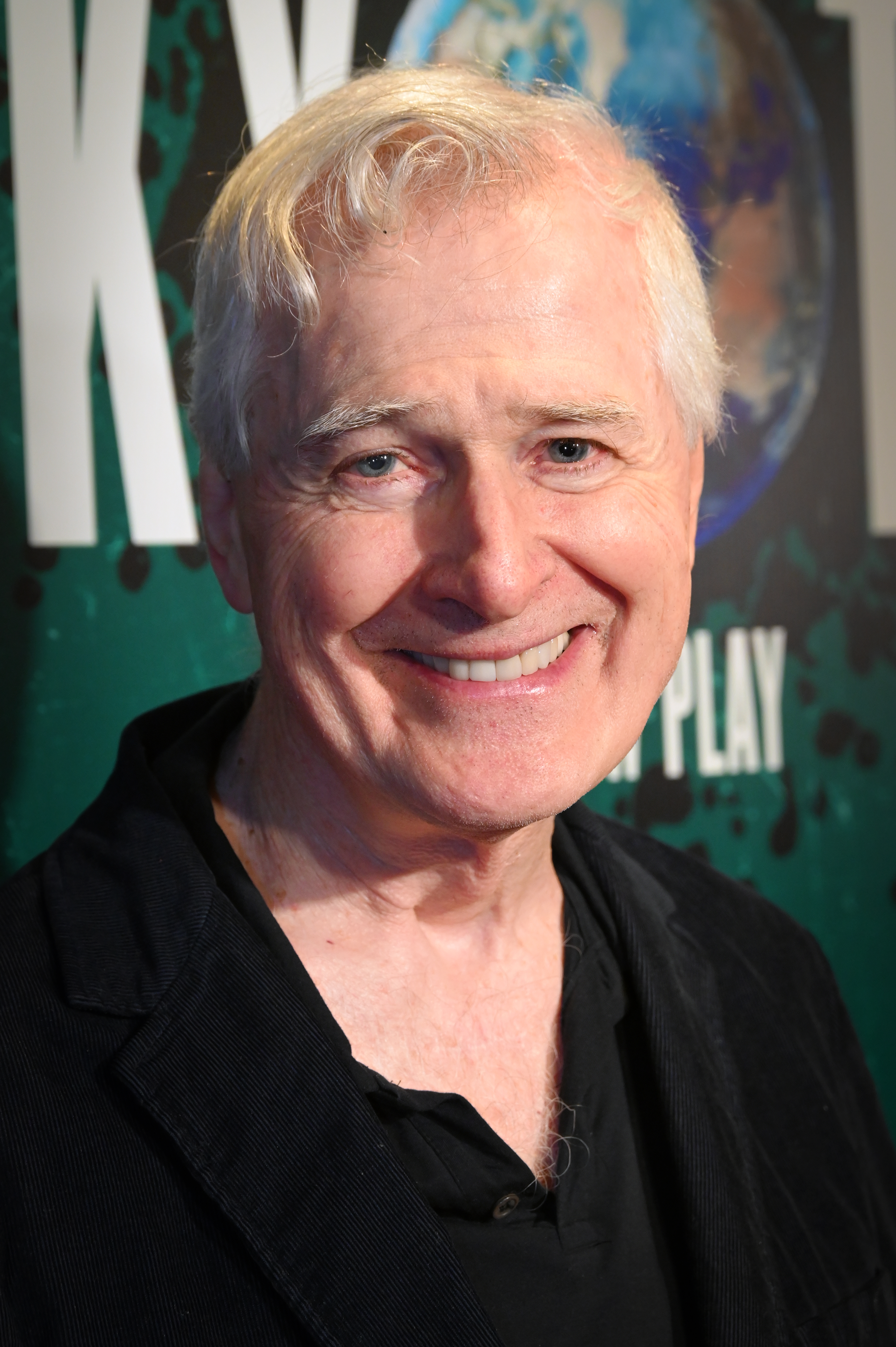
- Shanley in 2025
- Born: October 13, 1950 (age 75); New York City, U.S.
- Education: New York University (BA)
- Occupations: Playwright; theater director; filmmaker
- Spouse: Jayne Haynes
- Children: 2
- Writing career
- Years active: 1982–present
- Notable awards: Academy Award for Best Original Screenplay (1988); Pulitzer Prize for Drama (2005); Tony Award for Best Play (2005)

John Patrick Shanley (born October 13, 1950) is an American playwright, theater director, and filmmaker. He won the 1987 Academy Award for Best Original Screenplay for the film Moonstruck. His play, Doubt: A Parable, won the 2005 Pulitzer Prize for Drama and the 2005 Tony Award for Best Play; he wrote and directed the film adaptation, earning a nomination for the Academy Award for Best Adapted Screenplay.

== Early life and education ==
Shanley was born into an Irish-American family in The Bronx, New York City. His mother worked as a telephone operator, and his father was a meat-packer. The neighborhood Shanley grew up in was considered very rough.

Shanley's academic career did not begin well, but ultimately he graduated from New York University with honors from the Steinhardt School of Culture, Education, and Human Development. In his program bio for the Broadway production of Doubt: A Parable, he mentions that he was "thrown out of St. Helena's kindergarten, banned from St. Anthony's hot lunch program and expelled from Cardinal Spellman High School." He was heavily influenced by one of his first teachers, Sister Margaret McEntee, on whom he based the character of Sister James in his play, Doubt. While at Cardinal Spellman High School, he saw two school productions that influenced him: The Miracle Worker and Cyrano de Bergerac.

After his freshman year at New York University, Shanley was put on academic probation. He then enlisted in the United States Marine Corps, serving in a stateside post during the Vietnam War. Following his military service, he wrote a novel, then burned it, and returned to the university with the help of the G.I. Bill, and by supporting himself with a series of jobs: elevator operator, house painter, furniture mover, locksmith, bartender. He graduated from New York University as valedictorian in 1977, with a degree in Educational Theatre, and is a member of the Ensemble Studio Theatre.

== Career ==
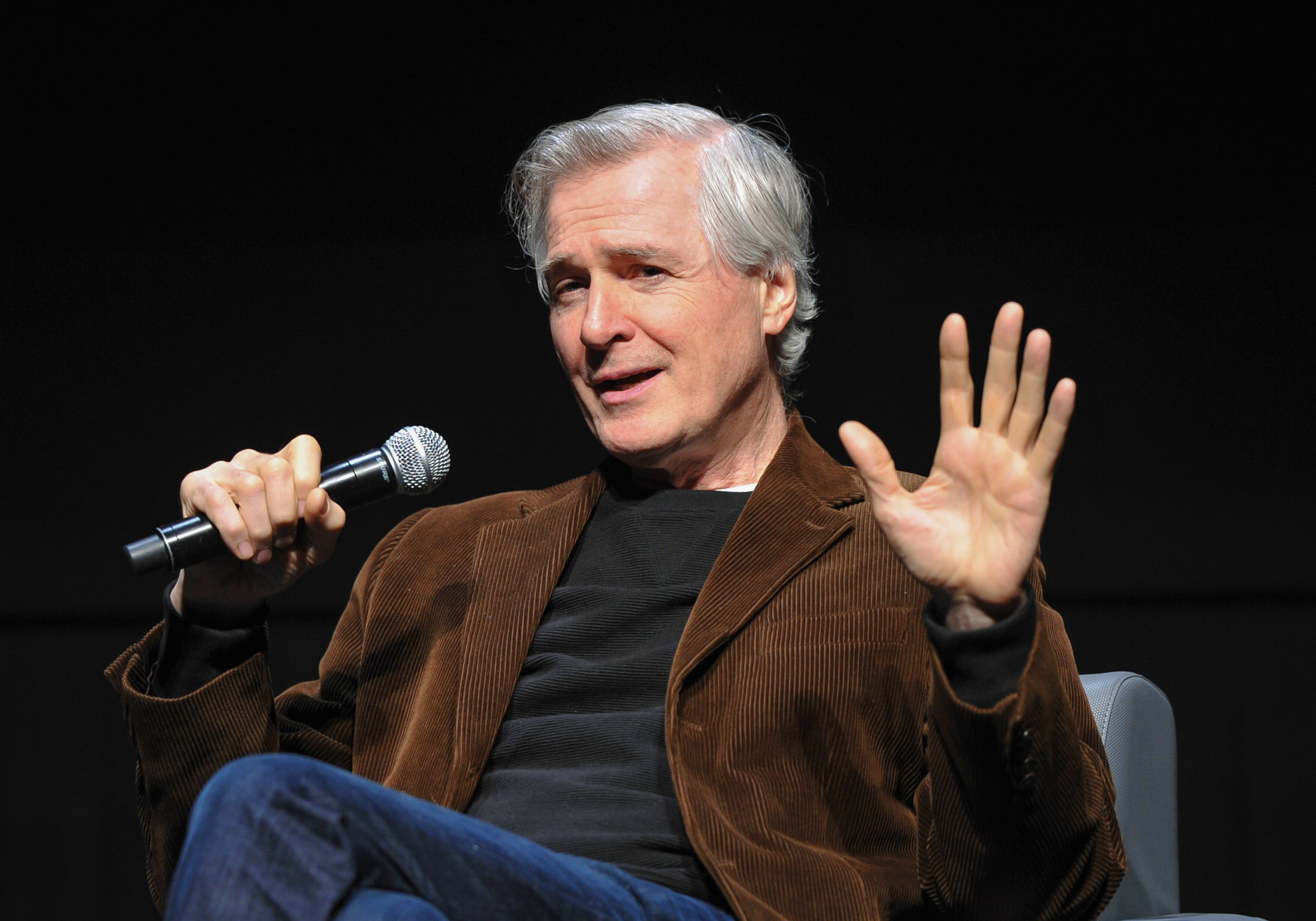
Shanley discussing adaptations and his creative process at the TIFF Bell Lightbox on March 23, 2015

Shanley is the author of more than 23 plays, which have been translated and performed around the world, including 80 productions a year in North America. He has often directed his own productions.

He has also written for film; his second film, Moonstruck (1987), stars Nicolas Cage and Cher, and won three Academy Awards, including one for his screenplay. In 1990, Shanley directed his script of Joe Versus the Volcano. Shanley also wrote two songs for the movie: "Marooned Without You" and "The Cowboy Song." He wrote the screenplay for the film Congo (1995), which was based on the Michael Crichton book.

His play Doubt: A Parable ran on Broadway from March 31, 2005, to July 2, 2006, and won four 2005 Tony Awards (including Best Play), the Drama Desk Award (including Outstanding Play) and the Pulitzer Prize for Drama. Shanley wrote and directed the 2008 film version, which starred Meryl Streep, Philip Seymour Hoffman, Amy Adams and Viola Davis. The screenplay was nominated for an Academy Award, and the Writers Guild of America Award for Best Adapted Screenplay. Doubt: A Parable, is featured in The Fourth Wall, a book of photographs by Amy Arbus for which Shanley also wrote the foreword.

In 2012, Shanley wrote the libretto for an opera version of Doubt: A Parable, which premiered at the Minnesota Opera in January 2013, with music by Douglas J. Cuomo. Until then, his experience with opera was not extensive; he had attended a few performances and had listened to recordings. As he worked on the libretto, using many lines that come directly from the play, he describes that his enthusiasm for the form grew. Also in 2012, his play Storefront Church ran Off-Broadway in a production by the Atlantic Theater Company. The play concerns Bronx residents "whose lives become tangled in unexpected ways when a mortgage goes sour". Storefront Church was also put up by San Francisco Playhouse in San Francisco in December 2013 where it was very well received.

His play Outside Mullingar opened on Broadway at the Samuel J. Friedman Theatre, produced by the Manhattan Theatre Club, on January 3, 2014 (in previews) and officially on January 23, 2014. The play was directed by Doug Hughes and starred Debra Messing and Brían F. O'Byrne. The play is set in the Irish countryside. In 2020, a film adaptation of the play was released, entitled Wild Mountain Thyme.

Prodigal Son, which he directed, was produced Off-Broadway by the Manhattan Theatre Club. It opened on February 9, 2016, and featured Timothée Chalamet, Robert Sean Leonard, Annika Boras, Chris McGarry and David Potters. The play concerns a lonely teen from The Bronx who attends a private school in New Hampshire. His play The Portuguese Kid opened on October 24, 2017, at the New York City Center Stage I, produced by the Manhattan Theatre Club. Directed by Shanley, the cast featured Jason Alexander, Sherie Rene Scott, Mary Testa, Aimee Carrero and Pico Alexander. His new play Brooklyn Laundry opened on February 6, 2024, at the Manhattan Theatre Club. Shanley directed, with a cast featuring Cecily Strong, David Zayas, Florencia Lozano, and Andrea Syglowski.

== Personal life ==
Shanley resides in New York City. He has been married and divorced twice; with his second wife, Jayne Haynes, he adopted two sons, both born in 1992.

== Works ==
=== Theater ===
Year	Title	Playwright	Director	Venue	Ref.
1982	Welcome to the Moon	Yes	No	Ensemble Studio Theatre, Off-Broadway	
1983	Danny and the Deep Blue Sea	Yes	No	Circle in the Square Theatre, Off-Broadway	
1984	Savage in Limbo	Yes	No	Gate Theatre, London	
1985	The Dreamer Examines His Pillow	Yes	No	47th Street Theatre, Off-Broadway	
1986	Italian American Reconciliation	Yes	No	Manhattan Theatre Club, Off-Broadway	
1986	Women of Manhattan	Yes	No	Manhattan Theatre Club, Off-Broadway	
1987	All for Charity	Yes	No	Ensemble Studio Theatre, Off-Broadway	
1990	The Big Funk	Yes	Yes	The Public Theater, Off-Broadway	
1991	Beggars in the House of Plenty	Yes	Yes	Manhattan Theatre Club, Off-Broadway	
1992	The Wild Goose	Yes	No	Ensemble Studio Theatre, Off-Broadway	
1993	Four Dogs and a Bone	Yes	Yes	Manhattan Theatre Club, Off-Broadway	
1996	Missing/Kissing	Yes	Yes	Primary Stages, Off-Broadway	
1998	Psychopathia Sexualis	Yes	No	Manhattan Theatre Club, Off-Broadway	
2001	Where's My Money?	Yes	Yes	LAByrinth Theater Company & Manhattan Theatre Club, Off-Broadway	
2001	Cellini	Yes	Yes	Second Stage Theatre, Off-Broadway	
2003	Dirty Story	Yes	No	LAByrinth Theater Company, Off-Broadway	
2004	Doubt: A Parable	Yes	No	Manhattan Theatre Club, Off-Broadway; Walter Kerr Theatre, Broadway	
2004	Sailor's Song	Yes	No	The Public Theater, Off-Broadway	
2005	Defiance	Yes	No	Manhattan Theatre Club, Off-Broadway	
2007	Romantic Poetry	Yes	Yes	Manhattan Theatre Club, Off-Broadway	
2010	Pirate	Yes	No	Powerhouse Theater; Vassar & New York Stage and Film	
2012	Storefront Church	Yes	Yes	Atlantic Theater Company, Off-Broadway	
2014	Outside Mullingar	Yes	No	Manhattan Theatre Club, Broadway	
2016	Prodigal Son	Yes	Yes	Manhattan Theatre Club, Off-Broadway	
2017	The Portuguese Kid	Yes	Yes	Manhattan Theatre Club, Off-Broadway	
2021	Candlelight	Yes	No	New Ohio Theatre, Off-Broadway	
2024	Brooklyn Laundry	Yes	Yes	Manhattan Theatre Club, Off-Broadway	

=== Film ===
Year	Title	Director	Writer	Ref.
1987	Moonstruck	No	Yes	
1987	Five Corners	No	Yes	
1989	The January Man	No	Yes	
1990	Joe Versus the Volcano	Yes	Yes	
1993	Alive	No	Yes	
1993	We're Back! A Dinosaur's Story	No	Yes	
1995	Congo	No	Yes	
2008	Doubt	Yes	Yes	
2020	Wild Mountain Thyme	Yes	Yes	

=== Television ===
Year	Title	Notes	Ref.
1993	Danny i Roberta	TV movie	
2002	Live from Baghdad	TV movie	
2018	The Portuguese Kid		
2019	Great Performances	Episode: "Cuomo: Doubt"	

== Accolades and honors ==
In 2002 Shanley was inducted into the Bronx Walk of Fame.

Awards

- 1988 Academy Award for Best Original Screenplay – Moonstruck
- 1988 Writers Guild of America Award for Best Original Screenplay – Moonstruck
- 2005 Drama Desk Award for Outstanding Play – Doubt: A Parable
- 2005 Pulitzer Prize for Drama – Doubt: A Parable
- 2005 Tony Award for Best Play – Doubt: A Parable
- 2005 Lucille Lortel Award for Outstanding Play – Doubt: A Parable
- 2005 Obie Award for Playwriting – Doubt: A Parable

Nominations

- 1988 Golden Globe Award for Best Screenplay – Moonstruck
- 1989 BAFTA Film Award for BAFTA Award for Best Original Screenplay – Moonstruck
- 2003 Primetime Emmy Award for Outstanding Writing for a Miniseries, Movie, or Dramatic Special – Live from Baghdad
- 2005 Drama Desk Award for Outstanding Play – Sailor's Song
- 2009 Academy Award for Best Adapted Screenplay – Doubt
- 2009 Golden Globe Award for Best Screenplay – Doubt
- 2009 Broadcast Film Critics Association Award for Best Writer – Doubt
- 2009 Writers Guild of America Award for Best Adapted Screenplay – Doubt
- 2014 Tony Award for Best Play – Outside Mullingar
