= List of Pixar awards and nominations (feature films) =

Pixar awards and nominations
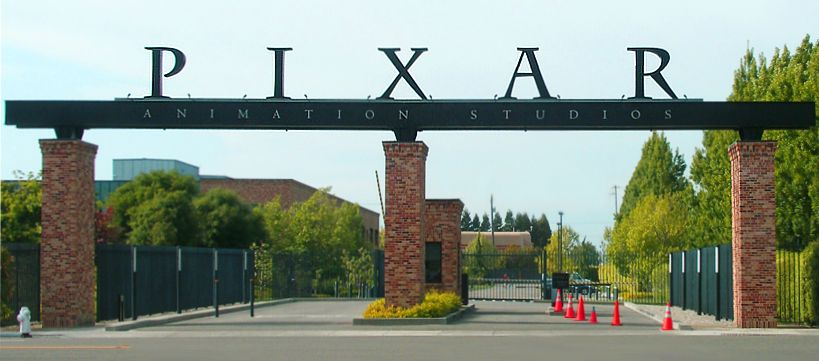
- Pixar's studio lot in Emeryville
Awards and nominations
| Award | Wins | Nominations |
| Academy Awards | 18 | 51 |
| Golden Globe Awards | 10 | 25 |
| Grammy Awards | 11 | 24 |
| Los Angeles Film Critics Association | 6 | 9 |
| Saturn Awards | 11 | 27 |

Totals (Note: Certain award groups do not simply award one winner. They acknowledge several different recipients, have runners-up, and have third place. Since this is a specific recognition and is different from losing an award, runner-up mentions are considered wins in this award tally. For simplification and to avoid errors, each award in this list has been presumed to have had a prior nomination.)
- Wins: 485
- Nominations: 1103

Pixar Animation Studios is a CGI animation production company based in Emeryville, California, United States. Created in 1979 as a division of Lucasfilm, it has been a subsidiary of The Walt Disney Company since 2006. Feature films produced by Pixar have won numerous awards, including eighteen Academy Awards, ten Golden Globe Awards and eleven Grammy Awards.

The following is a list of all the feature films Pixar has released with the nominations and awards they received.

== Films ==
=== Toy Story ===
Toy Story was released in 1995 to be the first feature film in history produced using only computer animation. The film, directed by John Lasseter and starring Tom Hanks and Tim Allen, went on to gross over $191 million in the United States during its initial theatrical release, and took in more than $373 million worldwide. Reviews were overwhelmingly positive, praising both the technical innovation of the animation and the wit and sophistication of the screenplay.

Awards
| Year | Association | Award Category | Recipient (if any) | Result |
|---|---|---|---|---|
| 1995 | Los Angeles Film Critics Association Awards | Best Animation | | Won |
| 1996 | ASCAP Film and Television Music Awards | Tox Box Office Films of 1995 Award | Randy Newman | Won |
| 1996 | Academy Awards | Best Original Screenplay | Joss Whedon (screenplay), Andrew Stanton (screenplay/story), Joel Cohen (screenplay), Alec Sokolow (screenplay), John Lasseter (story), Pete Docter (story) and Joe Ranft (story) | Nominated |
| 1996 | Academy Awards | Best Original Musical or Comedy Score | Randy Newman | Nominated |
| 1996 | Academy Awards | Best Original Song (for "You've Got a Friend in Me") | Randy Newman | Nominated |
| 1996 | Academy Awards | Special Achievement | John Lasseter | Won |
| 1996 | Academy of Science Fiction, Fantasy and Horror Films | Best Fantasy Film | | Nominated |
| 1996 | Academy of Science Fiction, Fantasy and Horror Films | Best Writing | Joss Whedon, Alec Sokolow, Andrew Stanton and Joel Cohen | Nominated |
| 1996 | Annie Awards | Best Animated Feature | | Won |
| 1996 | Annie Awards | Best Individual Achievement: Animation | Pete Docter | Won |
| 1996 | Annie Awards | Best Individual Achievement: Directing | John Lasseter | Won |
| 1996 | Annie Awards | Best Individual Achievement: Music | Randy Newman | Won |
| 1996 | Annie Awards | Best Individual Achievement: Producing | Bonnie Arnold and Ralph Guggenheim | Won |
| 1996 | Annie Awards | Best Individual Achievement: Production Design | Ralph Eggleston | Won |
| 1996 | Annie Awards | Best Individual Achievement: Voice Acting | Tom Hanks as Woody | Nominated |
| 1996 | Annie Awards | Best Individual Achievement: Technical Achievement | | Won |
| 1996 | Annie Awards | Best Individual Achievement: Writing | Andrew Stanton, Joss Whedon, Joel Cohen and Alec Sokolow | Won |
| 1996 | Chicago Film Critics Association | Best Original Score | Randy Newman | Won |
| 1996 | Golden Globe Awards | Best Motion Picture – Musical or Comedy | | Nominated |
| 1996 | Golden Globe Awards | Best Original Song – Motion Picture (for "You've Got a Friend in Me") | Randy Newman | Nominated |
| 1996 | Hugo Awards | Best Dramatic Presentation | | Nominated |
| 1996 | Kids' Choice Awards | Favorite Movie | | Nominated |
| 1996 | MTV Movie Awards | Best On-Screen Duo | Tim Allen and Tom Hanks | Nominated |
| 1996 | Motion Picture Sound Editors | Best Sound Editing – Animated Feature | Gary Rydstrom | Won |
| 1996 | Producers Guild of America Award | Special Award of Merit | Bonnie Arnold and Ralph Guggenheim | Won |
| 1996 | Young Artist Awards | Best Family Feature – Musical or Comedy | | Won |
| 1996 | Young Artist Awards | Best Voiceover Performance by a Young Actress | Sarah Freeman | Won |
| 1997 | BAFTA Awards | Best Achievement in Special Visual Effects | Eben Ostby and William Reeves | Nominated |
| 2001 | Online Film Critics Society | Best DVD (The Ultimate Toy Box Edition) | | Nominated |
| 2001 | Online Film Critics Society | Best DVD Special Features (The Ultimate Toy Box Edition) | | Nominated |
| 2004 | AFI's 100 Years...100 Songs | "You've Got a Friend in Me" | Randy Newman | Nominated |
| 2005 | National Film Preservation Board | Added to the National Film Registry | | Won |

=== A Bug's Life ===
A Bug's Life (officially trademarked as a bug's life) was released on November 25, 1998, in the United States. It tells the tale of a misfit individualist ant who hires what he thinks are "warrior bugs" (actually circus performers) to protect his colony from greedy grasshoppers. The film was directed by John Lasseter and also marked the last film appearances for Roddy McDowall and Madeline Kahn.

Awards
| Year | Association | Award Category | Recipient (if any) | Result |
|---|---|---|---|---|
| 1998 | Kansas City Film Critics Circle | Best Animated Film | | Won |
| 1998 | Los Angeles Film Critics Association | Best Animation – Feature-Length | | Won |
| 1999 | Academy Awards | Best Original Musical or Comedy Score | Randy Newman | Nominated |
| 1999 | Academy of Science Fiction, Fantasy and Horror Films | Best Fantasy Film | | Nominated |
| 1999 | Annie Awards | Outstanding Achievement in an Animated Theatrical Feature | | Nominated |
| 1999 | Annie Awards | Outstanding Individual Achievement for Directing in an Animated Feature Production | John Lasseter and Andrew Stanton | Nominated |
| 1999 | Annie Awards | Outstanding Individual Achievement for Production Design in an Animated Feature Production | William Cone | Nominated |
| 1999 | Annie Awards | Outstanding Individual Achievement for Writing in an Animated Feature Production | John Lasseter, Andrew Stanton, Joe Ranft, Don McEnery and Bob Shaw | Nominated |
| 1999 | Blockbuster Entertainment Awards | Favorite Animated Family Movie | | Won |
| 1999 | Bogey Awards | Bogey Award in Silver | | Won |
| 1999 | Broadcast Film Critics Association Awards | Best Animated Film | John Lasseter and Andrew Stanton | Won (tied with The Prince of Egypt) |
| 1999 | Broadcast Film Critics Association Awards | Best Family Film | | Won |
| 1999 | Casting Society of America | Best Casting for Animated Voiceover | Ruth Lambert | Won |
| 1999 | Chicago Film Critics Association | Best Original Score | Randy Newman | Nominated |
| 1999 | Golden Globes | Best Original Score | Randy Newman | Nominated |
| 1999 | Golden Screen Awards | Golden Screen | | Won |
| 1999 | Kids' Choice Awards | Favorite Movie | | Nominated |
| 1999 | Motion Picture Sound Editors | Best Sound Editing – Animated Feature | Gary Rydstrom, Tim Holland, Pat Jackson, Michael Silvers, Mary Helen Leasman, and Marian Wilde | Won |
| 1999 | Motion Picture Sound Editors | Best Sound Editing, Music – Animated Feature | Unknown | Nominated |
| 1999 | Satellite Awards | Best Motion Picture – Animated or Mixed Media | Darla K. Anderson and Kevin Reher | Won |
| 1999 | Young Artist Awards | Best Family Feature – Animated | | Nominated |
| 1999 | Young Artist Awards | Best Performance in a Voice Over in a Feature or TV – Best Young Actress | Hayden Panettiere | Nominated |
| 2000 | BAFTA Awards | Best Achievement in Special Visual Effects | William Reeves, Eben Ostby, Rick Sayre, and Sharon Callahan | Nominated |
| 2000 | Grammy Awards | Best Instrumental Composition | Randy Newman | Won |
| 2000 | Grammy Awards | Best Song (for the song "The Time of Your Life") | Randy Newman | Nominated |

=== Toy Story 2 ===
Toy Story 2 was released in 1999, directed by John Lasseter, Lee Unkrich and Ash Brannon. The movie keeps most of the original characters and voices from Toy Story, including Tom Hanks, Tim Allen, Don Rickles, Jim Varney, Wallace Shawn, Annie Potts, and John Ratzenberger. They are joined by new characters voiced by Joan Cusack, Kelsey Grammer, Wayne Knight, and Estelle Harris.

Awards
| Year | Award | Category | Recipients | Result |
|---|---|---|---|---|
| 2000 | ASCAP Film and Television Music Awards | Top Box Office Films of 2000 Award | Randy Newman | Won |
| 2000 | Academy Awards | Best Original Song | Randy Newman (for "When She Loved Me") | Nominated |
| 2000 | Saturn Awards | Best Fantasy Film | | Nominated |
| 2000 | Saturn Awards | Best Music | Randy Newman | Nominated |
| 2000 | Annie Awards | Animated Theatrical Feature | Helene Plotkin & Karen Robert Jackson | Won |
| 2000 | Annie Awards | Outstanding Individual Achievement for Character Animation | Doug Sweetland | Nominated |
| 2000 | Annie Awards | Outstanding Individual Achievement for Directing in an Animated Feature Production | John Lasseter, Lee Unkrich & Ash Brannon | Won |
| 2000 | Annie Awards | Outstanding Individual Achievement for Music in an Animated Feature Production | Randy Newman | Won |
| 2000 | Annie Awards | Outstanding Individual Achievement for Production Design in an Animated Feature Production | William Cone & Jim Pearson | Nominated |
| 2000 | Annie Awards | Outstanding Individual Achievement for Storyboarding in an Animated Feature Production | Dan Jeup & Joe Ranft | Won |
| 2000 | Annie Awards | Outstanding Individual Achievement for Voice Acting by a Female Performer in an Animated Feature Production | Joan Cusack | Won |
| 2000 | Annie Awards | Outstanding Individual Achievement for Voice Acting by a Male Performer in an Animated Feature Production | Tim Allen | Won |
| 2000 | Annie Awards | Outstanding Individual Achievement for Writing in an Animated Feature Production | John Lasseter, Pete Docter, Ash Brannon, Andrew Stanton, Rita Hsiao, Doug Chamberlin & Chris Webb | Won |
| 2000 | Blockbuster Entertainment Awards | Best Family Film (Internet Only) | | Won |
| 2000 | Bogey Awards | Bogey Award | | Won |
| 2000 | Broadcast Film Critics Association Awards | Best Animated Film | John Lasseter, Lee Unkrich and Ash Brannon | Won |
| 2000 | Casting Society of America | Best Casting for Animated Voiceover – Feature Film | Ruth Lambert | Nominated |
| 2000 | Golden Globe Awards | Best Picture – Musical or Comedy | | Won |
| 2000 | Golden Globe Awards | Best Original Song | Randy Newman (for "When She Loved Me") | Nominated |
| 2000 | Kids' Choice Awards | Favorite Movie | | Nominated |
| 2000 | Kids' Choice Awards | Favorite Voice from an Animated Movie | Tim Allen | Nominated |
| 2000 | Kids' Choice Awards | Favorite Voice from an Animated Movie | Tom Hanks | Nominated |
| 2000 | MTV Movie Awards | Best On-Screen Duo | Tim Allen & Tom Hanks | Nominated |
| 2000 | Motion Picture Sound Editors | Best Sound Editing – Animated Feature | Gary Rydstrom, Tom Myers, Michael Silvers, Mary Helen Leasman, Shannon Mills, Teresa Eckton, Susan Sanford, Bruce Lacey & Jonathan Null | Nominated |
| 2000 | Motion Picture Sound Editors | Best Sound Editing, Music – Animation | Bruno Coon & Lisa Jaime | Nominated |
| 2000 | Online Film Critics Society | Best Film | | Nominated |
| 2000 | Online Film Critics Society | Best Original Screenplay | Andrew Stanton, Rita Hsiao, Doug Chamberlin & Chris Webb | Nominated |
| 2000 | Satellite Awards | Best Motion Picture, Animated or Mixed Media | | Nominated |
| 2000 | Satellite Awards | Best Original Song | Sarah McLachlan (for "When She Loved Me") | Nominated |
| 2000 | Young Artist Awards | Best Family Feature Film – Animated | | Won |
| 2001 | Grammy Awards | Best Song Written for a Motion Picture, Television or Other Visual Media | Randy Newman (for "When She Loved Me") | Won |
| 2001 | Grammy Awards | Best Score Soundtrack Album for a Motion Picture, Television or Other Visual Media | Randy Newman | Nominated |
| 2001 | Grammy Awards | Best Country Performance by a Duo or Group with Vocal | Riders in the Sky (for "Woody's Roundup") | Nominated |
| 2005 | Satellite Awards | Outstanding Youth DVD (2-Disc Special Edition) | | Won |

=== Monsters, Inc. ===
Monsters, Inc. was released in 2001 written by Jack W. Bunting, Jill Culton, Peter Docter, Ralph Eggleston, Dan Gerson, Jeff Pidgeon, Rhett Reese, Jonathan Roberts and Andrew Stanton. It was directed by Pete Docter, co-directed by Lee Unkrich, and David Silverman.

Monsters, Inc. premiered in the United States on October 28, 2001, and went into general release on November 2, 2001, and was a commercial and critical success, grossing over $525 million worldwide during its initial theatrical release. Review aggregator Rotten Tomatoes also reported extremely positive reviews with a fresh 96% approval rating.

Awards
| Year | Association | Award Category | Recipient (if any) | Result |
|---|---|---|---|---|
| 2002 | ASCAP Film and Television Music Awards | Top Box Office Films of 2002 Award | Randy Newman | Won |
| 2002 | Academy Awards | Best Animated Feature | Pete Docter and John Lasseter | Nominated |
| 2002 | Academy Awards | Best Original Score | Randy Newman | Nominated |
| 2002 | Academy Awards | Best Original Song (for "If I Didn't Have You") | Randy Newman | Won |
| 2002 | Academy Awards | Best Sound Editing | Gary Rydstrom and Michael Silvers | Nominated |
| 2002 | Academy of Science Fiction, Fantasy and Horror Films | Best animated Film | | Nominated |
| 2002 | Academy of Science Fiction, Fantasy and Horror Films | Best film | Robert L. Baird and Daniel Gerson | Nominated |
| 2002 | American Cinema Editors | Best animated Feature Film – Comedy or Musical | Jim Stewart | Nominated |
| 2002 | BAFTA Awards | BAFTA Children's Award - Best Feature Film | Darla K. Anderson, Pete Docter, Andrew Stanton and Daniel Gerson | Won |
| 2002 | Bogey Awards | Bogey Award in Silver | | Won |
| 2002 | Broadcast Film Critics Association Awards | Best Animated Film | | Nominated |
| 2002 | Golden Trailer Awards | Best Animation/Family (for "Trailer #1") | | Won |
| 2002 | Golden Trailer Awards | Best Comedy | | Nominated |
| 2002 | Hochi Film Awards | Best Foreign Language Film | Pete Docter, David Silverman and Lee Unkrich | Won |
| 2002 | Hugo Awards | Best animated cinema | | Nominated |
| 2002 | Kids' Choice Awards | Favorite Voice from an Animated Movie | Billy Crystal | Nominated |
| 2002 | Motion Picture Sound Editors | Best Sound Editing – Animated Feature Film, Domestic and Foreign | Gary Rydstrom, Michael Silvers, Karen G. Wilson, Jonathan Null, Tom Myers, Shannon Mills, Teresa Eckton, Stephen Kearney and Lindakay Brown | Nominated |
| 2002 | Motion Picture Sound Editors | Best Sound Editing, Music – Animated Feature | Bruno Coon | Nominated |
| 2002 | Online Film Critics Society | Best Animated Feature | | Nominated |
| 2002 | Satellite Awards | Best Motion Picture, Animated or Mixed Media | | Nominated |
| 2002 | World Soundtrack Awards | Best Original Song Written for a Film (for "If I Didn't Have You") | Randy Newman, Billy Crystal and John Goodman | Won |
| 2002 | World Soundtrack Awards | Best Original Soundtrack of the Year - Orchestral | Randy Newman | Nominated |
| 2002 | World Soundtrack Awards | Soundtrack Composer of the Year | Randy Newman | Nominated |
| 2002 | Young Artist Awards | Best Family Feature Film – Animation | | Nominated |
| 2003 | Academy of Science Fiction, Fantasy and Horror Films | Best DVD Special Edition Release | | Nominated |
| 2003 | Annie Awards | Outstanding Achievement in an Animated Theatrical Feature | | Nominated |
| 2003 | Annie Awards | Outstanding Character Animation | Doug Sweetland | Won |
| 2003 | Annie Awards | Outstanding Character Animation | John Kahrs | Nominated |
| 2003 | Annie Awards | Outstanding Character Design in an Animated Feature Production | Ricky Nierva | Nominated |
| 2003 | Annie Awards | Outstanding Directing in an Animated Feature Production | Pete Docter, Lee Unkrich and David Silverman | Nominated |
| 2003 | Annie Awards | Outstanding Music in an Animated Feature Production | Randy Newman | Nominated |
| 2003 | Annie Awards | Outstanding Production Design in an Animated Feature Production | Harley Jessup | Nominated |
| 2003 | Annie Awards | Outstanding Writing in an Animated Feature Production | Andrew Stanton and Daniel Gerson | Nominated |
| 2003 | Grammy Awards | Best Song (for "If I Didn't Have You") | Randy Newman | Won |
| 2003 | Grammy Awards | Best Score Soundtrack Album | Randy Newman | Nominated |
| 2003 | Satellite Awards | Best Youth DVD | | Won |

=== Finding Nemo ===
Finding Nemo was released in 2003, written by Andrew Stanton, directed by Stanton and Lee Unkrich. It tells the story of the overly protective clownfish Marlin (Albert Brooks), who along with a regal tang called Dory (Ellen DeGeneres), searches for his son Nemo (Alexander Gould). Along the way he learns to take risks and that his son is capable of taking care of himself.

The film received overwhelmingly positive reviews and won the Academy Award for Best Animated Feature, the first Pixar feature to do so. It was a financial blockbuster as it grossed over $867 million worldwide during its initial theatrical release. It is the best-selling DVD of all time, with over 40 million copies sold as of 2006 and is the third highest-grossing G-rated film of all time, behind Toy Story 3 and The Lion King. In 2008, the American Film Institute named it the 10th greatest American Animated film ever made during their 10 Top 10.

Awards
| Year | Association | Award Category | Recipient (if any) | Result |
|---|---|---|---|---|
| 2003 | DVD Exclusive Awards | Best Behind-the-Scenes Program (New for DVD), (for "Making Nemo") | Rick Butle and Bill Kinder | Nominated |
| 2003 | DVD Exclusive Awards | Best Deleted Scenes, Outtakes and Bloopers | Bill Kinder, Andrew Stanton and Roger Gould | Won (tied with The Osbournes: The First Season—Uncensored) |
| 2003 | DVD Exclusive Awards | Best Games and Interactivities | Bill Kinder and David Jessen | Won |
| 2003 | DVD Exclusive Awards | Best Menu Design | Bill Kinder and David Jessen | Won |
| 2003 | DVD Exclusive Awards | Best New Movie Scenes (Finished-Edited Into Movie or Stand-Alone), for "Exploring the Reef with Jean-Michel Cousteau" | Roger Gould | Nominated |
| 2003 | DVD Exclusive Awards | Best Overall DVD, New Movie (Including All Extra Features) | Bill Kinder and Jeffrey Lerner | Nominated |
| 2003 | European Film Awards | Favorite International Animated movie Award | Andrew Stanton and Lee Unkrich | Nominated |
| 2003 | Hollywood Film Festival | Hollywood Film Award - Animation | Andrew Stanton | Won |
| 2003 | National Board of Review | Best Animated Feature | | Won |
| 2003 | Toronto Film Critics Association | Best Animated Film | | Won |
| 2003 | Washington D.C. Area Film Critics Association | Best Screenplay, Original | Bob Peterson, David Reynolds and Andrew Stanton | Nominated |
| 2004 | Academy Awards | Best Original Screenplay | Andrew Stanton (screenplay/story), Bob Peterson (screenplay) and David Reynolds (screenplay) | Nominated |
| 2004 | Academy Awards | Best Animated Feature | Andrew Stanton | Won |
| 2004 | Academy Awards | Best Original Score | Thomas Newman | Nominated |
| 2004 | Academy Awards | Best Sound Editing | Gary Rydstrom and Michael Silvers | Nominated |
| 2004 | Amanda Awards | Best Foreign Film (Årets utenlandske kinofilm) | Andrew Stanton | Nominated |
| 2004 | American Cinema Editors | Best Animated Feature Film – Comedy or Musical | David Ian Salter and Lee Unkrich | Nominated |
| 2004 | The American Screenwriters Association | Best animation Award | Andrew Stanton, Bob Peterson and David Reynolds | Nominated |
| 2004 | Annie Awards | Outstanding Achievement in an Animated Theatrical Feature | | Won |
| 2004 | Annie Awards | Outstanding Character Animation | David Devan | Nominated |
| 2004 | Annie Awards | Outstanding Character Animation | Doug Sweetland | Won |
| 2004 | Annie Awards | Outstanding Character Animation | Gini Santos | Nominated |
| 2004 | Annie Awards | Outstanding Character Design in an Animated Feature Production | Ricky Nierva | Won |
| 2004 | Annie Awards | Outstanding Directing in an Animated Feature Production | Andrew Stanton and Lee Unkrich | Won |
| 2004 | Annie Awards | Outstanding Effects Animation | Justin Paul Ritter | Nominated |
| 2004 | Annie Awards | Outstanding Effects Animation | Martin Nguyen | Won |
| 2004 | Annie Awards | Outstanding Music in an Animated Feature Production | Thomas Newman | Won |
| 2004 | Annie Awards | Outstanding Production Design in an Animated Feature Production | Ralph Eggleston | Won |
| 2004 | Annie Awards | Outstanding Voice Acting in an Animated Feature Production | Ellen DeGeneres | Won |
| 2004 | Annie Awards | Outstanding Writing in an Animated Feature Production | Andrew Stanton, Bob Peterson and David Reynolds | Won |
| 2004 | BAFTA Awards | Best Screenplay, Original | Andrew Stanton, Bob Peterson and David Reynolds | Nominated |
| 2004 | BMI Film & TV Awards | BMI Film Music Award | Thomas Newman | Won |
| 2004 | Broadcast Film Critics Association Awards | Best Animated Feature | | Won |
| 2004 | Broadcast Film Critics Association Awards | Best Picture | | Nominated |
| 2004 | Chicago Film Critics Association | Best Picture | | Nominated |
| 2004 | Chicago Film Critics Association | Best Supporting Actress | Ellen DeGeneres | Nominated |
| 2004 | Dallas-Fort Worth Film Critics Association Awards | Best Animated Film | | Won |
| 2004 | European Film Awards | Screen International Award | Andrew Stanton and Lee Unkrich | Nominated |
| 2004 | Florida Film Critics Circle Awards | Best Animation | | Won |
| 2004 | Genesis Awards | Feature Film – Animated | | Won |
| 2004 | Golden Globes | Best Picture Musical or Comedy | | Nominated |
| 2004 | Golden Trailer Awards | Best Animation/Family | | Nominated |
| 2004 | Hugo Awards | Best Dramatic Presentation – Long Form | | Nominated |
| 2004 | Humanitas Prize | Feature Film Category Award | Andrew Stanton, Bob Peterson and David Reynolds | Nominated |
| 2004 | Kansas City Film Critics Circle Awards | Best Animated Film | | Won |
| 2004 | Kids' Choice Awards | Favorite Movie | | Won |
| 2004 | Kids' Choice Awards | Favorite Voice from an Animated Movie | Ellen DeGeneres | Won |
| 2004 | Las Vegas Film Critics Society | Best Animated Film | | Won |
| 2004 | MTV Movie Awards | Best Comedic Performance | Ellen DeGeneres | Nominated |
| 2004 | MTV Movie Awards | Best Movie | | Nominated |
| 2004 | Motion Picture Sound Editors | Best Sound Editing in Animated Features - Music | Bill Bernstein | Won |
| 2004 | Motion Picture Sound Editors | Best Sound Editing in Feature Film, Animated - Sound | Gary Rydstrom, Michael Silvers, Al Nelson, Shannon Mills, Teresa Eckton, E.J. Holowicki, Dee Selby and Steve Slanec | Nominated |
| 2004 | Online Film Critics Society | Best Animated Feature | | Won |
| 2004 | Phoenix Film Critics Society Awards | Best Animated Film | | Won |
| 2004 | Phoenix Film Critics Society Awards | Best Picture | | Nominated |
| 2004 | Satellite Awards | Best Motion Picture, Animated or Mixed Media | | Nominated |
| 2004 | Satellite Awards | Best Original Score | Thomas Newman | Nominated |
| 2004 | Satellite Awards | Best Youth DVD | | Nominated |
| 2004 | Satellite Awards | Best DVD Extras | | Won |
| 2004 | Saturn Awards | Best Animated Film | | Won |
| 2004 | Saturn Awards | Best DVD Special Edition Release | | Nominated |
| 2004 | Saturn Awards | Best Music | Thomas Newman | Nominated |
| 2004 | Saturn Awards | Best Supporting Actress | Ellen DeGeneres | Won |
| 2004 | Saturn Awards | Best Writing | Andrew Stanton, Bob Peterson and David Reynolds | Nominated |
| 2004 | Science Fiction and Fantasy Writers of America | Best Script | Andrew Stanton, Bob Peterson and David Reynolds | Nominated |
| 2004 | Visual Effects Society Awards | Outstanding Character Animation in an Animated Motion Picture (for "Inside the Whale") | Andrew Gordon and Brett Coderre | Nominated |
| 2004 | Visual Effects Society Awards | Outstanding Character Animation in an Animated Motion Picture (for "Speaking Whale") | David DeVan and Gini Santos | Won |
| 2004 | Young Artist Awards | Best Family Feature Film – Animation | | Won |
| 2004 | Young Artist Awards | Best Performance in a Voice-Over Role – Young Actor | Alexander Gould | Won |
| 2004 | Young Artist Awards | Best Performance in a Voice-Over Role – Young Actress | Erica Beck | Won |

=== The Incredibles ===
The Incredibles was released in November 2004, written and directed by Brad Bird, who was one of the original directors and executive consultants of The Simpsons and the screenwriter/director of the critically acclaimed 1999 animated film The Iron Giant. The Incredibles was originally developed as a traditionally-animated film for Warner Bros., but after the studio shut down its division for fully animated theatrical features, Bird went to Pixar, where he pitched the story and reunited with John Lasseter. The Incredibles is the first Pixar film to win more than one Academy Award.

Awards
| Year | Association | Award Category | Recipient (if any) | Result |
|---|---|---|---|---|
| 2004 | Florida Film Critics Circle Awards | Best Animation | | Won |
| 2004 | Los Angeles Film Critics Association Awards | Best Animation | | Won |
| 2004 | Los Angeles Film Critics Association Awards | Best Score | Michael Giacchino | Won |
| 2004 | National Board of Review | Best Animated Feature | | Won |
| 2004 | New York Film Critics Circle Awards | Best Animated Film | | Won |
| 2004 | Phoenix Film Critics Society Awards | Best Animated Film | | Won |
| 2004 | San Diego Film Critics Society Awards | Best Animated Film | | Won |
| 2004 | Seattle Film Critics Awards | Best Animated Feature | | Won |
| 2004 | Washington D.C. Area Film Critics Association | Best Animated Film | | Won |
| 2005 | ASCAP Film and Television Music Awards | Top Box Office Films of 2005 Award | Michael Giacchino | Won |
| 2005 | Academy Awards | Best Original Screenplay | Brad Bird | Nominated |
| 2005 | Academy Awards | Best Animated Feature | Brad Bird | Won |
| 2005 | Academy Awards | Best Sound Editing | Randy Thom and Michael Silvers | Won |
| 2005 | Academy Awards | Best Sound Mixing | Randy Thom, Gary A. Rizzo and Doc Kane | Nominated |
| 2005 | Academy of Science Fiction, Fantasy and Horror Films | Best Animated Film | | Won |
| 2005 | Academy of Science Fiction, Fantasy and Horror Films | Best Music | Michael Giacchino | Nominated |
| 2005 | Academy of Science Fiction, Fantasy and Horror Films | Best Writer | Brad Bird | Nominated |
| 2005 | American Cinema Editors | Best Edited Feature Film – Comedy or Musical | Stephen Schaffer | Nominated |
| 2005 | Annie Awards | Animated Effects | Martin Ngyuen | Won |
| 2005 | Annie Awards | Best Animated Feature | | Won |
| 2005 | Annie Awards | Character Animation | Angus MacLane | Won |
| 2005 | Annie Awards | Character Animation | John Kahrs | Nominated |
| 2005 | Annie Awards | Character Animation | Peter Sohn | Nominated |
| 2005 | Annie Awards | Character Animation | Kureha Yokoo | Nominated |
| 2005 | Annie Awards | Character Design in an Animated Feature Production | Teddy Newton | Nominated |
| 2005 | Annie Awards | Character Design in an Animated Feature Production | Tony Fucile | Won |
| 2005 | Annie Awards | Directing in an Animated Feature Production | Brad Bird | Won |
| 2005 | Annie Awards | Music in an Animated Feature Production | Michael Giacchino | Won |
| 2005 | Annie Awards | Production Design in an Animated Feature Production | Lou Ramano | Won |
| 2005 | Annie Awards | Storyboarding in an Animated Feature Production | Kevin O'Brien | Won |
| 2005 | Annie Awards | Storyboarding in an Animated Feature Production | Ted Mathot | Nominated |
| 2005 | Annie Awards | Voice Acting in an Animated Feature Production | Brad Bird | Won |
| 2005 | Annie Awards | Voice Acting in an Animated Feature Production | Samuel L. Jackson | Nominated |
| 2005 | Annie Awards | Writing in an Animated Feature Production | Brad Bird | Won |
| 2005 | Art Directors Guild | Feature Film – Period or Fantasy Film | Lou Ramano and Ralph Eggleston | Nominated |
| 2005 | BAFTA Awards | BAFTA Children's Award – Best Feature Film | John Walker and Brad Bird | Won |
| 2005 | BET Comedy Awards | Best Performance in an Animated Theatrical Film | Samuel L. Jackson | Won |
| 2005 | BMI Film & TV Awards | BMI Film Music Award | Michael Giacchino | Won |
| 2005 | Broadcast Film Critics Association Awards | Best Animated Feature | | Won |
| 2005 | Broadcast Film Critics Association Awards | Best Composer | Michael Giacchino | Nominated |
| 2005 | Broadcast Film Critics Association Awards | Best Popular Movie | | Nominated |
| 2005 | Cinema Writers Circle Awards of Spain | Best Foreign Film (Mejor Película Extranjera) | | Nominated |
| 2005 | Dallas-Fort Worth Film Critics Association Awards | Best Animated Film | | Won |
| 2005 | Empire Awards | Best Film | | Nominated |
| 2005 | Golden Globes | Best Picture – Musical or Comedy | | Nominated |
| 2005 | Golden Trailer Awards | Best Animation/Family (for "Buckle Up") | | Won |
| 2005 | Golden Trailer Awards | Best Comedy (for "Buckle Up") | | Nominated |
| 2005 | Hugo Awards | Best Dramatic Presentation – Long Form | | Won |
| 2005 | Kansas City Film Critics Circle Awards | Best Animated Film | | Won |
| 2005 | Kids' Choice Awards | Favorite Movie | | Won |
| 2005 | Las Vegas Film Critics Society | Best Animated Film | | Won |
| 2005 | Las Vegas Film Critics Society | Best Score | Michael Giacchino | Won |
| 2005 | MTV Movie Awards | Best Movie | | Nominated |
| 2005 | MTV Movie Awards | Best On-Screen Team | Craig T. Nelson, Holly Hunter, Spencer Fox and Sarah Vowell | Nominated |
| 2005 | MTV Movie Awards, Mexico | Favorite Voice in an Animated Film | Víctor Trujillo | Nominated |
| 2005 | Motion Picture Sound Editors | Best Sound Editing in Feature Film – Animated | Randy Thom, Michael Silvers, Sue Fox, Teresa Eckton, Will Files, David Acord, Kyrsten Mate Comoglio, E.J. Holowicki, Steve Slanec, Al Nelson and Stephen M. Davis | Won |
| 2005 | Online Film Critics Society | Best Animated Feature | | Won |
| 2005 | Online Film Critics Society | Best Score | Michael Giacchino | Won |
| 2005 | Online Film Critics Society | Best Picture | | Nominated |
| 2005 | Online Film Critics Society | Best Original Screenplay | Brad Bird | Nominated |
| 2005 | PGA Awards | Motion Picture Producer of the Year | | Nominated |
| 2005 | People's Choice Awards | Favorite Animated Movie | | Nominated |
| 2005 | People's Choice Awards | Favorite Motion Picture | | Nominated |
| 2005 | Satellite Awards | Best Motion Picture, Animated or Mixed Media | | Won |
| 2005 | Satellite Awards | Best Score | Michael Giacchino | Nominated |
| 2005 | Teen Choice Awards | Choice Movie: Animated/Computer Generated | | Nominated |
| 2005 | Visual Effects Society Awards | Outstanding Performance by an Animated Character in an Animated Motion Picture (for "Bob Parr/Mr. Incredible") | Craig T. Nelson, Bill Wise, Bill Sheffler and Bolhem Bouchiba | Won |
| 2005 | World Soundtrack Awards | Discovery of the Year | Michael Giacchino | Won |
| 2005 | Young Artist Awards | Best Family Feature Film – Animation | | Won |
| 2005 | Young Artist Awards | Best Performance in a Voice-Over Role – Young Artist | Spencer Fox | Nominated |
| 2006 | Academy of Science Fiction, Fantasy and Horror Films | Best DVD Special Edition Release | | Nominated |
| 2006 | Grammy Awards | Best Instrumental Arrangement | Gordon Goodwin (for "The Incredits") | Won |
| 2006 | Grammy Awards | Best Score Soundtrack Album | Michael Giacchino | Nominated |

=== Cars ===
Cars was released in 2006, directed by both John Lasseter and Joe Ranft. It was the seventh Disney/Pixar feature film, and Pixar's last film before the company was bought by Disney. Set in a world populated entirely by anthropomorphic cars and other vehicles, it features the voices of Owen Wilson, Paul Newman (in his final acting film role), Larry the Cable Guy, Bonnie Hunt, Tony Shalhoub, Cheech Marin, Michael Wallis, George Carlin, Paul Dooley, Jenifer Lewis, Guido Quaroni, Michael Keaton, Katherine Helmond, and John Ratzenberger as well as voice cameos by several celebrities including Jeremy Piven, Richard Petty, Dale Earnhardt Jr., Bob Costas, Darrell Waltrip, Jay Leno, Michael Schumacher, and Mario Andretti.

Awards
| Year | Association | Award Category | Recipient (if any) | Result |
|---|---|---|---|---|
| 2006 | Golden Trailer Awards | Best Animation/Family | | Nominated |
| 2006 | Golden Trailer Awards | Best Voice Over | | Nominated |
| 2006 | Hollywood Film Festival | Best Animation of the Year | John Lasseter | Won |
| 2006 | National Board of Review | Best Animated Feature | | Won |
| 2006 | Satellite Awards | Best Motion Picture, Animated or Mixed Media | | Nominated |
| 2006 | Satellite Awards | Best Youth DVD | | Nominated |
| 2006 | Southeastern Film Critics Association | Best Animated Film | | Won |
| 2006 | World Soundtrack Awards | Best Original Song Written for Film (for "Our Town") | Randy Newman and James Taylor | Won |
| 2007 | Academy Awards | Best Animated Feature | John Lasseter | Nominated |
| 2007 | Academy Awards | Best Original Song (for "Our Town") | Randy Newman | Nominated |
| 2007 | Academy of Science Fiction, Fantasy and Horror Films | Best Animated Film | | Won |
| 2007 | Annie Awards | Best Animated Effects | Keith Klohn | Nominated |
| 2007 | Annie Awards | Best Animated Effects | Erdem Taylan | Nominated |
| 2007 | Annie Awards | Best Animated Feature | | Won |
| 2007 | Annie Awards | Best Character Animation in a Feature Production | Carlos Baena | Nominated |
| 2007 | Annie Awards | Best Character Animation in a Feature Production | Bobby Podesta | Nominated |
| 2007 | Annie Awards | Best Directing in an Animated Feature Production | John Lasseter | Nominated |
| 2007 | Annie Awards | Best Music in an Animated Feature Production | Randy Newman | Won |
| 2007 | Annie Awards | Best Production Design in an Animated Feature Production | William Cone | Nominated |
| 2007 | Annie Awards | Best Writing in an Animated Feature Production | Dan Fogelman | Nominated |
| 2007 | Austin Film Critics Association | Best Animated Film | | Won |
| 2007 | BAFTA Awards | Best Animated Feature Film | John Lasseter | Nominated |
| 2007 | Broadcast Film Critics Association Awards | Best Animated Feature | | Won |
| 2007 | Broadcast Film Critics Association Awards | Best Soundtrack | | Nominated |
| 2007 | Central Ohio Film Critics Association | Best Animated Film | | Won |
| 2007 | Golden Globes | Best Animated Film | | Won |
| 2007 | Grammy Awards | Best Song (for "Our Town") | Randy Newman | Won |
| 2007 | Grammy Awards | Best Compilation Soundtrack Album | Chris Mountain and Randy Newman | Nominated |
| 2007 | Kids' Choice Awards | Favorite Animated Movie | | Nominated |
| 2007 | Motion Picture Sound Editors | Best Sound Editing Sound Effects, Foley, Dialogue and ADR for Feature Film Animation | Tom Myers, Michael Silvers, Jonathan Null, Bruno Coon, Teresa Eckton, Shannon Mills, Dee Selby, Steve Slanec, Christopher Barrick, Jana Vance, Dennie Thorpe and Ellen Heuer | Won |
| 2007 | Online Film Critics Society | Best Animation | | Nominated |
| 2007 | PGA Awards | Motion Picture Producer of the Year, Animated Motion Picture | Darla K. Anderson | Won |
| 2007 | People's Choice Awards | Favorite Family Movie | | Won |
| 2007 | People's Choice Awards | Favorite Movie | | Nominated |
| 2007 | People's Choice Awards | Favorite Song from a Movie (for "Life Is a Highway") | Rascal Flatts | Won |
| 2007 | People's Choice Awards | Favorite Song from a Movie (for "Real Gone") | Sheryl Crow | Nominated |
| 2007 | Satellite Awards | Best Youth DVD (2nd nomination) | | Nominated |
| 2007 | Visual Effects Society Awards | Outstanding Animated Character in an Animated Motion Picture (for "Mater") | Larry the Cable Guy, Michael Krummhoefener, Tom Sanocki and Nancy Kato | Won |

=== Ratatouille ===
Ratatouille is an animated film produced by Pixar and distributed by Walt Disney Pictures. The film was released on June 29, 2007, in the United States as the eighth movie produced by Pixar. It was directed by Brad Bird, who took over from Jan Pinkava in 2005. The plot follows Remy, a rat who dreams of becoming a chef and tries to achieve his goal by forming an alliance with a Parisian restaurant's garbage boy. Ratatouille was released to both critical acclaim and box office success, opening in 3,940 theaters domestically and debuting at No. 1 with $47 million, grossing further $206 million in North America and a total of $620 million worldwide. The film is on the 2007 top ten lists of multiple critics, including Michael Sragow of The Baltimore Sun as number one, A.O. Scott of The New York Times, Carina Chocano of the Los Angeles Times and Joe Morgenstern of The Wall Street Journal as number two.

Accolades received by Ratatouille
| Award | Date of ceremony | Category | Recipient(s) | Result | Ref. |
|---|---|---|---|---|---|
| Academy Awards | February 24, 2008 | Best Original Screenplay | Brad Bird, Jan Pinkava and Jim Capobianco | Nominated | |
| Academy Awards | February 24, 2008 | Best Animated Feature | Brad Bird | Won | |
| Academy Awards | February 24, 2008 | Best Original Score | Michael Giacchino | Nominated | |
| Academy Awards | February 24, 2008 | Best Sound Editing | Randy Thom and Michael Silvers | Nominated | |
| Academy Awards | February 24, 2008 | Best Sound Mixing | Randy Thom, Michael Semanick and Doc Kane | Nominated | |
| American Cinema Editors Eddie Awards | February 17, 2008 | Best Edited Film – Comedy or Musical | Darren T. Holmes | Nominated | |
| American Film Institute Awards | December 8, 2007 | Top 10 Films of the Year | Ratatouille | Won (Note: This award does not have a single winner, but recognizes multiple films.) | |
| Annie Awards | February 8, 2008 | Best Animated Feature | Pixar Animation Studios | Won | |
| Annie Awards | February 8, 2008 | Best Animated Effects | Gary Bruins | Nominated | |
| Annie Awards | February 8, 2008 | Best Animated Effects | Jon Reisch | Nominated | |
| Annie Awards | February 8, 2008 | Character Animation in a Feature Production | Michal Makarewicz | Won | |
| Annie Awards | February 8, 2008 | Best Character Design in an Animated Feature Production | Carter Goodrich | Won | |
| Annie Awards | February 8, 2008 | Best Directing in an Animated Feature Production | Brad Bird | Won | |
| Annie Awards | February 8, 2008 | Best Music in an Animated Feature Production | Michael Giacchino | Won | |
| Annie Awards | February 8, 2008 | Best Production Design in an Animated Feature Production | Harley Jessup | Won | |
| Annie Awards | February 8, 2008 | Best Storyboarding in an Animated Feature Production | Ted Mathot | Won | |
| Annie Awards | February 8, 2008 | Best Voice Acting in an Animated Feature Production | Janeane Garofalo | Nominated | |
| Annie Awards | February 8, 2008 | Best Voice Acting in an Animated Feature Production | Ian Holm | Won | |
| Annie Awards | February 8, 2008 | Best Voice Acting in an Animated Feature Production | Patton Oswalt | Nominated | |
| Annie Awards | February 8, 2008 | Best Writing in an Animated Feature Production | Brad Bird | Won | |
| Art Directors Guild Awards | February 14, 2008 | Excellence in Production Design for a Fantasy Feature Film | Harley Jessup | Nominated | |
| Austin Film Critics Association Awards | December 20, 2007 | Best Animated Film | Ratatouille | Won | |
| Boston Society of Film Critics Awards | December 9, 2007 | Best Screenplay | Brad Bird | Won | |
| British Academy Film Awards | February 10, 2008 | Best Animated Film | Ratatouille | Won | |
| Chicago Film Critics Association Awards | December 13, 2007 | Best Animated Feature | Ratatouille | Won | |
| Chicago Film Critics Association Awards | December 13, 2007 | Best Original Screenplay | Brad Bird | Nominated | |
| Christopher Awards | April 10, 2008 | Feature Films | Ratatouille | Won (Note: Shared with Amazing Grace, The Diving Bell and the Butterfly (film), The Great Debaters, Juno, and The Kite Runner) | |
| Critics' Choice Awards | January 7, 2008 | Best Animated Feature | Ratatouille | Won | |
| Dallas-Fort Worth Film Critics Association Awards | December 17, 2007 | Best Animated Feature | Ratatouille | Won | |
| Empire Awards | March 9, 2008 | Best Film | Ratatouille | Nominated | |
| Empire Awards | March 9, 2008 | Best Comedy | Ratatouille | Nominated | |
| Florida Film Critics Circle Awards | December 12, 2007 | Best Animated Film | Ratatouille | Won | |
| Golden Globe Awards | January 13, 2008 | Best Animated Film | Ratatouille | Won | |
| Golden Reel Awards | February 21, 2008 | Best Sound Effects, Foley, Dialogue and ADR for Feature Film Animation | Randy Thom, Michael Silvers, Teresa Eckton, Kyrsten Mate, Steve Slanec, Sue Fox, Al Nelson, Stephen M. Davis, Dennie Thorpe, Jana Vance, Ellen Heuer | Won | |
| Golden Trailer Awards | May 8, 2008 | Best Animation/Family TV Spot | Walt Disney Pictures and Craig Murray Productions (for "One Word Kids") | Nominated | |
| Grammy Awards | February 10, 2008 | Best Score Soundtrack Album | Michael Giacchino | Won | |
| Hollywood Film Awards | October 27, 2007 | Animation of the Year | Ratatouille | Won | |
| Hollywood Film Awards | October 27, 2007 | Movie of the Year | Ratatouille | Nominated | |
| International Cinephile Society Awards | February 12, 2008 | Best Animated Film | Ratatouille | Runner-up | |
| Kansas City Film Critics Circle Awards | January 12, 2008 | Best Animated Film | Ratatouille | Won | |
| Kids' Choice Awards | March 29, 2008 | Favorite Animated Movie | Ratatouille | Won | |
| Los Angeles Film Critics Association Awards | December 9, 2007 | Best Animated Film | Ratatouille | Won (Note: Tied with Persepolis) | |
| National Board of Review Awards | December 5, 2007 | Best Animated Feature | Ratatouille | Won | |
| Online Film Critics Society Awards | January 9, 2008 | Best Animated Film | Ratatouille | Won | |
| Online Film Critics Society Awards | January 9, 2008 | Best Original Screenplay | Brad Bird | Nominated | |
| People's Choice Awards | January 8, 2008 | Favorite Family Movie | Ratatouille | Nominated | |
| Producers Guild of America Awards | February 2, 2008 | Producer of the Year Award in Animated Motion Pictures | Brad Lewis | Won | |
| San Diego Film Critics Society Awards | December 18, 2007 | Best Animated Film | Ratatouille | Won | |
| Satellite Awards | December 17, 2007 | Best Motion Picture, Animated or Mixed Media | Ratatouille | Won | |
| Satellite Awards | December 17, 2007 | Best Original Score | Michael Giacchino | Nominated | |
| Satellite Awards | December 17, 2007 | Outstanding Youth DVD | Ratatouille | Won | |
| Saturn Awards | June 24, 2008 | Best Animated Film | Ratatouille | Won | |
| Saturn Awards | June 24, 2008 | Best Writing | Brad Bird | Won | |
| St. Louis Film Critics Association Awards | December 21, 2007 | Best Animated or Children's Film | Ratatouille | Won | |
| Toronto Film Critics Association Awards | December 18, 2007 | Best Animated Film | Ratatouille | Won | |
| Visual Effects Society Awards | February 10, 2008 | Outstanding Performance by an Animated Character in an Animated Motion Picture | Janeane Garofalo, Jaime Landes, Konishi Sonoko and Paul Aichele (for "Colette") | Won | |
| Visual Effects Society Awards | February 10, 2008 | Outstanding Effects in an Animated Motion Picture | Darwyn Peachey, Chen Shen, Eric Froemling & Tolga Goktekin (for "Rapids") | Nominated | |
| Visual Effects Society Awards | February 10, 2008 | Outstanding Effects in an Animated Motion Picture | Jon Reisch, Jason Johnston, Eric Froemling & Tolga Goktekin (for "Food") | Won | |
| Visual Effects Society Awards | February 10, 2008 | Outstanding Supporting Visual Effects in a Motion Picture | Michael Fong, Apurva Shah, Christine Waggoner and Michael Fu | Won | |
| Washington D.C. Area Film Critics Association Awards | December 10, 2007 | Best Animated Feature | Ratatouille | Won | |
| World Soundtrack Awards | October 20, 2007 | Best Original Song | Michael Giacchino & Camille (for "Le Festin") | Nominated | |
| Young Artist Awards | March 30, 2008 | Best Family Feature Film (Animation) | Ratatouille | Won | |

=== WALL-E ===
WALL-E (promoted with an interpunct as WALL·E) was released in 2008 and directed by Andrew Stanton. It follows the story of a robot named WALL-E who is designed to clean up a polluted Earth far in the future. He eventually falls in love with another robot named EVE, and follows her into outer space on an adventure.

After directing Finding Nemo, Stanton felt Pixar had created believable simulations of underwater physics and was willing to direct a film set in space. Most of the characters do not have actual human voices, but instead communicate with body language and robotic sounds, designed by Ben Burtt, that resemble voices. In addition, it is the first animated feature by Pixar to have segments featuring live-action characters.

Walt Disney Pictures released it in the United States and Canada on June 27, 2008. The film grossed $23.1 million on its opening day, and $63 million during its opening weekend in 3,992 theaters, ranking #1 at the box office. This ranks the third highest-grossing opening weekend for a Pixar film as of July 2008. Following Pixar tradition, WALL-E was paired with a short film, Presto, for its theatrical release. WALL-E has achieved highly positive reviews with an approval rating of 96% on the review aggregator Rotten Tomatoes. It grossed $533 million worldwide, won the 2009 Best Animated Film Golden Globe Award and won the Academy Award for Best Animated Feature. It was nominated for a total of six Academy Awards, making it the most nominated Pixar film.

It was nominated for the 2009 Kids' Choice Awards.

Accolades received by WALL-E
| Award | Date of ceremony | Category | Recipients | Result |
|---|---|---|---|---|
| Academy Awards | February 22, 2009 | Best Original Screenplay | Andrew Stanton (screenplay/story), Jim Reardon (screenplay), Pete Docter (story) | Nominated |
| Academy Awards | February 22, 2009 | Best Animated Feature | Andrew Stanton | Won |
| Academy Awards | February 22, 2009 | Best Original Score | Thomas Newman | Nominated |
| Academy Awards | February 22, 2009 | Best Original Song | Peter Gabriel (music and lyrics), Thomas Newman (music) ("Down to Earth") | Nominated |
| Academy Awards | February 22, 2009 | Best Sound Editing | Ben Burtt, Matthew Wood | Nominated |
| Academy Awards | February 22, 2009 | Best Sound Mixing | Tom Myers, Michael Semanick, Ben Burtt | Nominated |
| American Cinema Editors | February 15, 2009 | Best Edited Feature Film – Comedy or Musical | Stephen Schaffer | Won |
| Alliance of Women Film Journalists Awards | December 15, 2008 | Best Original Screenplay | Andrew Stanton (story/screenplay), Jim Reardon (screenplay), Pete Docter (story) | Won |
| The 14th Animation Kobe | October 18, 2009 | Theatrical Film Award | Andrew Stanton | Won |
| Annie Awards | January 30, 2009 | Animated Effects | Enrique Vila | Nominated |
| Annie Awards | January 30, 2009 | Best Animated Feature | Jim Morris | Nominated |
| Annie Awards | January 30, 2009 | Character Animation in a Feature Production | Victor Navone | Nominated |
| Annie Awards | January 30, 2009 | Directing in an Animated Feature Production | Andrew Stanton | Nominated |
| Annie Awards | January 30, 2009 | Production Design in an Animated Feature Production | Ralph Eggleston | Nominated |
| Annie Awards | January 30, 2009 | Storyboarding in an Animated Feature Production | Ronnie del Carmen | Nominated |
| Annie Awards | January 30, 2009 | Voice Acting in an Animated Feature Production | Ben Burtt (as WALL-E) | Nominated |
| Art Directors Guild Awards | February 14, 2009 | Excellence in Production Design for a Fantasy Film | Ralph Eggleston | Nominated |
| Boston Society of Film Critics | February 8, 2009 | Best Film | | Won (Note: Tied with Slumdog Millionaire) |
| Boston Society of Film Critics | February 8, 2009 | Best Animated Film | | Won |
| British Academy of Film and Television Arts | February 8, 2009 | Best Animated Film | Andrew Stanton | Won |
| British Academy of Film and Television Arts | February 8, 2009 | Best Film Music | Thomas Newman | Nominated |
| British Academy of Film and Television Arts | February 8, 2009 | Best Sound | Ben Burtt, Tom Myers, Michael Semanick, Matthew Wood | Nominated |
| British Academy Children's Awards | 2008 | Best Feature Film | Jim Morris, Andrew Stanton | Won |
| Broadcast Film Critics Association | January 8, 2009 | Best Animated Feature | Andrew Stanton | Won |
| Broadcast Film Critics Association | January 8, 2009 | Best Picture | Jim Morris | Nominated |
| Broadcast Film Critics Association | January 8, 2009 | Best Song | Thomas Newman, Peter Gabriel (for "Down to Earth") | Nominated |
| Chicago Film Critics Association | December 18, 2008 | Best Picture | | Won |
| Chicago Film Critics Association | December 18, 2008 | Best Animated Feature | | Won |
| Chicago Film Critics Association | December 18, 2008 | Best Director | Andrew Stanton | Nominated |
| Chicago Film Critics Association | December 18, 2008 | Best Original Screenplay | Andrew Stanton, Jim Reardon | Won |
| Chicago Film Critics Association | December 18, 2008 | Best Original Score | Thomas Newman | Won |
| Cinema Audio Society Awards | February 14, 2009 | Outstanding Achievement in Sound Mixing for Motion Pictures | Ben Burtt, Tom Myers, Michael Semanick | Nominated |
| Dallas-Fort Worth Film Critics Association Award | December 17, 2008 | Best Animated Film | | Won |
| Florida Film Critics Circle Award | December 18, 2008 | Best Animated Feature | | Won |
| Golden Globe Awards | January 11, 2009 | Best Original Song | Peter Gabriel, Thomas Newman (for "Down to Earth") | Nominated |
| Golden Globe Awards | January 11, 2009 | Best Animated Film | Andrew Stanton | Won |
| Grammy Awards | February 8, 2009 | Best Score Soundtrack Album for Motion Picture, Television or Other Visual Media | Thomas Newman | Nominated |
| Grammy Awards | February 8, 2009 | Best Song Written for Motion Picture, Television or Other Visual Media | Thomas Newman, Peter Gabriel (for "Down to Earth") | Won |
| Grammy Awards | February 8, 2009 | Best Instrumental Arrangement | Thomas Newman, Peter Gabriel (for "Define Dancing") | Won |
| Hollywood Film Festival | October 27, 2008 | Animation of the Year | Andrew Stanton | Won |
| Hugo Awards | August 8, 2009 | Best Dramatic Presentation, Long Form | Andrew Stanton & Pete Docter (story), Andrew Stanton & Jim Reardon (screenplay), Andrew Stanton (director) | Won |
| International Film Music Critics Association | February 20, 2009 | Film Score of the Year | Thomas Newman | Nominated |
| International Film Music Critics Association | February 20, 2009 | Film Composer of the Year | Thomas Newman | Nominated |
| International Film Music Critics Association | February 20, 2009 | Best Original Score for an Animated Feature | Thomas Newman | Won |
| International Film Music Critics Association | February 20, 2009 | Film Composition of the Year | Thomas Newman and Peter Gabriel (for Define Dancing) | Nominated |
| Kids' Choice Awards | March 28, 2009 | Favorite Animated Movie | Andrew Stanton | Nominated |
| Los Angeles Film Critics | December 9, 2008 | Best Film | | Won |
| Motion Picture Sound Editors | February 21, 2009 | Best Sound Editing: Sound Effects, Foley, Music, Dialogue and ADR Animation in a Feature Film | | Won |
| National Board of Review | December 4, 2008 | Top Ten Films | | Won |
| National Board of Review | December 4, 2008 | Best Animated Feature | | Won |
| National Movie Awards | 2008 | Best Family Film | | Won |
| National Movie Awards | 2008 | Special Honorary Award | Pixar | Won |
| Nebula Awards | April 25, 2009 | Best Script | Andrew Stanton, Jim Reardon | Won |
| New York Film Critics | December 10, 2008 | Best Animated Film | | Won |
| Online Film Critics Society | January 19, 2009 | Best Picture | | Won |
| Online Film Critics Society | January 19, 2009 | Best Animated Feature | | Won |
| Online Film Critics Society | January 19, 2009 | Best Director | Andrew Stanton | Nominated |
| Online Film Critics Society | January 19, 2009 | Best Original Screenplay | Andrew Stanton & Jim Reardon | Won |
| Online Film Critics Society | January 19, 2009 | Best Original Score | Thomas Newman | Nominated |
| Online Film Critics Society | January 19, 2009 | Best Editing | Stephen Schaffer | Nominated |
| People's Choice Awards | January 7, 2009 | Favorite Family Movie | | Won |
| Producers Guild of America | January 24, 2009 | Animated Theatrical Motion Pictures | Jim Morris | Won |
| San Diego Film Critics Society | December 15, 2008 | Best Animated Feature | | Won |
| Satellite Awards | December 14, 2008 | Best Animated or Mixed Media Feature | | Won |
| Satellite Awards | December 14, 2008 | Best Original Score | Thomas Newman | Nominated |
| Satellite Awards | December 14, 2008 | Best Original Song | Peter Gabriel, Thomas Newman (for "Down to Earth") | Nominated |
| Satellite Awards | December 14, 2008 | Best Sound | Ben Burtt, Matthew Wood | Nominated |
| Saturn Awards | June 25, 2009 | Best Animated Film | | Won |
| Saturn Awards | June 25, 2009 | Best Director | Andrew Stanton | Nominated |
| Scream Awards | October 21, 2008 | Best Science Fiction Movie | | Nominated |
| Scream Awards | October 21, 2008 | Breakout Performance | WALL-E | Won |
| Scream Awards | October 21, 2008 | Best Scream-Play | Andrew Stanton (story/screenplay), Jim Reardon (screenplay), and Pete Docter (story) | Nominated |
| Teen Choice Awards | August 3, 2008 | Best Summer Comedy Movie | | Nominated |
| Toronto Film Critics Association | December 17, 2008 | Best Picture | | Nominated |
| Toronto Film Critics Association | December 17, 2008 | Best Animated Film | | Won |
| Toronto Film Critics Association | December 17, 2008 | Best Director | Andrew Stanton | Nominated |
| Visual Effects Society | February 21, 2009 | Outstanding Animated Character in an Animated Motion Picture | Ben Burtt, Victor Navone, William Austin Lee, Jay Shuster (WALL-E) | Won |
| Visual Effects Society | February 21, 2009 | Outstanding Animation in an Animated Motion Picture | Andrew Stanton, Jim Morris, Lindsey Collins, Nigel Hardwidge | Won |
| Visual Effects Society | February 21, 2009 | Outstanding Effects Animation in an Animated Feature Motion Picture | Jason Johnston, Keith Daniel Klohn, Enrique Vila, Bill Watral | Won |
| Women Film Critics Circle | January 8, 2009 | Best Family Film | | Won |
| Women Film Critics Circle | January 8, 2009 | Best Animated Female | Elissa Knight (EVE) | Won |
| World Soundtrack Awards | 2008 | Best Original Score of the Year | Thomas Newman | Nominated |
| World Soundtrack Awards | 2008 | Best Original Song Written Directly for Film | Thomas Newman, Peter Gabriel (for "Down to Earth") | Won |

=== Up ===
Up is a 2009 animated film produced by Pixar Animation Studios and distributed by Walt Disney Pictures. The film premiered on May 29, 2009, in North America, and opened the 2009 Cannes Film Festival, becoming the first animated and 3D film to do so. It was directed by Pete Docter, co-directed by Bob Peterson, and produced by Jonas Rivera. The film centers on an elderly widower, named Carl Fredricksen, and a young Wilderness Explorer, named Russell, who fly to South America in a house suspended by helium balloons. The film was released with both critical acclaim and box office success, opening in 3,766 theaters domestically, debuting at #1 with $68.1 million, and grossing $735 million worldwide. and receiving the Golden Tomato, from the website Rotten Tomatoes, for highest rating feature in 2009, with an approval of 98% from film critics, based on 259 reviews.

It garnered various awards and nominations, most of them for the "Best Animated Picture" category and for the film's score. Up was nominated for five Academy Awards at the 2010 Ceremony, winning two of them, for Best Animated Feature and for Best Original Score. It is the second fully animated film to be nominated for Best Picture, the other being Beauty and the Beast, and also become the third consecutive Pixar film to win the Academy Award for Animated Feature, after Ratatouille and WALL-E. The film also won the Golden Globe for Best Original Score and the Best Animated Feature Film at the 67th Golden Globe Awards. The movie received nine nominations for the Annie Awards in eight categories, winning two awards for Best Animated Feature and Best Directing in a Feature Production. It also was selected as the Summer Movie Comedy at the 2009 Teen Choice Awards, and was also nominated for three Grammys at 52nd Grammy Awards, winning two of them. Rivera received the Motion Pictures Motion Picture Producer of the Year Award, for Animated Theatrical Motion Pictures, given by the Producers Guild of America, while Docter and Peterson were honored by the British Academy Film Awards with the BAFTA Award for Best Animated Film, and Giacchino the BAFTA Award for Best Film Music. Furthermore, the film was nominated at the 2009 Satellite Awards in the categories "Best Animated or Mixed Media Film," "Best Original Screenplay" and "Best Original Score." It also won Favorite Animated Movie at the 2010 Kids' Choice Awards.

| Award | Date of ceremony | Category | Recipients | Result | Ref. |
|---|---|---|---|---|---|
| Academy Awards | March 7, 2010 | Best Picture | Jonas Rivera | Nominated | |
| Academy Awards | March 7, 2010 | Best Original Screenplay | Pete Docter (screenplay/story), Bob Peterson (screenplay/story), and Tom McCarthy (story) | Nominated | |
| Academy Awards | March 7, 2010 | Best Animated Feature | Pete Docter | Won | |
| Academy Awards | March 7, 2010 | Best Original Score | Michael Giacchino | Won | |
| Academy Awards | March 7, 2010 | Best Sound Editing | Tom Myers and Michael Silvers | Nominated | |
| Annie Awards | February 6, 2010 | Best Animated Feature | Pete Docter and Bob Peterson | Won | |
| Annie Awards | February 6, 2010 | Best Animated Effects | Eric Froemling | Nominated | |
| Annie Awards | February 6, 2010 | Best Character Animation in a Feature Production | Daniel Nguyen | Nominated | |
| Annie Awards | February 6, 2010 | Best Character Design in a Feature Production | Daniel López Muñoz | Nominated | |
| Annie Awards | February 6, 2010 | Best Directing in a Feature Production | Pete Docter | Won | |
| Annie Awards | February 6, 2010 | Best Music in a Feature Production | Michael Giacchino | Nominated | |
| Annie Awards | February 6, 2010 | Best Storyboarding in a Feature Production | Ronnie Del Carmen | Nominated | |
| Annie Awards | February 6, 2010 | Best Storyboarding in a Feature Production | Peter Sohn | Nominated | |
| Annie Awards | February 6, 2010 | Best Writing in a Feature Production | Pete Docter, Tom McCarthy, and Bob Peterson | Nominated | |
| Artios Awards | November 2, 2009 | Outstanding Achievement in Casting – Animation Feature | Natalie Lyon and Kevin Reher | Won | |
| Austin Film Critics Award | December 15, 2009 | Best Animated Film | | Won | |
| Austin Film Critics Award | December 15, 2009 | Best Music | Michael Giacchino | Won | |
| British Academy Film Awards | February 21, 2010 | Best Animated Film | Pete Docter and Bob Peterson | Won | |
| British Academy Film Awards | February 21, 2010 | Best Film Music | Michael Giacchino | Won | |
| British Academy Film Awards | February 21, 2010 | Best Original Screenplay | Pete Docter and Bob Peterson | Nominated | |
| British Academy Film Awards | February 21, 2010 | Best Sound | Tom Myers, Michael Semanick, and Michael Silvers | Nominated | |
| Chicago Film Critics Association Awards | December 21, 2009 | Best Animated Feature | | Won | |
| Chicago Film Critics Association Awards | December 21, 2009 | Best Original Score | Michael Giacchino | Won | |
| Chicago Film Critics Association Awards | December 21, 2009 | Best Original Screenplay | Bob Peterson | Nominated | |
| Columbus Film Critics Association Awards | January 7, 2010 | Best Score | Michael Giacchino | Won | |
| Columbus Film Critics Association Awards | January 7, 2010 | Best Animated Feature | Up | Won | |
| Critics Choice Awards | January 15, 2010 | Best Animated Feature | | Won | |
| Critics Choice Awards | January 15, 2010 | Best Picture | | Nominated | |
| Critics Choice Awards | January 15, 2010 | Best Score | Michael Giacchino | Won | |
| Critics Choice Awards | January 15, 2010 | Best Original Screenplay | Pete Docter and Bob Peterson | Nominated | |
| Dallas-Fort Worth Film Critics Association Awards | December 16, 2009 | Best Animated Film | | Won | |
| Eddie Awards | February 14, 2010 | Best Edited Animated Feature Film | Kevin Nolting | Won | |
| East West Players | April 19, 2010 | Breakout Performance Award | Jordan Nagai | Won | |
| East West Players | April 19, 2010 | EWP Visionary Award | Pixar | Won | |
| Florida Film Critics Circle Awards | December 21, 2009 | Best Animated Feature | | Won | |
| Golden Eagle Award | January 21, 2011 | Best Foreign Language Film | Up | Nominated | |
| Golden Globe Awards | January 17, 2010 | Best Animated Feature Film | Pete Docter and Bob Peterson | Won | |
| Golden Globe Awards | January 17, 2010 | Best Original Score | Michael Giacchino | Won | |
| Golden Reel Awards | February 20, 2010 | Best Sound Editing – Sound Effects, Foley, Music, Dialogue and ADR Animation in a Feature Film | | Won | |
| Golden Tomatoes Awards | January 10, 2010 | Wide Release | | Won | |
| Grammy Awards | January 31, 2010 | Best Instrumental Arrangement | Michael Giacchino and Tim Simonec | Nominated | |
| Grammy Awards | January 31, 2010 | Best Instrumental Composition | Michael Giacchino | Won | |
| Grammy Awards | January 31, 2010 | Best Score Soundtrack Album | Michael Giacchino | Won | |
| Hugo Awards | September 5, 2010 | Best Dramatic Presentation, Long Form | Pete Docter, Tom McCarthy, and Bob Peterson | Nominated | |
| Irish Film and Television Awards | February 20, 2010 | Best International Film | | Nominated | |
| Kansas City Film Critics Circle Awards | January 3, 2010 | Best Animated Film | | Won | |
| National Board of Review of Motion Pictures Awards | January 14, 2010 | Best Animated Feature | | Won | |
| Nickelodeon Kids' Choice Awards | March 27, 2010 | Favorite Animated Movie | | Won | |
| Online Film Critics Society Awards | January 6, 2010 | Best Animated Film | Pete Docter | Won | |
| Online Film Critics Society Awards | January 6, 2010 | Best Original Score | Michael Giacchino | Won | |
| Online Film Critics Society Awards | January 6, 2010 | Best Picture | | Nominated | |
| Online Film Critics Society Awards | January 6, 2010 | Best Original Screenplay | Bob Peterson | Nominated | |
| Palm Dog Award | May 22, 2009 | Best Canine Performance during the Cannes Film Festival | "Dug" | Won | |
| Phoenix Film Critics Society Awards | December 22, 2009 | Best Animated Film | | Won | |
| Phoenix Film Critics Society Awards | December 22, 2009 | Best Original Score | Michael Giacchino | Won | |
| Phoenix Film Critics Society Awards | December 22, 2009 | Best Screenplay Written Directly for the Screen | Pete Docter and Bob Peterson | Won | |
| Producers Guild of America Award | January 24, 2010 | Animated Theatrical Motion Pictures | Jonas Rivera | Won | |
| Producers Guild of America Award | January 24, 2010 | Theatrical Motion Pictures | Jonas Rivera | Nominated | |
| Satellite Awards | December 20, 2009 | Best Animated or Mixed Media Feature | Pete Docter and Bob Peterson | Nominated | |
| Satellite Awards | December 20, 2009 | Best Original Screenplay | Pete Docter and Bob Peterson | Nominated | |
| Satellite Awards | December 20, 2009 | Best Original Score | Michael Giacchino | Nominated | |
| Saturn Awards | June 24, 2010 | Best Animated Film | Pete Docter | Nominated | |
| Saturn Awards | June 24, 2010 | Best Music | Michael Giacchino | Nominated | |
| Southeastern Film Critics Association Awards | December 13, 2009 | Best Animated Feature | | Won | |
| Teen Choice Awards | August 9, 2009 | Choice Summer Movie: Comedy | | Won | |
| Visual Effects Society | February 10, 2010 | Outstanding Animation in an Animated Feature Motion Picture | Gary Bruins, Pete Docter, Steve May, and Jonas Rivera | Won | |
| Visual Effects Society | February 10, 2010 | Outstanding Animated Character in an Animated Feature Motion Picture | Ed Asner, Carmen Ngai, Brian Tindall, and Ron Zorman | Won | |
| Visual Effects Society | February 10, 2010 | Outstanding Effects Animation in an Animated Feature Motion Picture | Alexis Angelidis, Eric Froemling, Jason Johnston, and Jon Reisch | Won | |
| Washington D.C. Area Film Critics Association Awards | December 7, 2009 | Best Animated Feature | | Won | |
| Washington D.C. Area Film Critics Association Awards | December 7, 2009 | Best Film | | Nominated | |
| Washington D.C. Area Film Critics Association Awards | December 7, 2009 | Best Original Screenplay | Pete Docter and Bob Peterson | Nominated | |
| Women Film Critics Circle | December 9, 2009 | Best Family Film | | Won | |

=== Toy Story 3 ===
Toy Story 3 is an animated film produced by Pixar and distributed by Walt Disney Pictures. The film was produced by Darla K. Anderson and directed by Lee Unkrich. The film stars Tom Hanks as Sheriff Woody and Tim Allen as Buzz Lightyear. The film also stars Joan Cusack, Don Rickles, Estelle Harris, Blake Clark, Ned Beatty, John Ratzenberger, Wallace Shawn, and Michael Keaton.

The film opened on June 18, 2010, to receive universal acclaim and box office success, grossing $1.067 billion; it is the 30th highest-grossing film of all time, the fifth highest-grossing animated film of all time, and Pixar's second highest-grossing film of all time.

Accolades received by Toy Story 3
| Award | Date of ceremony | Category | Recipient(s) | Result | Ref. |
|---|---|---|---|---|---|
| 3D Creative Arts Awards | February 9, 2011 | Favorite 3D Animated Movie | Toy Story 3 | Won | |
| Academy Awards | February 27, 2011 | Best Picture | Darla K. Anderson | Nominated | |
| Academy Awards | February 27, 2011 | Best Adapted Screenplay | Michael Arndt, John Lasseter, Andrew Stanton, and Lee Unkrich | Nominated | |
| Academy Awards | February 27, 2011 | Best Animated Feature | Lee Unkrich | Won | |
| Academy Awards | February 27, 2011 | Best Sound Editing | Tom Myers and Michael Silvers | Nominated | |
| Academy Awards | February 27, 2011 | Best Original Song | Randy Newman for "We Belong Together" | Won | |
| Alliance of Women Film Journalists Awards | December 24, 2010 | Best Animated Feature | Toy Story 3 | Won | |
| Alliance of Women Film Journalists Awards | December 24, 2010 | Best Animated Female | Jodi Benson | Nominated | |
| Alliance of Women Film Journalists Awards | December 24, 2010 | Best Animated Female | Joan Cusack | Nominated | |
| American Cinema Editors Awards | February 19, 2011 | Best Edited Animated Feature Film | Ken Schretzmann and Lee Unkrich | Won | |
| American Film Institute Awards | December 12, 2010 | Top 10 Films of the Year | Toy Story 3 | Won (Note: This award does not have a single winner, but recognizes multiple films.) | |
| Annie Awards | February 5, 2011 | Best Animated Feature | Toy Story 3 | Nominated | |
| Annie Awards | February 5, 2011 | Outstanding Achievement for Directing in a Feature Production | Lee Unkrich | Nominated | |
| Annie Awards | February 5, 2011 | Outstanding Achievement for Writing in a Feature Production | Michael Arndt | Nominated | |
| Artios Awards | September 26, 2011 | Animation | Kevin Reher and Natalie Lyon | Won | |
| ASCAP Awards | June 23, 2011 | Top Box Office Films | Randy Newman | Won | |
| Austin Film Critics Association Awards | December 22, 2010 | Top 10 Films | Toy Story 3 | Won | |
| Austin Film Critics Association Awards | December 22, 2010 | Best Animated Film | Toy Story 3 | Won | |
| British Academy Children's Awards | November 28, 2010 | Feature Film | Darla K. Anderson, Lee Unkrich, and Michael Arndt | Nominated | |
| British Academy Children's Awards | November 28, 2010 | Kid's Vote — Film | Toy Story 3 | Nominated | |
| British Academy Film Awards | February 13, 2011 | Best Adapted Screenplay | Michael Arndt | Nominated | |
| British Academy Film Awards | February 13, 2011 | Best Animated Film | Lee Unkrich | Won | |
| British Academy Film Awards | February 13, 2011 | Best Special Visual Effects | Guido Quaroni | Nominated | |
| Boston Society of Film Critics Awards | December 12, 2010 | Best Film | Toy Story 3 | Runner-up | |
| Boston Society of Film Critics Awards | December 12, 2010 | Best Animated Film | Toy Story 3 | Won | |
| Chicago Film Critics Association Awards | December 20, 2010 | Best Animated Film | Toy Story 3 | Won | |
| Chicago Film Critics Association Awards | December 20, 2010 | Best Adapted Screenplay | Michael Arndt | Nominated | |
| The Comedy Awards | March 26, 2011 | Best Animated Comedy Movie | Toy Story 3 | Won | |
| Critics' Choice Movie Awards | January 14, 2011 | Best Picture | Toy Story 3 | Nominated | |
| Critics' Choice Movie Awards | January 14, 2011 | Best Adapted Screenplay | Michael Arndt | Nominated | |
| Critics' Choice Movie Awards | January 14, 2011 | Best Animated Feature | Toy Story 3 | Won | |
| Critics' Choice Movie Awards | January 14, 2011 | Best Sound | Randy Newman | Nominated | |
| Critics' Choice Movie Awards | January 14, 2011 | Best Song | Randy Newman for "We Belong Together" | Nominated | |
| Dallas–Fort Worth Film Critics Association Awards | December 17, 2010 | Best Animated Film | Toy Story 3 | Won | |
| Dorian Awards | January 18, 2011 | Film of the Year | Toy Story 3 | Nominated | |
| Dublin Film Critics' Circle Awards | December 31, 2010 | Top Ten Films | Toy Story 3 | 3rd place | |
| Empire Awards | March 27, 2011 | Best Comedy | Toy Story 3 | Nominated | |
| Florida Film Critics Circle Awards | December 20, 2010 | Best Animated Film | Toy Story 3 | Won | |
| Golden Globe Awards | January 16, 2011 | Best Animated Feature Film | Toy Story 3 | Won | |
| Golden Reel Awards | February 20, 2011 | Outstanding Achievement in Sound Editing – Sound Effects, Foley, Dialogue and ADR for Animated Feature Film | Toy Story 3 | Nominated | |
| Golden Trailer Awards | June 10, 2010 | Summer 2010 Blockbuster | "New Story" (CMP) | Nominated | |
| Golden Trailer Awards | June 29, 2011 | Best Animation/Family TV Spot | "Biggest Ever/Clothes" (MOCEAN) | Nominated | |
| Grammy Awards | February 13, 2011 | Best Score Soundtrack for Visual Media | Randy Newman | Won | |
| Hollywood Film Awards | October 26, 2010 | Hollywood Movie Award | Toy Story 3 | Nominated | |
| Hollywood Film Awards | October 26, 2010 | Hollywood Animation Award | Lee Unkrich | Won | |
| Hollywood Post Alliance Awards | November 11, 2010 | Outstanding Editing – Feature Film | Ken Schretzmann and Lee Unkrich | Nominated | |
| Hollywood Post Alliance Awards | November 11, 2010 | Outstanding Sound – Feature Film | Tom Myers, Michael Silvers, and Michael Semanick | Nominated | |
| Houston Film Critics Society Awards | December 18, 2010 | Best Picture | Toy Story 3 | Nominated | |
| Houston Film Critics Society Awards | December 18, 2010 | Best Animated Film | Toy Story 3 | Won | |
| Houston Film Critics Society Awards | December 18, 2010 | Best Screenplay | John Lasseter, Andrew Stanton, Lee Unkrich, and Michael Arndt | Nominated | |
| Hugo Awards | August 20, 2011 | Best Dramatic Presentation, Long Form | Michael Arndt, John Lasseter, Andrew Stanton, and Lee Unkrich | Nominated | |
| ICG Publicists Awards | February 25, 2011 | Maxwell Weinberg Publicists Showmanship Motion Picture Award | Toy Story 3 | Nominated | |
| International Cinephile Society Awards | February 18, 2011 | Best Animated Film | Toy Story 3 | Nominated | |
| International Film Music Critics Association Awards | February 24, 2011 | Best Original Score for an Animated Film | Randy Newman | Nominated | |
| Irish Film & Television Awards | February 12, 2011 | Best International Film | Toy Story 3 | Nominated | |
| Japan Academy Film Prize | February 18, 2011 | Outstanding Foreign Language Film | Toy Story 3 | Nominated | |
| Kansas City Film Critics Circle Awards | January 2, 2011 | Best Animated Feature | Toy Story 3 | Won | |
| London Film Critics' Circle Awards | February 11, 2011 | Film of the Year | Toy Story 3 | Nominated | |
| Los Angeles Film Critics Association Awards | December 12, 2010 | Best Animated Film | Toy Story 3 | Won | |
| Movieguide Awards | February 18, 2011 | Best Movies for Families | Toy Story 3 | Won | |
| MTV Movie Awards | June 5, 2011 | Best Villain | Ned Beatty | Nominated | |
| National Board of Review Awards | December 2, 2010 | Best Animated Film | Toy Story 3 | Won | |
| National Board of Review Awards | December 2, 2010 | Top Ten Films | Toy Story 3 | Won | |
| National Movie Awards | May 26, 2010 | Most Anticipated Movie Of The Summer | Toy Story 3 | Nominated | |
| Nebula Awards | May 21, 2011 | Ray Bradbury Nebula Award for Outstanding Dramatic Presentation | Lee Unkrich, Michael Arndt, John Lasseter, and Andrew Stanton | Nominated | |
| New York Film Critics Online Awards | December 12, 2010 | Best Animated Feature | Toy Story 3 | Won | |
| Nickelodeon Kids' Choice Awards (Australia) | October 8, 2010 | Fave Movie | Toy Story 3 | Nominated | |
| Nickelodeon Kids' Choice Awards (United States) | April 2, 2011 | Favorite Animated Movie | Toy Story 3 | Nominated | |
| Nickelodeon Kids' Choice Awards (United States) | April 2, 2011 | Favorite Voice from an Animated Movie | Tom Hanks | Nominated | |
| Nickelodeon Kids' Choice Awards (United States) | April 2, 2011 | Favorite Voice from an Animated Movie | Tim Allen | Nominated | |
| Online Film Critics Society Awards | January 3, 2011 | Best Picture | Toy Story 3 | Nominated | |
| Online Film Critics Society Awards | January 3, 2011 | Best Animated Film | Toy Story 3 | Won | |
| People's Choice Awards | January 5, 2011 | Favorite Movie | Toy Story 3 | Nominated | |
| People's Choice Awards | January 5, 2011 | Favorite Family Movie | Toy Story 3 | Won | |
| Producers Guild of America Awards | January 22, 2011 | Best Theatrical Motion Picture | Darla K. Anderson | Nominated | |
| Producers Guild of America Awards | January 22, 2011 | Best Animated Motion Picture | Darla K. Anderson | Won | |
| San Diego Film Critics Society Awards | December 14, 2010 | Best Animated Feature | Toy Story 3 | Won | |
| San Diego Film Critics Society Awards | December 14, 2010 | Best Original Screenplay | Michael Arndt | Nominated | |
| San Francisco Film Critics Circle Awards | December 13, 2010 | Best Animated Feature | Toy Story 3 | Won | |
| Satellite Awards | December 19, 2010 | Best Animated or Mixed Media Feature | Toy Story 3 | Won | |
| Satellite Awards | December 19, 2010 | Best Original Screenplay | Toy Story 3 | Nominated | |
| Saturn Awards | June 23, 2011 | Best Animated Film | Toy Story 3 | Won | |
| Saturn Awards | June 23, 2011 | Best Writing | Michael Arndt | Nominated | |
| Scream Awards | October 16, 2010 | Best Fantasy Movie | Toy Story 3 | Nominated | |
| Scream Awards | October 16, 2010 | Best Scream-Play | Michael Arndt | Nominated | |
| Scream Awards | October 16, 2010 | Best Fantasy Actor | Tom Hanks | Nominated | |
| Scream Awards | October 16, 2010 | 3-D Top Three | Toy Story 3 | Nominated | |
| St. Louis Film Critics Association Awards | December 20, 2010 | Best Animated Feature | Toy Story 3 | Won | |
| Teen Choice Awards | August 8, 2010 | Choice Animated Movie | Toy Story 3 | Won | |
| Toronto Film Critics Association Awards | December 14, 2010 | Best Animated Film | Toy Story 3 | Runner-up (Note: Shared with Despicable Me (2010)) | |
| Visual Effects Society Awards | February 1, 2011 | Outstanding Visual Effects in an Animated Feature | Lee Unkrich, Darla K. Anderson, Guido Quaroni, and Michael Fong | Nominated | |
| Visual Effects Society Awards | February 1, 2011 | Outstanding Effects Animation in an Animated Feature Motion Picture | Jason Johnston, Eric Froemling, David Ryu, and JD Northrup | Nominated | |
| Washington D.C. Area Film Critics Association Awards | December 6, 2010 | Best Adapted Screenplay | Michael Arndt | Nominated | |
| Washington D.C. Area Film Critics Association Awards | December 6, 2010 | Best Film | Toy Story 3 | Nominated | |
| Washington D.C. Area Film Critics Association Awards | December 6, 2010 | Best Animated Feature | Toy Story 3 | Won | |
| Women Film Critics Circle Awards | December 23, 2010 | Best Family Film | Toy Story 3 | Won | |
| World Soundtrack Awards | October 22, 2011 | Best Original Song Written Directly for a Film | Randy Newman for "We Belong Together" | Won | |

=== Cars 2 ===
Cars 2 is an animated film produced by Pixar and distributed by Walt Disney Pictures. The films produced by Denise Ream and directed by John Lasseter and Brad Lewis. The film stars Owen Wilson, Larry the Cable Guy, Michael Caine, Emily Mortimer, Eddie Izzard, John Turturro, and Jason Isaacs.

The film released on June 24, 2011. Despite being the first and so far the only Pixar film to receive mixed reviews from critics, it was a commercial success, earning a total of $562 million.

Cars 2 was the first Pixar film not to be nominated for any Academy Awards.

It was nominated for the 2012 Kids' Choice Awards.

Accolades received by Cars 2
| Award | Date of ceremony | Category | Recipient(s) | Result | Ref. |
|---|---|---|---|---|---|
| Alliance of Women Film Journalists Awards | January 10, 2012 | Sequel or Remake That Shouldn't Have Been Made | Cars 2 | Nominated | |
| Annie Awards | February 4, 2012 | Best Animated Feature | Cars 2 | Nominated | |
| Annie Awards | February 4, 2012 | Outstanding Achievement for Animated Effects in an Animated Production | Eric Froemling | Nominated | |
| Annie Awards | February 4, 2012 | Outstanding Achievement for Animated Effects in an Animated Production | Jon Reisch | Nominated | |
| Annie Awards | February 4, 2012 | Outstanding Achievement for Character Design in a Feature Production | Jay Shuster | Nominated | |
| Annie Awards | February 4, 2012 | Outstanding Achievement for Editorial in a Feature Production | Stephen Schaffer | Nominated | |
| Annie Awards | February 4, 2012 | Outstanding Achievement for Storyboarding in a Feature Production | Scott Morse | Nominated | |
| Annie Awards | February 4, 2012 | Outstanding Achievement for Production Design in an Animated Feature Production | Harley Jessup | Nominated | |
| Artios Awards | October 29, 2012 | Animation | Kevin Reher and Natalie Lyon | Nominated | |
| British Academy Children's Awards | November 27, 2011 | Kid's Vote — Film | Cars 2 | Nominated | |
| Golden Globe Awards | January 15, 2012 | Best Animated Feature Film | Cars 2 | Nominated | |
| Golden Reel Awards | February 19, 2012 | Outstanding Achievement in Sound Editing – Sound Effects, Foley, Dialogue and ADR for Animated Feature Film | Cars 2 | Nominated | |
| Golden Trailer Awards | June 29, 2011 | Best Animation/Family | "Spies Are Us" (MOCEAN) | Nominated | |
| Hollywood Post Alliance Awards | November 10, 2011 | Outstanding Editing – Feature Film | Stephen Schaffer | Nominated | |
| Hollywood Post Alliance Awards | November 10, 2011 | Outstanding Sound – Feature Film | Tom Myers, Michael Silvers, and Michael Semanick | Nominated | |
| Nickelodeon Kids' Choice Awards | March 31, 2012 | Favorite Animated Movie | Cars 2 | Nominated | |
| People's Choice Awards | January 11, 2012 | Favorite Movie Animated Voice | Owen Wilson | Nominated | |
| Producers Guild of America Awards | January 21, 2012 | Best Animated Motion Picture | Denise Ream | Nominated | |
| Saturn Awards | July 26, 2012 | Best Animated Film | Cars 2 | Nominated | |
| Visual Effects Society Awards | February 7, 2012 | Outstanding Virtual Cinematography in an Animated Feature Motion Picture | Mahyar Abousaeedi, Jeremy Lasky, and Jonathan Pytko | Nominated | |

=== Brave ===
Brave is an animated film produced by Pixar and distributed by Walt Disney Pictures. The films produced by Katherine Sarafian and directed by Mark Andrews, Brenda Chapman and Steve Purcell. The film stars Kelly Macdonald, Julie Walters, Billy Connolly, Emma Thompson, Kevin McKidd, Craig Ferguson, and Robbie Coltrane.

The film released on June 22, 2012. The film received positive reviews from critics, and was a box office success, earning a total of $540 million.

It was nominated for the 2013 Kids' Choice Awards.

Awards
| Award | Category | Recipients | Result |
|---|---|---|---|
| Academy Awards | Best Animated Feature | Mark Andrews and Brenda Chapman | Won |
| Alliance of Women Film Journalists | | | Won |
| Alliance of Women Film Journalists | Best Animated Female | Kelly Macdonald (Merida) | Won |
| American Cinema Editors | Best Edited Animated Feature Film | Nicholas C. Smith, A.C.E. | Won |
| Annie Awards | Best Animated Feature | | Nominated |
| Annie Awards | Animated Effects Feature Production | Bill Watral, Chris Chapman, Dave Hale, Keith Klohn, Michael K. O'Brien | Nominated |
| Annie Awards | Character Animation Feature Production | Dan Nguyen | Nominated |
| Annie Awards | Character Animation Feature Production | Jaime Landes | Nominated |
| Annie Awards | Character Animation Feature Production | Travis Hathaway | Nominated |
| Annie Awards | Music in an Animated Feature Production | Patrick Doyle, Mark Andrews, Alex Mandel | Nominated |
| Annie Awards | Production Design in an Animated Feature Production | Steve Pilcher | Won |
| Annie Awards | Voice Acting in an Animated Feature Production | Kelly Macdonald as Merida | Nominated |
| Annie Awards | Writing in an Animated Feature Production | Brenda Chapman, Irene Mecchi, Mark Andrews and Steve Purcell | Nominated |
| Annie Awards | Editorial in an Animated Feature Production | Nicholas C. Smith, ACE, Robert Graham Jones, ACE, David Suther | Won |
| BAFTA Awards | Best Animated Film | | Won |
| Chicago Film Critics Association | Best Animated Feature | | Nominated |
| Cinema Audio Society | Outstanding Achievement in Sound Mixing for Motion Pictures Animated | | Won |
| Critics' Choice Awards | Best Animated Feature | | Nominated |
| Critics' Choice Awards | Best Song | Mumford & Sons and Birdy (for "Learn Me Right") | Nominated |
| Golden Globe Awards | Best Animated Feature Film | Mark Andrews and Brenda Chapman | Won |
| Grammy Awards | Best Song Written for Visual Media | Mumford & Sons and Birdy (for "Learn Me Right") | Nominated |
| Houston Film Critics Society | Best Animated Film | | Nominated |
| Houston Film Critics Society | Best Original Song | "Learn Me Right" | Nominated |
| Houston Film Critics Society | Best Original Song | "Touch the Sky" | Nominated |
| International Film Music Critics Association Awards | Best Original Score for an Animated Feature | Patrick Doyle | Nominated |
| Kids' Choice Awards | Favorite Animated Movie | | Nominated |
| Online Film Critics Society | Best Animated Feature | | Nominated |
| Phoenix Film Critics Society | Best Animated Film | | Nominated |
| Producers Guild of America | Animated Theatrical Motion Picture | Katherine Sarafian | Nominated |
| San Diego Film Critics Society | Best Animated Film | | Nominated |
| Satellite Awards | Motion Picture, Animated or Mixed Media | | Nominated |
| Satellite Awards | Original Song | "Learn Me Right" – Mumford & Sons and Birdy | Nominated |
| Saturn Awards | Best Animated Film | Mark Andrews and Brenda Chapman | Nominated |
| St. Louis Gateway Film Critics Association | Best Animated Film | | Nominated |
| Toronto Film Critics Association | Best Animated Feature | | Nominated |
| Visual Effects Society | Outstanding Animation in an Animated Feature Motion Picture | Mark Andrews, Brenda Chapman, Steve May, Katherine Sarafian, Bill Wise | Won |
| Visual Effects Society | Outstanding Animated Character in an Animated Feature Motion Picture – Merida | Kelly Macdonald, Travis Hathaway, Olivier Soares, Peter Sumanaseni, Brian Tindall | Won |
| Visual Effects Society | Outstanding Created Environment in an Animated Feature Motion Picture – The Forest | Tim Best, Steve Pilcher, Inigo Quilez, Andy Whittock | Won |
| Visual Effects Society | Outstanding FX and Simulation Animation in an Animated Feature Motion Picture | Chris Chapman, Dave Hale, Michael K. O'Brien, Bill Watral | Won |
| Washington D.C. Area Film Critics Association | Best Animated Feature | | Nominated |
| Women Film Critics Circle | Best Animated Feature | | Won |

=== Monsters University ===
Monsters University is an animated film produced by Pixar Animation Studios and released by Walt Disney Pictures. It was directed by Dan Scanlon and produced by Kori Rae. It is the fourteenth film produced by Pixar and is a prequel to 2001's Monsters, Inc., marking the first time Pixar has made a prequel film.

Billy Crystal, John Goodman, Steve Buscemi, Bob Peterson, and John Ratzenberger reprise their roles as Mike Wazowski, James P. Sullivan, Randall Boggs, Roz, and the Abominable Snowman, respectively. Bonnie Hunt, who played Ms. Flint in the first film, voices Mike's grade school teacher, Ms. Karen Graves. Monsters University premiered on June 5, 2013, at the BFI Southbank in London, United Kingdom and was released on June 21, 2013, in the United States.

The film received positive reviews and was a box office success, grossing $744 million against its estimated budget of $200 million.

It is the second Pixar film not to have been nominated for any Academy Awards, after Cars 2. Monsters University was nominated for the 2014 Kids' Choice Awards. Monsters University marks the first Pixar film not to be nominated for either an Academy Award or a Golden Globe Award.

Awards
| Award | Date of ceremony | Category | Recipients | Result |
|---|---|---|---|---|
| American Cinema Editors | February 7, 2014 | Best Edited Animated Feature Film | Greg Snyder | Nominated |
| Annie Awards | February 1, 2014 | Best Animated Feature | | Nominated |
| Annie Awards | February 1, 2014 | Animated Effects in an Animated Production | | Nominated |
| Annie Awards | February 1, 2014 | Character Animation in an Animated Feature Production | John Chun Chiu Lee | Nominated |
| Annie Awards | February 1, 2014 | Character Design in an Animated Feature Production | Chris Sasaki | Nominated |
| Annie Awards | February 1, 2014 | Music in an Animated Feature Production | Randy Newman | Nominated |
| Annie Awards | February 1, 2014 | Production Design in an Animated Feature Production | Ricky Nierva, Robert Kondo, Daisuke "Dice" Tsutsumi | Nominated |
| Annie Awards | February 1, 2014 | Voice Acting in an Animated Feature Production | Billy Crystal (Mike Wazowski) | Nominated |
| Annie Awards | February 1, 2014 | Writing in an Animated Feature Production | Daniel Gerson, Robert L. Baird, Dan Scanlon | Nominated |
| Annie Awards | February 1, 2014 | Storyboarding in an Animated Feature Production | Dean Kelly | Won |
| Annie Awards | February 1, 2014 | Editorial in an Animated Feature Production | Greg Snyder, Gregory Amundson, Steve Bloom | Won |
| British Academy Film Awards | February 16, 2014 | Best Animated Film | Dan Scanlon | Nominated |
| Cinema Audio Society Awards | February 22, 2014 | Outstanding Achievement in Sound Mixing for Motion Pictures – Animated | Doc Kane, Michael Semanick, Gary Summers, David Boucher, Corey Tyler | Nominated |
| Critics' Choice Movie Award | January 16, 2014 | Best Animated Feature | | Nominated |
| Denver Film Critics Society | January 13, 2014 | Best Animated Feature Film | | Nominated |
| Hollywood Film Awards | October 21, 2013 | Hollywood Animation Award | | Won |
| International Cinephile Society | February 23, 2014 | Best Animated Film | | Nominated |
| Kids' Choice Awards | March 29, 2014 | Favorite Animated Movie | | Nominated |
| Kids' Choice Awards | March 29, 2014 | Favorite Voice from an Animated Movie | Billy Crystal | Nominated |
| Producers Guild of America Award | January 19, 2014 | Outstanding Producer of Animated Theatrical Motion Pictures | Kori Rae | Nominated |
| San Francisco Film Critics Circle | December 15, 2013 | Best Animated Feature | | Nominated |
| Satellite Awards | February 23, 2014 | Best Motion Picture, Animated or Mixed Media | | Nominated |
| Saturn Award | June 2014 | Best Animated Film | | Nominated |
| Visual Effects Society Awards | February 12, 2014 | Outstanding Animation in an Animated Feature Motion Picture | Kori Rae, Sanjay Bakshi, Jon Reisch, Scott Clark | Nominated |
| Visual Effects Society Awards | February 12, 2014 | Outstanding Created Environment in an Animated Feature Motion Picture | Robert Kondo, Eric Andraos, Dale Ruffolo, Peter Sumanaseni (Campus) | Nominated |
| Washington D.C. Area Film Critics Association | December 9, 2013 | Best Animated Feature | | Nominated |

=== Inside Out ===
Inside Out is an animated comedy-drama adventure film, co-written and directed by Pete Docter. The film was released at 2015 Cannes Film Festival on May 18, 2015, and on June 19, 2015, in United States by Walt Disney Studios Motion Pictures. Inside Out opened across 3,946 theaters in the United States and Canada, of which 3,100 showed the film in 3D, and grossed $90.4 million on its opening weekend, ranking #2 at the box office, behind Jurassic World. The film has accumulated over $857 million in worldwide box office revenue.

Inside Out was critically acclaimed, with an approval rating of 98% on the review aggregator Rotten Tomatoes, as well as being included in many critics' Top Ten Films of 2015 lists. The film won the Academy Award for Best Animated Feature and was nominated for Best Original Screenplay at the 88th Academy Awards. It received ten Annie Award wins at 43rd Annie Awards, including Outstanding Achievement in Directing in an Animated Feature Production for Pete Docter, Outstanding Achievement in Voice Acting in an Animated Feature Production for Phyllis Smith and Best Animated Feature. The American Film Institute selected Inside Out as one of the Top Ten Films of the year. The film received a Golden Globe Award for Best Animated Feature Film at the 73rd Golden Globe Awards. It received three Critics' Choice Movie Award nominations including Best Animated Feature.

Accolades received by Inside Out (2015 film)
| Award | Date of ceremony | Category | Recipient(s) | Result | Ref. |
|---|---|---|---|---|---|
| 3D Creative Arts Awards | February 10, 2016 | Best Feature Film – Animation | Inside Out | Won | |
| 3D Creative Arts Awards | February 10, 2016 | Best Stereoscopic Feature Film – Animation | Inside Out | Won | |
| AARP Movies for Grownups Awards | February 8, 2016 | Best Movie for Grownups Who Refuse to Grow Up | Inside Out | Won | |
| Academy Awards | February 28, 2016 | Best Animated Feature | Pete Docter and Jonas Rivera | Won | |
| Academy Awards | February 28, 2016 | Best Original Screenplay | Pete Docter, Meg LeFauve, Josh Cooley, and Ronnie del Carmen | Nominated | |
| Alliance of Women Film Journalists Awards | January 12, 2016 | Best Original Screenplay | Ronnie del Carmen, Josh Cooley, Pete Docter, and Meg LeFauve | Nominated | |
| Alliance of Women Film Journalists Awards | January 12, 2016 | Best Animated Film | Inside Out | Won | |
| American Cinema Editors Awards | January 29, 2016 | Best Edited Animated Feature Film | Kevin Nolting | Won | |
| American Film Institute Awards | December 16, 2015 | Top 10 Films of the Year | Inside Out | Won | |
| Annie Awards | February 6, 2016 | Best Animated Feature | Inside Out | Won | |
| Annie Awards | February 6, 2016 | Outstanding Achievement for Animated Effects in an Animated Production | Amit Baadkar, Dave Hale, Paul Mendoza, and Vincent Serritella | Nominated | |
| Annie Awards | February 6, 2016 | Outstanding Achievement for Character Animation in a Feature Production | Allison Rutland | Won | |
| Annie Awards | February 6, 2016 | Outstanding Achievement for Character Animation in a Feature Production | Travis Hathaway | Nominated | |
| Annie Awards | February 6, 2016 | Outstanding Achievement for Character Design in a Feature Production | Albert Lozano and Chris Sasaki | Won | |
| Annie Awards | February 6, 2016 | Outstanding Achievement for Directing in a Feature Production | Pete Docter | Won | |
| Annie Awards | February 6, 2016 | Outstanding Achievement for Editorial in a Feature Production | Kevin Nolting | Won | |
| Annie Awards | February 6, 2016 | Outstanding Achievement for Music in a Feature Production | Michael Giacchino | Won | |
| Annie Awards | February 6, 2016 | Outstanding Achievement for Production Design in an Animated Feature Production | Ralph Eggleston | Won | |
| Annie Awards | February 6, 2016 | Outstanding Achievement for Storyboarding in a Feature Production | Tony Rosenast | Won | |
| Annie Awards | February 6, 2016 | Outstanding Achievement for Storyboarding in a Feature Production | Domee Shi | Nominated | |
| Annie Awards | February 6, 2016 | Outstanding Achievement for Writing in a Feature Production | Josh Cooley, Pete Docter, and Meg LeFauve | Won | |
| Annie Awards | February 6, 2016 | Outstanding Achievement for Voice Acting in a Feature Production | Amy Poehler | Nominated | |
| Annie Awards | February 6, 2016 | Outstanding Achievement for Voice Acting in a Feature Production | Phyllis Smith | Won | |
| Artios Awards | January 21, 2016 | Animation | Natalie Lyon and Kevin Rehe | Won | |
| Austin Film Critics Association Awards | December 29, 2015 | Top Ten Films | Inside Out | 6th place (Note: Tied with Ex Machina (2014)) | |
| Austin Film Critics Association Awards | December 29, 2015 | Best Original Screenplay | Josh Cooley, Pete Docter, and Meg LeFauve | Won | |
| Austin Film Critics Association Awards | December 29, 2015 | Best Score | Michael Giacchino | Nominated | |
| Austin Film Critics Association Awards | December 29, 2015 | Best Animated Film | Inside Out | Won | |
| Bodil Awards | March 5, 2016 | Best American Film | Inside Out | Nominated | |
| Boston Society of Film Critics Awards | December 7, 2015 | Best Animated Film | Inside Out | Won (Note: Tied with Anomalisa (2015)) | |
| British Academy Children's Awards | November 22, 2015 | Kid's Vote — Film | Inside Out | Nominated | |
| British Academy Children's Awards | November 22, 2015 | Feature Film | Ronnie del Carmen, Pete Docter, and Jonas Rivera | Nominated | |
| British Academy Film Awards | February 14, 2016 | Best Original Screenplay | Josh Cooley, Pete Docter, and Meg LeFauve | Nominated | |
| British Academy Film Awards | February 14, 2016 | Best Animated Film | Pete Docter | Won | |
| Capri Hollywood International Film Festival | January 2, 2016 | Best Animated Film | Inside Out | Won | |
| Chicago Film Critics Association Awards | December 16, 2015 | Best Film | Inside Out | Nominated | |
| Chicago Film Critics Association Awards | December 16, 2015 | Best Original Screenplay | Josh Cooley, Pete Docter, and Meg LeFauve | Nominated | |
| Chicago Film Critics Association Awards | December 16, 2015 | Best Original Score | Michael Giacchino | Nominated | |
| Chicago Film Critics Association Awards | December 16, 2015 | Best Animated Film | Inside Out | Won | |
| Cinema Audio Society Awards | February 20, 2016 | Outstanding Achievement in Sound Mixing in a Motion Picture – Animated | Joel Iwataki, Tom Johnson, Mary Jo Lang, Doc Kane, and Michael Semanick | Won | |
| Critics' Choice Movie Awards | January 17, 2016 | Best Original Screenplay | Josh Cooley, Pete Docter, and Meg LeFauve | Nominated | |
| Critics' Choice Movie Awards | January 17, 2016 | Best Animated Feature | Inside Out | Won | |
| Critics' Choice Movie Awards | January 17, 2016 | Best Comedy | Inside Out | Nominated | |
| Dallas–Fort Worth Film Critics Association Awards | December 14, 2015 | Best Animated Film | Inside Out | Won | |
| David di Donatello Awards | April 18, 2016 | Best Foreign Film | Inside Out | Nominated | |
| Detroit Film Critics Society Awards | December 14, 2015 | Best Film | Inside Out | Nominated | |
| Detroit Film Critics Society Awards | December 14, 2015 | Best Ensemble | Inside Out | Nominated | |
| Detroit Film Critics Society Awards | December 14, 2015 | Best Screenplay | Josh Cooley, Pete Docter, and Meg LeFauve | Nominated | |
| Dublin Film Critics' Circle Awards | December 22, 2015 | Best Film | Inside Out | Won | |
| Empire Awards | March 20, 2016 | Best Animated Film | Inside Out | Won | |
| Empire Awards | March 20, 2016 | Best Comedy | Inside Out | Nominated | |
| Florida Film Critics Circle Awards | December 23, 2015 | Best Original Screenplay | Josh Cooley, Pete Docter, and Meg LeFauve | Nominated | |
| Florida Film Critics Circle Awards | December 23, 2015 | Best Animated Film | Inside Out | Won | |
| Georgia Film Critics Association Awards | January 8, 2016 | Best Picture | Inside Out | Nominated | |
| Georgia Film Critics Association Awards | January 8, 2016 | Best Animated Film | Inside Out | Won | |
| Georgia Film Critics Association Awards | January 8, 2016 | Best Original Screenplay | Pete Docter, Meg LeFauve, and Josh Cooley | Won | |
| Golden Globe Awards | January 10, 2016 | Best Animated Feature Film | Inside Out | Won | |
| Golden Reel Awards | February 27, 2016 | Outstanding Achievement in Sound Editing – Sound Effects, Foley, Dialogue and ADR for Animated Feature Film | Ren Klyce and Shannon Mills | Won | |
| Golden Trailer Awards | May 6, 2015 | Best Animation/Family | "Journey – RUS" (Trailer Park, Inc.) | Nominated | |
| Golden Trailer Awards | May 6, 2015 | Best Animation/Family Poster | "First Day" (Trailer Park, Inc.) | Nominated | |
| Golden Trailer Awards | May 4, 2016 | Best Animation/Family | "SW Trailer3 Reaction Video" (Trailer Park, Inc.) | Nominated | |
| Golden Trailer Awards | May 4, 2016 | Best Animation/Family TV Spot | "Dad Mom" (Trailer Park, Inc.) | Nominated | |
| Golden Trailer Awards | May 4, 2016 | Best Radio Spots | "Worlds Radio" (Trailer Park, Inc.) | Nominated | |
| Golden Trailer Awards | May 4, 2016 | Best Radio Spots | "AA Radio" (Trailer Park, Inc.) | Nominated | |
| Golden Trailer Awards | May 4, 2016 | Most Innovative Advertising for a Feature Film | "SW Trailer3 Reaction Video" (Trailer Park, Inc.) | Nominated | |
| Hollywood Film Awards | November 1, 2015 | Animation of the Year | Pete Docter | Won | |
| Hollywood Music in Media Awards | November 11, 2015 | Best Original Score in an Animated Film | Michael Giacchino | Nominated | |
| Houston Film Critics Society Awards | January 9, 2016 | Best Picture | Inside Out | Nominated | |
| Houston Film Critics Society Awards | January 9, 2016 | Best Animated Feature | Inside Out | Won | |
| Houston Film Critics Society Awards | January 9, 2016 | Best Original Score | Michael Giacchino | Nominated | |
| International Cinephile Society Awards | February 21, 2016 | Best Picture | Inside Out | Nominated | |
| International Cinephile Society Awards | February 21, 2016 | Best Original Screenplay | Pete Docter, Meg LeFauve, Josh Cooley, and Ronnie del Carmen | Nominated | |
| International Cinephile Society Awards | February 21, 2016 | Best Animated Film | Inside Out | Won | |
| International Film Music Critics Association Awards | February 18, 2016 | Best Original Score for an Animated Film | Michael Giacchino | Won | |
| London Film Critics' Circle Awards | January 17, 2016 | Film of the Year | Inside Out | Nominated | |
| Kansas City Film Critics Circle Awards | December 20, 2015 | Best Animated Feature | Inside Out | Won | |
| Los Angeles Film Critics Association Awards | December 6, 2015 | Best Animated Film | Inside Out | Runner-up | |
| Movieguide Awards | February 5, 2016 | Best Movies for Families | Inside Out | Nominated | |
| MTV Movie Awards | April 10, 2016 | Best Virtual Performance | Amy Poehler | Won | |
| NAACP Image Awards | February 5, 2016 | Outstanding Writing in a Motion Picture (Film) | Josh Cooley, Pete Docter, and Meg LeFauve | Nominated | |
| National Board of Review Awards | December 1, 2015 | Top Ten Films | Inside Out | Won | |
| National Board of Review Awards | December 1, 2015 | Best Animated Film | Inside Out | Won | |
| Nebula Awards | May 14, 2016 | Ray Bradbury Nebula Award for Outstanding Dramatic Presentation | Pete Docter, Meg LeFauve, Josh Cooley, and Ronnie del Carmen | Nominated | |
| New York Film Critics Circle Awards | December 2, 2015 | Best Animated Film | Inside Out | Won | |
| New York Film Critics Online Awards | December 6, 2015 | Best Animated Feature | Inside Out | Won | |
| Nickelodeon Kids' Choice Awards | March 12, 2016 | Favorite Animated Movie | Inside Out | Nominated | |
| Nickelodeon Kids' Choice Awards | March 12, 2016 | Favorite Voice from an Animated Movie | Amy Poehler | Won | |
| Online Film Critics Society Awards | December 14, 2015 | Best Picture | Inside Out | Nominated | |
| Online Film Critics Society Awards | December 14, 2015 | Best Animated Film | Inside Out | Won | |
| Online Film Critics Society Awards | December 14, 2015 | Best Original Screenplay | Ronnie del Carmen, Josh Cooley, Pete Docter, and Meg LeFauve | Nominated | |
| People's Choice Awards | January 6, 2016 | Favorite Movie | Inside Out | Nominated | |
| People's Choice Awards | January 6, 2016 | Favorite Animated Movie Voice | Amy Poehler | Nominated | |
| People's Choice Awards | January 6, 2016 | Favorite Family Movie | Inside Out | Nominated | |
| Producers Guild of America Awards | January 23, 2016 | Best Animated Motion Picture | Jonas Rivera | Won | |
| Robert Awards | February 7, 2016 | Best American Film | Inside Out | Nominated | |
| San Diego Film Critics Society Awards | December 14, 2015 | Best Animated Film | Inside Out | Nominated | |
| San Diego Film Critics Society Awards | December 14, 2015 | Best Performance by an Ensemble | Inside Out | Nominated | |
| San Francisco Film Critics Circle Awards | December 13, 2015 | Best Animated Feature | Inside Out | Nominated | |
| Satellite Awards | February 21, 2016 | Best Animated or Mixed Media Feature | Inside Out | Won | |
| Satellite Awards | February 21, 2016 | Best Original Screenplay | Josh Cooley, Pete Docter, and Meg LeFauve | Nominated | |
| Satellite Awards | February 21, 2016 | Best Original Score | Michael Giacchino | Nominated | |
| Satellite Awards | February 21, 2016 | Best Sound | Inside Out | Nominated | |
| Saturn Awards | June 22, 2016 | Best Animated Film | Inside Out | Won | |
| Seattle International Film Festival Awards | June 7, 2015 | Golden Space Needle Award – Best Film | Pete Docter | First runner-up | |
| St. Louis Film Critics Association Awards | December 20, 2015 | Best Film | Inside Out | Runner-up | |
| St. Louis Film Critics Association Awards | December 20, 2015 | Best Original Screenplay | Josh Cooley, Pete Docter, and Meg LeFauve | Nominated | |
| St. Louis Film Critics Association Awards | December 20, 2015 | Best Score | Michael Giacchino | Runner-up | |
| St. Louis Film Critics Association Awards | December 20, 2015 | Best Animated Feature | Inside Out | Won | |
| St. Louis Film Critics Association Awards | December 20, 2015 | Best Comedy Film | Inside Out | Nominated | |
| Teen Choice Awards | August 16, 2015 | Choice Summer Movie | Inside Out | Nominated | |
| Teen Choice Awards | August 16, 2015 | Choice Summer Movie Star: Female | Amy Poehler | Nominated | |
| Teen Choice Awards | August 16, 2015 | Choice Movie: Hissy Fit | Lewis Black | Nominated | |
| Toronto Film Critics Association Awards | December 14, 2015 | Best Animated Film | Inside Out | Nominated | |
| Village Voice Film Poll | December 15, 2015 | Best Picture | Inside Out | 8th place | |
| Village Voice Film Poll | December 15, 2015 | Best Animated Feature | Inside Out | Won | |
| Visual Effects Society Awards | February 2, 2016 | Outstanding Visual Effects in an Animated Feature | Michael Fong, Paul Mendoza, Victor Navone, and Jonas Rivera | Nominated | |
| Visual Effects Society Awards | February 2, 2016 | Outstanding Animated Performance in an Animated Feature | Alexis Angelidis, Tanja Krampfert, Shawn Krause, and Jacob Merrell | Won | |
| Visual Effects Society Awards | February 2, 2016 | Outstanding Created Environment in an Animated Feature | Amy L. Allen, Eric Andraos, Steve Karski, and Jose L. Ramos Serrano for "Imagination Land" | Nominated | |
| Visual Effects Society Awards | February 2, 2016 | Outstanding Effects Simulations in an Animated Feature | Amit Baadkar, Dave Hale, Vincent Serritella, and Paul Mendoza | Nominated | |
| Washington D.C. Area Film Critics Association Awards | December 7, 2015 | Best Original Screenplay | Josh Cooley, Ronnie del Carmen, Pete Docter, and Meg LeFauve | Won | |
| Washington D.C. Area Film Critics Association Awards | December 7, 2015 | Best Animated Feature | Inside Out | Won | |
| Women Film Critics Circle Awards | December 18, 2015 | Best Family Film | Inside Out | Won | |
| Women Film Critics Circle Awards | December 18, 2015 | Best Animated Female | Amy Poehler | Won | |
| World Soundtrack Awards | October 24, 2015 | Film Composer of the Year | Michael Giacchino (Note: Also for Dawn of the Planet of the Apes (2014), Jupiter Ascending (2015), Jurassic World (2015), and Tomorrowland (2015)) | Won | |
| Young Artist Awards | March 13, 2016 | Best Performance in a Voice-over Role – Young Actress (12–21) | Kaitlyn Dias | Won | |

=== The Good Dinosaur ===
The Good Dinosaur is an animated comedy-drama adventure film produced by Pixar Animation Studios and released by Walt Disney Pictures. The film was directed by Peter Sohn from a screenplay by Meg LeFauve. Set in a world in which dinosaurs never became extinct, the film follows a young Apatosaurus named Arlo, who meets an unlikely human friend while traveling through a harsh and mysterious landscape. The film stars Raymond Ochoa, Jack Bright, Sam Elliott, Anna Paquin, A. J. Buckley, Jeffrey Wright, Frances McDormand and Steve Zahn. The Good Dinosaur had its premiere on November 10, 2015, in Paris, and was released in the United States on November 25, 2015.

The film, along with Inside Out, marks the first time that Pixar has released two feature films in the same year. The Good Dinosaur received positive reviews from critics, but underperformed at the box office, grossing $332 million against a budget of $175–200 million.

It is the third Pixar film not to have been nominated for any Academy Awards, after Cars 2 and Monsters University.

Accolades received by The Good Dinosaur
| Award | Date of ceremony | Category | Recipient(s) | Result | Ref. |
|---|---|---|---|---|---|
| American Cinema Editors Awards | January 29, 2016 | Best Edited Animated Feature Film | Stephen Schaffer | Nominated | |
| Annie Awards | February 6, 2016 | Best Animated Feature | The Good Dinosaur | Nominated | |
| Annie Awards | February 6, 2016 | Outstanding Achievement for Animated Effects in an Animated Production | Jon Reisch and Stephen Marshall | Won | |
| Annie Awards | February 6, 2016 | Outstanding Achievement for Character Animation in a Feature Production | Mark C. Harris | Nominated | |
| Annie Awards | February 6, 2016 | Outstanding Achievement for Character Animation in a Feature Production | K.C. Roeyer | Nominated | |
| Annie Awards | February 6, 2016 | Outstanding Achievement for Character Design in a Feature Production | Matt Nolte | Nominated | |
| Annie Awards | February 6, 2016 | Outstanding Achievement for Music in a Feature Production | Mychael Danna and Jeff Danna | Nominated | |
| Annie Awards | February 6, 2016 | Outstanding Achievement for Production Design in an Animated Feature Production | Harley Jessup, Sharon Calahan, Bryn Imagire, Noah Klocek, and Huy Nguyen | Nominated | |
| Annie Awards | February 6, 2016 | Outstanding Achievement for Storyboarding in a Feature Production | Bill Presing | Nominated | |
| Annie Awards | February 6, 2016 | Outstanding Achievement for Storyboarding in a Feature Production | Rosana Sullivan | Nominated | |
| Annie Awards | February 6, 2016 | Outstanding Achievement for Storyboarding in a Feature Production | J.P. Vine, Tony Rosenast, and Enrico Casarosa | Nominated | |
| Artios Awards | January 21, 2016 | Animation | Natalie Lyon and Kevin Reher | Nominated | |
| Black Reel Awards | February 18, 2016 | Best Voice Performance | Jeffrey Wright | Nominated | |
| British Academy Children's Awards | November 20, 2016 | Kid's Vote — Film | The Good Dinosaur | Nominated | |
| British Academy Children's Awards | November 20, 2016 | Feature Film | The Good Dinosaur | Nominated | |
| Chicago Film Critics Association Awards | December 16, 2015 | Best Animated Film | The Good Dinosaur | Nominated | |
| Cinema Audio Society Awards | February 20, 2016 | Outstanding Achievement in Sound Mixing in a Motion Picture – Animated | Vince Caro, Tom Johnson, Michael Semanick, Brad Haehnel, and Kyle Rochlin | Nominated | |
| Critics' Choice Movie Awards | January 17, 2016 | Best Animated Feature | The Good Dinosaur | Nominated | |
| Florida Film Critics Circle Awards | December 23, 2015 | Best Animated Film | The Good Dinosaur | Nominated | |
| Georgia Film Critics Association Awards | January 8, 2016 | Best Animated Film | The Good Dinosaur | Nominated | |
| Golden Globe Awards | January 10, 2016 | Best Animated Feature Film | The Good Dinosaur | Nominated | |
| Golden Reel Awards | February 27, 2016 | Outstanding Achievement in Sound Editing – Sound Effects, Foley, Dialogue and ADR for Animated Feature Film | Shannon Mills | Nominated | |
| Houston Film Critics Society Awards | January 9, 2016 | Best Animated Film | The Good Dinosaur | Nominated | |
| Movieguide Awards | February 5, 2016 | Best Movies for Families | The Good Dinosaur | Nominated | |
| NAACP Image Awards | February 5, 2016 | Outstanding Character Voice Performance – Motion Picture | Jeffrey Wright | Nominated | |
| Online Film Critics Society Awards | December 14, 2015 | Best Animated Film | The Good Dinosaur | Nominated | |
| Producers Guild of America Awards | January 23, 2016 | Best Animated Motion Picture | Denise Ream | Nominated | |
| San Diego Film Critics Society Awards | December 14, 2015 | Best Animated Film | The Good Dinosaur | Nominated | |
| Satellite Awards | February 21, 2016 | Best Motion Picture, Animated or Mixed Media | The Good Dinosaur | Nominated | |
| Saturn Awards | June 22, 2016 | Best Animated Film | The Good Dinosaur | Nominated | |
| Village Voice Film Poll | January 7, 2016 | Best Animated Film | The Good Dinosaur | 10th Place | |
| Visual Effects Society Awards | February 2, 2016 | Outstanding Visual Effects in an Animated Feature | Sanjay Bakshi, Denise Ream, Michael Venturini, and Jon Reisch | Won | |
| Visual Effects Society Awards | February 2, 2016 | Outstanding Animated Performance in an Animated Feature | Ana Gabriela Lacaze, Jacob Brooks, Lou Hamou-Lhadj, and Mark C. Harris for "Spot" | Nominated | |
| Visual Effects Society Awards | February 2, 2016 | Outstanding Created Environment in an Animated Feature | David Munier, Matthew Webb, Matt Kuruc, and Tom Miller for "The Farm" | Won | |
| Visual Effects Society Awards | February 2, 2016 | Outstanding Effects Simulations in an Animated Feature | Stephen Marshall, Magnus Wrenninge, Michael Hall, and Hemagiri Arumugam | Won | |

=== Finding Dory ===
Finding Dory is an animated comedy-drama film produced by Pixar Animation Studios and released by Walt Disney Pictures. Directed and co-written by Andrew Stanton with co-direction by Angus MacLane in his feature debut, the screenplay was co-written by Victoria Strouse and Stanton. The film is a sequel to 2003's Finding Nemo. The film features the returning voices of Ellen DeGeneres and Albert Brooks, with Hayden Rolence (replacing Alexander Gould), Ed O'Neill, Kaitlin Olson, Ty Burrell, Diane Keaton, and Eugene Levy joining the cast.

The film premiered at the El Capitan Theatre in Los Angeles on June 8, 2016, and was released in the United States on June 17, 2016. It received positive reviews and has grossed over $1 billion worldwide.

It is the fourth Pixar film not to have been nominated for any Academy Awards, after Cars 2, Monsters University and The Good Dinosaur.

| Award | Date of ceremony | Category | Recipient(s) | Result | Ref(s). |
|---|---|---|---|---|---|
| 2016 | Alliance of Women Film Journalists | Best Animated Film | Andrew Stanton and Angus MacLane | Nominated | |
| 2016 | Alliance of Women Film Journalists | Best Animated Female | Ellen DeGeneres | Nominated | |
| 2016 | British Academy Children's Awards | BAFTA Kids' Vote | Finding Dory | Nominated | |
| 2016 | Critics' Choice Awards | Best Animated Feature | Finding Dory | Nominated | |
| 2016 | Hollywood Music in Media Awards | Best Original Score – Animated Film | Thomas Newman | Nominated | |
| 2016 | San Francisco Film Critics Circle | Best Animated Feature | Finding Dory | Nominated | |
| 2016 | St. Louis Gateway Film Critics Association | Best Animated Film | Finding Dory | Nominated | |
| 2016 | Teen Choice Awards | Choice Summer Movie | Finding Dory | Won | |
| 2016 | Teen Choice Awards | Choice Summer Movie Star: Female | Ellen DeGeneres | Won | |
| 2016 | Washington D.C. Area Film Critics Association | Best Animated Feature | Finding Dory | Nominated | |
| 2016 | Washington D.C. Area Film Critics Association | Best Voice Performance | Ellen DeGeneres | Nominated | |
| 2016 | Women Film Critics Circle | Best Animated Female | Finding Dory | Nominated | |
| 2017 | Annie Awards | Best Animated Feature | Finding Dory | Nominated | |
| 2017 | Annie Awards | Outstanding Achievement, Character Animation in a Feature Production | Erick Oh | Nominated | |
| 2017 | Annie Awards | Outstanding Achievement, Storyboarding in an Animated Feature Production | Trevor Jimenez | Nominated | |
| 2017 | Black Reel Awards | Outstanding Voice Performance | Idris Elba | Nominated | |
| 2017 | British Academy Film Awards | Best Animated Film | Finding Dory | Nominated | |
| 2017 | Cinema Audio Society | Outstanding Achievement in Sound Mixing for a Motion Picture – Animated | Scott Curtis, Doc Kane, Nathan Nance, Michael Semanick and Thomas Vicari | Won | |
| 2017 | Empire Awards | Best Animated Film | Finding Dory | Won | |
| 2017 | Georgia Film Critics Association | Best Animated Film | Andrew Stanton and Lindsey Collins | Nominated | |
| 2017 | Houston Film Critics Society | Best Animated Feature Film | Finding Dory | Nominated | |
| 2017 | 2017 Kids' Choice Awards | Favorite Animated Movie | Finding Dory | Won | |
| 2017 | 2017 Kids' Choice Awards | Favorite Voice From an Animated Movie | Ellen DeGeneres | Won | |
| 2017 | 2017 Kids' Choice Awards | Most Wanted Pet | Ellen DeGeneres | Nominated | |
| 2017 | 2017 Kids' Choice Awards | #Squad | Ellen DeGeneres, Albert Brooks, Kaitlin Olson, Hayden Rolence, Willem Dafoe, Ed O'Neill, Ty Burrell and Eugene Levy | Won | |
| 2017 | NAACP Image Awards | Outstanding Character Voice-Over Performance | Idris Elba | Nominated | |
| 2017 | Online Film Critics Society | Best Animated Film | Finding Dory | Nominated | |
| 2017 | People's Choice Awards | Favorite Movie | Finding Dory | Won | |
| 2017 | People's Choice Awards | Favorite Family Movie | Finding Dory | Won | |
| 2017 | People's Choice Awards | Favorite Animated Movie Voice | Ellen DeGeneres | Won | |
| 2017 | Producers Guild of America | Best Animated Motion Picture | Lindsey Collins | Nominated | |
| 2017 | Satellite Awards | Best Animated or Mixed Media Feature | Finding Dory | Nominated | |
| 2017 | Saturn Awards | Best Animated Film | Finding Dory | Won | |
| 2017 | Village Voice Film Poll | Best Animated Feature | Finding Dory | 7th place | |
| 2017 | Visual Effects Society | Outstanding Visual Effects in an Animated Feature | Chris J. Chapman, Lindsey Collins, John Halstead and Angus MacLane | Nominated | |
| 2017 | Visual Effects Society | Outstanding Animated Performance in an Animated Feature | Hank – Jonathan Hoffman, Steven Clay Hunter, Mark Piretti and Audrey Wong | Won | |
| 2017 | Visual Effects Society | Outstanding Created Environment in an Animated Feature | Open Ocean Exhibit – Stephen Gustafson, Jack Hattori, Jesse Hollander and Michael Rutter | Nominated | |
| 2017 | Visual Effects Society | Outstanding Effects Simulations in an Animated Feature | Stephen Gustafson, Allen Hemberger, Joshua Jenny and Matthew Kiyoshi Wong | Nominated | |

=== Cars 3 ===
Cars 3 is an animated sports comedy-drama film produced by Pixar and released by Walt Disney Pictures. Directed by Brian Fee in his directorial debut, the screenplay was written by Kiel Murray, Bob Peterson and Mike Rich. The returning voices of Owen Wilson, Bonnie Hunt, and Larry the Cable Guy are joined by Cristela Alonzo, Chris Cooper, Armie Hammer, Nathan Fillion, Kerry Washington, and Lea DeLaria.

It is the fifth Pixar film not to have been nominated for any Academy Awards, after Cars 2, Monsters University, The Good Dinosaur, and Finding Dory.

| Award | Date of ceremony | Category | Recipient(s) | Result | Ref. |
|---|---|---|---|---|---|
| Teen Choice Awards | August 13, 2017 | Choice Movie: Comedy | Walt Disney Pictures | Nominated | |
| Teen Choice Awards | August 13, 2017 | Choice Movie Actor: Comedy | Owen Wilson | Nominated | |
| Detroit Film Critics Society | December 7, 2017 | Best Animated Film | Cars 3 | Nominated | |
| St. Louis Film Critics Association | December 15, 2017 | Best Animated Feature | Brian Fee | Nominated | |
| IGN Awards | December 19, 2017 | Best Animated Movie | Cars 3 | Nominated | |
| Image Awards | January 15, 2018 | Outstanding Character Voice-Over Performance | Kerry Washington | Nominated | |
| Satellite Awards | February 10, 2018 | Best Animated or Mixed Media Feature | Cars 3 | Nominated | |
| Art Directors Guild | January 27, 2018 | Production Design in an Animated Feature | William Cone and Jay Shuster | Nominated | |
| Visual Effects Society Awards | February 13, 2018 | Outstanding Visual Effects in an Animated Feature | Brian Fee, Kevin Reher, Michael Fong, and Jon Reisch | Nominated | |
| Visual Effects Society Awards | February 13, 2018 | Outstanding Created Environment in an Animated Feature | Marlena Fecho, Thidartana Annee Jonjai, Jose L. Ramos Serrano, and Frank Tai for "Abandoned Racetrack" | Nominated | |
| Visual Effects Society Awards | February 13, 2018 | Outstanding Effects Simulations in an Animated Feature | Greg Gladstone, Stephen Marshall, Leon JeongWook Park, and Tim Speltz | Nominated | |
| Annie Award | February 3, 2018 | Best Animated Feature | Kevin Reher | Nominated | |
| Annie Award | February 3, 2018 | Animated Effects in an Animated Production | Amit Baadkar, Greg Gladstone, Stephen Marshall, Tim Speltz, and Jon Reisch | Nominated | |
| Cinema Audio Society Awards | February 24, 2018 | Outstanding Achievement in Sound Mixing for a Motion Picture – Animated | Doc Kane, Tom Meyers, Michael Semanick, Nathan Nance, David Boucher, and Blake Collins | Nominated | |
| Nickelodeon Kids' Choice Awards | March 24, 2018 | Favorite Animated Movie | Cars 3 | Nominated | |
| Saturn Awards | June 27, 2018 | Best Animated Film | Cars 3 | Nominated | |

=== Coco ===
Coco is a 2017 American animated fantasy film produced by Pixar Animation Studios and released by Walt Disney Pictures. The film was directed by Lee Unkrich and was based on an original idea by Unkrich with the screenplay written by Adrian Molina (who also co-directed) and Matthew Aldrich.

Accolades received by Coco (2017 film)
| Award | Date of ceremony | Category | Recipients | Result | Ref. |
|---|---|---|---|---|---|
| Academy Awards | March 4, 2018 | Best Animated Feature | Lee Unkrich and Darla K. Anderson | Won | |
| Academy Awards | March 4, 2018 | Best Original Song | Kristen Anderson-Lopez and Robert Lopez (for "Remember Me") | Won | |
| ACE Eddie Awards | January 26, 2018 | Best Edited Animated Feature Film | Steve Bloom | Won | |
| Alliance of Women Film Journalists Awards | January 9, 2018 | Best Animated Film | Coco | Won (Note: Tied with Loving Vincent) | |
| Alliance of Women Film Journalists Awards | January 9, 2018 | Best Animated Female | Mama Imelda | Nominated | |
| Annie Awards | February 3, 2018 | Best Animated Feature | Coco | Won | |
| Annie Awards | February 3, 2018 | Animated Effects in an Animated Production | Shaun Galinak, Dave Hale, Jason Johnston, Carl Kaphan, Keith Daniel Klohn | Won | |
| Annie Awards | February 3, 2018 | Character Animation in an Animated Feature Production | John Chun Chiu Lee | Won | |
| Annie Awards | February 3, 2018 | Character Animation in an Animated Feature Production | Allison Rutland | Nominated | |
| Annie Awards | February 3, 2018 | Character Design in an Animated Feature Production | Daniel Arriaga, Daniela Strijleva, Greg Dykstra, Alonso Martinez, Zaruhi Galstyan | Won | |
| Annie Awards | February 3, 2018 | Directing in an Animated Feature Production | Lee Unkrich and Adrian Molina | Won | |
| Annie Awards | February 3, 2018 | Music in an Animated Feature Production | Michael Giacchino, Kristen Anderson-Lopez, Robert Lopez, Germaine Franco, Adrian Molina | Won | |
| Annie Awards | February 3, 2018 | Production Design in an Animated Feature Production | Harley Jessup, Danielle Feinberg, Bryn Imagire, Nathaniel McLaughlin, Ernesto Nemesio | Won | |
| Annie Awards | February 3, 2018 | Storyboarding in an Animated Feature Production | Dean Kelly | Won | |
| Annie Awards | February 3, 2018 | Storyboarding in an Animated Feature Production | Madeline Sharafian | Nominated | |
| Annie Awards | February 3, 2018 | Voice Acting in an Animated Feature Production | Anthony Gonzalez | Won | |
| Annie Awards | February 3, 2018 | Writing in an Animated Feature Production | Adrian Molina and Matthew Aldrich | Won | |
| Annie Awards | February 3, 2018 | Editorial in an Animated Feature Production | Steve Bloom, Lee Unkrich, Greg Snyder, Tim Fox | Won | |
| African-American Film Critics Association | February 7, 2018 | Best Animated Feature | Coco | Won | |
| African-American Film Critics Association | February 7, 2018 | Top 10 Films | Coco | Won | |
| Art Directors Guild | January 27, 2018 | Production Design in an Animated Feature | Harley Jessup | Won | |
| Austin Film Critics Association | January 8, 2018 | Best Animated Film | Coco | Won | |
| Boston Society of Film Critics | December 10, 2017 | Best Animated Film | Coco | Won | |
| British Academy Film Awards | February 18, 2018 | Best Animated Film | Coco | Won | |
| Cinema Audio Society Awards | February 24, 2018 | Outstanding Achievement in Sound Mixing for a Motion Picture – Animated | Vince Caro, Christopher Boyes, Michael Semanick, Joel Iwataki and Blake Collins | Won | |
| Chicago Film Critics Association | December 12, 2017 | Best Animated Film | Coco | Won | |
| Critics' Choice Movie Awards | January 11, 2018 | Best Animated Feature | Coco | Won | |
| Critics' Choice Movie Awards | January 11, 2018 | Best Song | "Remember Me" | Won | |
| Dallas–Fort Worth Film Critics Association | December 13, 2017 | Best Animated Film | Coco | Won | |
| Detroit Film Critics Society | December 7, 2017 | Best Animated Film | Coco | Nominated | |
| Empire Awards | March 18, 2018 | Best Animated Film | Coco | Won | |
| Florida Film Critics Circle | December 23, 2017 | Best Animated Film | Coco | Won | |
| Georgia Film Critics Association | January 12, 2018 | Best Animated Film | Coco | Won | |
| Georgia Film Critics Association | January 12, 2018 | Best Original Song | "Remember Me" | Won | |
| Golden Globe Awards | January 7, 2018 | Best Animated Feature Film | Coco | Won | |
| Golden Globe Awards | January 7, 2018 | Best Original Song | Kristen Anderson-Lopez and Robert Lopez (for the song "Remember Me") | Nominated | |
| Golden Reel Awards | February 18, 2018 | Outstanding Achievement in Sound Editing – Feature Animation | J.R. Grubbs, Chris Boyes, Marshall Winn, Michael Silvers, Michael Silvers, Justin Doyle, Jack Whittaker, Terry Eckton, Dee Selby, Jana Vance, Dennie Thorpe, Geoff Vaughan | Won | |
| Golden Reel Awards | February 18, 2018 | Outstanding Achievement in Sound Editing – Musical | Stephen Davis and Warren Brown | Nominated | |
| Grammy Awards | February 10, 2019 | Best Song Written for Visual Media | Kristen Anderson-Lopez and Robert Lopez for "Remember Me" | Nominated | |
| Grammy Awards | February 10, 2019 | Best Score Soundtrack for Visual Media | Michael Giacchino | Nominated | |
| Guild of Music Supervisors Awards | February 8, 2018 | Best Music Supervision for Film: Budgeted Over 25 Million Dollars | Tom MacDougall | Nominated | |
| Guild of Music Supervisors Awards | February 8, 2018 | Best Song/Recording Created for a Film | "Remember Me" | Nominated | |
| Heartland Film Festival | November 23, 2017 | Truly Moving Picture Award | Lee Unkrich | Won | |
| Hollywood Film Awards | November 5, 2017 | Hollywood Animation Award | Lee Unkrich and Darla K. Anderson | Won | |
| Hollywood Music in Media Awards | November 16, 2017 | Best Original Score – Animated Film | Michael Giacchino | Won | |
| Houston Film Critics Society | January 6, 2018 | Best Animated Film | Coco | Won | |
| Houston Film Critics Society | January 6, 2018 | Best Original Song | "Remember Me" | Won | |
| Humanitas Prize | February 16, 2018 | Feature – Family | Lee Unkrich, Jason Katz, Matthew Aldrich and Adrian Molina | Nominated | |
| Imagen Awards | August 25, 2018 | Best Picture | Coco | Won | |
| Imagen Awards | August 25, 2018 | Best Director | Lee Unkrich and Adrian Molina | Won | |
| International Film Music Critics Association | February 22, 2018 | Best Original Score for an Animated Film | Michael Giacchino | Nominated | |
| Kansas City Film Critics Circle Awards | {December 17, 2017 | Best Animated Feature | Coco | Won | |
| Kids' Choice Awards | March 24, 2018 | Favorite Animated Movie | Coco | Won | |
| Los Angeles Film Critics Association | December 3, 2017 | Best Animated Film | Coco | Runner-up | |
| National Board of Review | January 9, 2018 | Best Animated Film | Coco | Won | |
| New York Film Critics Circle | January 3, 2018 | Best Animated Film | Coco | Won | |
| New York Film Critics Online | December 10, 2017 | Best Animated Film | Coco | Won | |
| Online Film Critics Society | December 28, 2017 | Best Animated Feature | Coco | Won | |
| Producers Guild of America Awards | January 20, 2018 | Best Animated Motion Picture | Darla K. Anderson | Won | |
| San Diego Film Critics Society | December 11, 2017 | Best Animated Film | Coco | Nominated | |
| San Francisco Film Critics Circle | December 10, 2017 | Best Animated Feature | Coco | Won | |
| Satellite Awards | February 11, 2018 | Best Animated or Mixed Media Feature | Coco | Won | |
| Satellite Awards | February 11, 2018 | Best Sound (Editing and Mixing) | Coco | Nominated | |
| Saturn Awards | June 27, 2018 | Best Animated Film | Coco | Won | |
| Saturn Awards | June 27, 2018 | Best Music | Michael Giacchino | Won | |
| Seattle Film Critics Society | December 18, 2017 | Best Animated Feature | Coco | Won | |
| St. Louis Film Critics Association | December 17, 2017 | Best Animated Feature | Coco | Won | |
| Teen Choice Awards | August 12, 2018 | Choice Fantasy Movie | Coco | Won | |
| Teen Choice Awards | August 12, 2018 | Choice Fantasy Movie Actor | Anthony Gonzalez | Won | |
| Teen Choice Awards | August 12, 2018 | Choice Fantasy Movie Actor | Gael García Bernal | Nominated | |
| Toronto Film Critics Association | December 10, 2017 | Best Animated Film | Coco | Runner-up | |
| Visual Effects Society Awards | February 13, 2018 | Outstanding Visual Effects in an Animated Feature | Lee Unkrich, Darla K. Anderson, David Ryu, Michael K. O'Brien | Won | |
| Visual Effects Society Awards | February 13, 2018 | Outstanding Animated Character in an Animated Feature | Emron Grover, Jonathan Hoffman, Michael Honsel, Guilherme Sauerbronn Jacinto for "Hèctor" | Won | |
| Visual Effects Society Awards | February 13, 2018 | Outstanding Created Environment in an Animated Feature | Michael Frederickson, Jamie Hecker, Jonathan Pytko, Dave Strick for "City of the Dead" | Won | |
| Visual Effects Society Awards | February 13, 2018 | Outstanding Effects Simulations in an Animated Feature | Kristopher Campbell, Stephen Gustafson, Dave Hale, Keith Klohn | Won | |
| Washington D.C. Area Film Critics Association | December 8, 2017 | Best Animated Feature | Coco | Won | |
| Washington D.C. Area Film Critics Association | December 8, 2017 | Best Animated Voice Performance | Anthony Gonzalez | Won | |
| Washington D.C. Area Film Critics Association | December 8, 2017 | Best Animated Voice Performance | Gael García Bernal | Nominated | |
| Washington D.C. Area Film Critics Association | December 8, 2017 | Best Original Score | Michael Giacchino | Nominated | |
| Women Film Critics Circle Awards | December 22, 2017 | Best Family Film | Coco | Won | |
| Women Film Critics Circle Awards | December 22, 2017 | Best Animated Female(s) | Coco | Won | |
| World Soundtrack Awards | October 17, 2018 | Best Original Song Written Directly for a Film | "Remember Me" | Nominated | |

=== Incredibles 2 ===
Incredibles 2 is a 2018 American animated superhero film produced by Pixar Animation Studios and distributed by Walt Disney Pictures. Written and directed by Brad Bird, it is a sequel to The Incredibles (2004) and the second full-length installment of the franchise. The film features the returning voices of Craig T. Nelson, Holly Hunter, Sarah Vowell, Samuel L. Jackson, and Brad Bird with Huckleberry Milner (replacing Spencer Fox), Bob Odenkirk, Catherine Keener, and Jonathan Banks (replacing Bud Luckey) joining the cast.

| Award | Date of ceremony | Category | Recipient(s) | Result | Ref. |
|---|---|---|---|---|---|
| Academy Awards | February 24, 2019 | Best Animated Feature | Brad Bird, John Walker and Nicole Paradis Grindle | Nominated | |
| Alliance of Women Film Journalists | January 10, 2019 | Best Animated Feature Film | Brad Bird | Nominated | |
| Alliance of Women Film Journalists | January 10, 2019 | Best Animated Female | Holly Hunter as Elastigirl | Won | |
| Annie Awards | February 2, 2019 | Annie Award for Best Animated Feature | Brad Bird, John Walker and Nicole Paradis Grindle | Nominated | |
| Annie Awards | February 2, 2019 | Outstanding Achievement for Animated Effects in an Animated Feature Production | Greg Gladstone, Tolga Göktekin, Jason Johnston, Eric Lacroix and Krzysztof Rost | Nominated | |
| Annie Awards | February 2, 2019 | Outstanding Achievement for Character Animation in an Animated Feature Production | Lance Fite | Nominated | |
| Annie Awards | February 2, 2019 | Outstanding Achievement for Character Design in an Animated Feature Production | Matt Notle | Nominated | |
| Annie Awards | February 2, 2019 | Annie Award for Directing in a Feature Production | Brad Bird | Nominated | |
| Annie Awards | February 2, 2019 | Annie Award for Music in a Feature Production | Michael Giacchino | Won | |
| Annie Awards | February 2, 2019 | Outstanding Achievement for Storyboarding in an Animated Feature Production | Dean Kelly | Won | |
| Annie Awards | February 2, 2019 | Outstanding Achievement for Storyboarding in an Animated Feature Production | Bobby Alcid Rubio | Nominated | |
| Annie Awards | February 2, 2019 | Annie Award for Voice Acting in a Feature Production | Holly Hunter | Nominated | |
| Annie Awards | February 2, 2019 | Annie Award for Writing in a Feature Production | Brad Bird | Nominated | |
| Annie Awards | February 2, 2019 | Outstanding Achievement for Editorial in an Animated Feature Production | Stephen Schaffer, Anthony J. Greenberg and Katie Schaefer Bishop | Nominated | |
| British Academy Children's Awards | November 25, 2018 | Feature Film | Brad Bird, John Walker and Nicole Paradis Grindle | Nominated | |
| British Academy Film Awards | February 10, 2019 | Best Animated Film | Brad Bird, John Walker and Nicole Paradis Grindle | Nominated | |
| Chicago Film Critics Association Awards | December 7, 2018 | Best Animated Feature | Brad Bird | Nominated | |
| Critics' Choice Movie Awards | January 13, 2019 | Best Animated Feature | Brad Bird | Nominated | |
| Golden Globe Awards | January 6, 2019 | Best Animated Feature Film | Incredibles 2 | Nominated | |
| Hollywood Music in Media Awards | November 14, 2018 | Original Score – Animated Film | Michael Giacchino | Nominated | |
| Humanitas Prize | February 8, 2019 | Family Feature Film | Brad Bird | Nominated | |
| Kids' Choice Awards | March 23, 2019 | Favorite Animated Movie | Incredibles 2 | Won | |
| Los Angeles Film Critics Association | December 9, 2018 | Best Animated Feature | Incredibles 2 | 2nd place | |
| National Board of Review | November 27, 2018 | Best Animated Film | Brad Bird | Won | |
| New York Film Critics Circle Awards | November 29, 2018 | Best Animated Feature | Incredibles 2 | Nominated | |
| San Diego Film Critics Society | December 10, 2018 | Best Animated Feature | Incredibles 2 | Nominated | |
| San Francisco Film Critics Circle | December 9, 2018 | Best Animated Feature | Incredibles 2 | Nominated | |
| Seattle Film Critics Society | December 17, 2018 | Best Animated Feature | Brad Bird | Nominated | |
| St. Louis Film Critics Association | December 16, 2018 | Best Animated Feature | Incredibles 2 | Nominated | |
| People's Choice Awards | November 11, 2018 | Favorite Family Movie | Incredibles 2 | Won | |
| People's Choice Awards | November 11, 2018 | Movie of 2018 | Incredibles 2 | Nominated | |
| Satellite Awards | February 22, 2019 | Best Animated or Mixed Media Film | Brad Bird | Nominated | |
| Saturn Awards | September 13, 2019 | Best Animated Film | Incredibles 2 | Nominated | |
| Teen Choice Awards | August 12, 2018 | Choice Summer Movie | Incredibles 2 | Won | |
| Visual Effects Society Awards | February 5, 2019 | Outstanding Visual Effects in an Animated Feature | Brad Bird, John Walker, Rick Sayre, Bill Watral | Nominated | |
| Visual Effects Society Awards | February 5, 2019 | Outstanding Animated Character in an Animated Feature | Michal Makarewicz, Ben Porter, Edgar Rodriguez, Kevin Singleton for Helen Parr | Nominated | |
| Visual Effects Society Awards | February 5, 2019 | Outstanding Created Environment in an Animated Feature | Christopher M. Burrows, Philip Metschan, Michael Rutter, Joshua West for The Parr House | Nominated | |
| Visual Effects Society Awards | February 5, 2019 | Outstanding Model in a Photoreal or Animated Project | Neil Blevins, Philip Metschan, Kevin Singleton for Underminer Vehicle | Nominated | |
| Visual Effects Society Awards | February 5, 2019 | Outstanding Effects Simulations in an Animated Feature | Paul Kanyuk, Tiffany Erickson Klohn, Vincent Serritella, Matthew Kiyoshi Wong | Nominated | |
| Washington D.C. Area Film Critics Association Awards | December 3, 2018 | Best Animated Feature | Brad Bird | Nominated | |
| Washington D.C. Area Film Critics Association Awards | December 3, 2018 | Best Animated Voice Performance | Holly Hunter | Nominated | |

=== Toy Story 4 ===
Toy Story 4 is a 2019 American animated comedy film produced by Pixar Animation Studios for Walt Disney Pictures. It is the fourth installment in Pixar's Toy Story series and the sequel to Toy Story 3 (2010). It was directed by Josh Cooley (in his feature directorial debut) from a screenplay by Andrew Stanton and Stephany Folsom; the three also conceived the story alongside John Lasseter, Rashida Jones, Will McCormack, Valerie LaPointe, and Martin Hynes. Tom Hanks, Tim Allen, Annie Potts, Joan Cusack, Wallace Shawn, John Ratzenberger, Estelle Harris, Blake Clark, Bonnie Hunt, Jeff Garlin, and Timothy Dalton reprise their character roles from the first three films. They are joined by Tony Hale, Keegan-Michael Key, Jordan Peele, Christina Hendricks, Keanu Reeves, and Ally Maki.

Accolades received by Toy Story 4
| Award | Date of ceremony | Category | Recipient(s) | Result | Ref. |
|---|---|---|---|---|---|
| Academy Awards | February 9, 2020 | Best Animated Feature | Josh Cooley, Mark Nielsen, and Jonas Rivera | Won | |
| Academy Awards | February 9, 2020 | Best Original Song | Randy Newman for "I Can't Let You Throw Yourself Away" | Nominated | |
| Alliance of Women Film Journalists Awards | January 10, 2020 | Best Animated Feature | Toy Story 4 | Nominated | |
| Alliance of Women Film Journalists Awards | January 10, 2020 | Best Animated Female | Annie Potts | Won | |
| American Cinema Editors Awards | January 17, 2020 | Best Edited Animated Feature Film | Axel Geddes | Won | |
| Annie Awards | January 25, 2020 | Best Animated Feature | Toy Story 4 | Nominated | |
| Annie Awards | January 25, 2020 | Outstanding Achievement for Animated Effects in an Animated Production | Alexis Angelidis, Amit Ganapati Baadkar, Greg Gladstone, Kylie Wijsmuller, and Matthew Kiyoshi Wong | Nominated | |
| Annie Awards | January 25, 2020 | Outstanding Achievement for Editorial in an Animated Feature Production | Axel Geddes, Torbin Xan Bullock, and Greg Snyder | Nominated | |
| Annie Awards | January 25, 2020 | Outstanding Achievement for Music in an Animated Feature Production | Randy Newman | Nominated | |
| Annie Awards | January 25, 2020 | Outstanding Achievement for Voice Acting in an Animated Feature Production | Tony Hale | Nominated | |
| Annie Awards | January 25, 2020 | Outstanding Achievement for Writing in an Animated Feature Production | Andrew Stanton and Stephany Folsom | Nominated | |
| Art Directors Guild Awards | February 1, 2020 | Excellence in Production Design for an Animated Film | Bob Pauley | Won | |
| Artios Awards | January 30, 2020 | Animation | Kevin Reher and Natalie Lyon | Won (Note: Tied with The Lion King (2019)) | |
| Austin Film Critics Association Awards | January 7, 2020 | Best Animated Film | Toy Story 4 | Won | |
| Black Reel Awards | February 6, 2020 | Outstanding Voice Performance | Keegan-Michael Key | Nominated | |
| Black Reel Awards | February 6, 2020 | Outstanding Voice Performance | Jordan Peele | Nominated | |
| British Academy Children's Awards | December 1, 2019 | Feature Film | Toy Story 4 | Nominated | |
| British Academy Film Awards | February 2, 2020 | Best Animated Film | Josh Cooley and Mark Nielsen | Nominated | |
| Boston Society of Film Critics Awards | December 15, 2019 | Best Animated Film | Toy Story 4 | Runner-up | |
| Capri Hollywood International Film Festival | January 2, 2020 | Best Animated Film | Toy Story 4 | Won | |
| Chicago Film Critics Association Awards | December 14, 2019 | Best Animated Film | Toy Story 4 | Won | |
| Cinema Audio Society Awards | January 25, 2020 | Outstanding Achievement in Sound Mixing for a Motion Picture – Animated | Doc Kane, Nathan Nance, Michael Semanick, David Bouche, Vince Caro, and Scott Curtis | Won | |
| Critics' Choice Movie Awards | January 12, 2020 | Best Animated Feature | Toy Story 4 | Won | |
| Dallas–Fort Worth Film Critics Association Awards | December 16, 2019 | Best Animated Film | Toy Story 4 | Won | |
| Detroit Film Critics Society Awards | December 9, 2019 | Best Animated Feature | Toy Story 4 | Won | |
| Florida Film Critics Circle Awards | December 23, 2019 | Best Animated Film | Toy Story 4 | Nominated | |
| Georgia Film Critics Association Awards | January 10, 2020 | Best Animated Film | Toy Story 4 | Won | |
| Golden Globe Awards | January 5, 2020 | Best Animated Feature Film | Toy Story 4 | Nominated | |
| Golden Raspberry Awards | March 16, 2020 | Razzie Redeemer Award | Keanu Reeves (Note: Also for John Wick: Chapter 3 – Parabellum (2019)) | Nominated | |
| Golden Reel Awards | January 19, 2020 | Outstanding Achievement in Sound Editing – Sound Effects, Foley, Dialogue and ADR for Animated Feature Film | Coya Elliott, Ren Klyce, Cheryl Nardi, Kimberly Patrick, Qianbaihui Yang, Jonathon Stevens, Thom Brennan, James Spencer, John Roesch, and Shelley Roden | Won | |
| Golden Trailer Awards | May 29, 2019 | Best Animation/Family | "Stories" (MOCEAN) | Won | |
| Golden Trailer Awards | May 29, 2019 | Best Animation/Family TV Spot (for a Feature Film) | "Carnival" (Workshop Creative) | Nominated | |
| Golden Trailer Awards | July 22, 2021 | Best Home Ent Animation/Family | "Favorite Friends" (Aspect Ratio) | Nominated | |
| Grammy Awards | January 26, 2020 | Best Song Written for Visual Media | Randy Newman for "The Ballad of the Lonesome Cowboy" | Nominated | |
| Hollywood Critics Association Awards | January 9, 2020 | Best Animated Film | Toy Story 4 | Won | |
| Hollywood Critics Association Awards | January 9, 2020 | Best Visual Effects or Animated Performance | Tom Hanks | Nominated | |
| Hollywood Film Awards | November 3, 2019 | Hollywood Animation Award | Toy Story 4 | Won | |
| Houston Film Critics Society Awards | January 2, 2020 | Best Animated Film | Toy Story 4 | Won | |
| Humanitas Prize | January 24, 2020 | Family Feature Film | John Lasseter, Andrew Stanton, Josh Cooley, Valerie LaPointe, Rashida Jones, Will McCormack, Martin Hynes, and Stephany Folsom | Nominated | |
| International Cinephile Society Awards | February 7, 2020 | Best Animated Film | Toy Story 4 | Nominated | |
| Kansas City Film Critics Circle Awards | December 15, 2019 | Best Animated Feature | Toy Story 4 | Won | |
| Los Angeles Film Critics Association Awards | December 8, 2019 | Best Animated Film | Toy Story 4 | Runner-up | |
| Movieguide Awards | January 24, 2020 | Best Movie for Families | Toy Story 4 | Nominated | |
| National Film & TV Awards | December 3, 2019 | Best Animated Film | Toy Story 4 | Won | |
| National Film & TV Awards | December 3, 2019 | Best Performance in an Animated Movie | Tom Hanks | Nominated | |
| Nickelodeon Kids' Choice Awards | May 2, 2020 | Favorite Animated Movie | Toy Story 4 | Nominated | |
| Nickelodeon Kids' Choice Awards | May 2, 2020 | Favorite Male Voice from an Animated Movie | Tom Hanks | Nominated | |
| Online Film Critics Society Awards | January 6, 2020 | Best Animated Film | Toy Story 4 | Won | |
| People's Choice Awards | November 10, 2019 | Favorite Movie | Toy Story 4 | Nominated | |
| People's Choice Awards | November 10, 2019 | Favorite Family Movie | Toy Story 4 | Nominated | |
| People's Choice Awards | November 10, 2019 | Animated Movie Star | Tom Hanks | Nominated | |
| Producers Guild of America Awards | January 18, 2020 | Best Animated Motion Picture | Mark Nielsen and Jonas Rivera | Won | |
| San Diego Film Critics Society Awards | December 9, 2019 | Best Animated Feature | Toy Story 4 | Runner-up | |
| San Francisco Bay Area Film Critics Circle Awards | December 16, 2019 | Best Animated Feature | Toy Story 4 | Nominated | |
| Satellite Awards | December 19, 2019 | Best Animated or Mixed Media Feature | Toy Story 4 | Nominated | |
| Satellite Awards | December 19, 2019 | Best Original Song | Randy Newman for "The Ballad of the Lonesome Cowboy" | Nominated | |
| Saturn Awards | September 13, 2019 | Best Animated Film | Toy Story 4 | Nominated | |
| Saturn Awards | September 13, 2019 | Best Fantasy Film | Toy Story 4 | Won | |
| Seattle Film Critics Society Awards | December 16, 2019 | Best Animated Feature | Toy Story 4 | Won | |
| St. Louis Film Critics Association Awards | December 15, 2019 | Best Animated Feature | Toy Story 4 | Won | |
| Teen Choice Awards | August 11, 2019 | Choice Summer Movie | Toy Story 4 | Nominated | |
| Toronto Film Critics Association Awards | December 8, 2019 | Best Animated Film | Toy Story 4 | Nominated | |
| Visual Effects Society Awards | January 29, 2020 | Outstanding Created Environment in an Animated Feature | Josh Cooley, Mark Nielsen, Bob Moyer, and Gary Bruins | Nominated | |
| Visual Effects Society Awards | January 29, 2020 | Outstanding Animated Character in an Animated Feature | Radford Hurn, Tanja Krampfert, George Nguyen, and Becki Rocha Tower for "Bo Peep" | Nominated | |
| Visual Effects Society Awards | January 29, 2020 | Outstanding Created Environment in an Animated Feature | Hosuk Chang, Andrew Finley, Alison Leaf, and Philip Shoebottom for "Antique Mall" | Won | |
| Visual Effects Society Awards | January 29, 2020 | Outstanding Effects Simulations in an Animated Feature | Alexis Angelidis, Amit Baadkar, Lyon Liew, and Michael Lorenzen | Nominated | |
| Visual Effects Society Awards | January 29, 2020 | Outstanding Virtual Cinematography in a CG Project | Jean-Claude Kalache and Patrick Lin | Nominated | |
| Washington D.C. Area Film Critics Association Awards | December 8, 2019 | Best Animated Feature | Toy Story 4 | Nominated | |
| Washington D.C. Area Film Critics Association Awards | December 8, 2019 | Best Voice Performance | Tom Hanks | Nominated | |
| Washington D.C. Area Film Critics Association Awards | December 8, 2019 | Best Voice Performance | Tony Hale | Won | |
| Washington D.C. Area Film Critics Association Awards | December 8, 2019 | Best Voice Performance | Annie Potts | Nominated | |

=== Onward ===
Onward is a 2020 American animated urban fantasy-adventure film produced by Pixar Animation Studios and released by Walt Disney Pictures. The film is directed by Dan Scanlon, produced by Kori Rae and written by Scanlon, Jason Headley, and Keith Bunin, and stars the voices of Tom Holland, Chris Pratt, Julia Louis-Dreyfus, and Octavia Spencer.

| Year | Award | Category | Recipients | Result | Ref. |
|---|---|---|---|---|---|
| 2020 | BMI Film & TV Awards | Film Music | Mychael Danna and Jeff Danna | Won | |
| 2020 | People's Choice Awards | The Family Movie of 2020 | Onward | Won | |
| 2020 | Dublin International Film Festival | Feature Film | Onward | Won | |
| 2020 | Hollywood Critics Association Midseason Awards | Best Picture | Onward | Nominated | |
| 2020 | Houston Film Critics Society Awards | Best Animated Feature Film | Onward | Nominated | |
| 2020 | San Diego Film Critics Society Awards | Best Animated Film | Onward | Nominated | |
| 2020 | St. Louis Film Critics Association Awards | Best Animated Film | Onward | Nominated | |
| 2021 | Academy Awards | Best Animated Feature | Dan Scanlon and Kori Rae | Nominated | |
| 2021 | American Cinema Editors Awards | Best Edited Animated Feature Film | Catherine Apple | Nominated | |
| 2021 | Annie Awards | Best Animated Feature | Kori Rae | Nominated | |
| 2021 | Annie Awards | Writing in an Animated Feature Production | Dan Scanlon, Jason Headley and Keith Bunin | Nominated | |
| 2021 | Annie Awards | Editorial in an Animated Feature Production | Catherine Apple, Anna Wolitzky and Dave Suther | Nominated | |
| 2021 | Annie Awards | Outstanding Achievement for Character Animation in an Animated Feature Production | Shaun Chacko | Nominated | |
| 2021 | Annie Awards | Outstanding Achievement for Music in an Animated Feature Production | Mychael Danna and Jeff Danna | Nominated | |
| 2021 | Annie Awards | Outstanding Achievement for Production Design in an Animated Feature Production | Noah Klocek, Sharon Calahan, Huy Nguyen, Bert Berry and Paul Conrad | Nominated | |
| 2021 | Annie Awards | Outstanding Achievement for Voice Acting in an Animated Feature Production | Tom Holland | Nominated | |
| 2021 | Art Directors Guild Awards | Excellence in Production Design for an Animated Film | Noah Klocek | Nominated | |
| 2021 | Austin Film Critics Association Awards | Best Animated Film | Onward | Nominated | |
| 2021 | British Academy Film Awards | Best Animated Film | Dan Scanlon and Kori Rae | Nominated | |
| 2021 | Cinema Audio Society Awards | Outstanding Achievement in Sound Mixing for a Motion Picture – Animated | Vincent Caro, Doc Kane, Michael Semanick, Juan Peralta, Brad Haehnel and Scott Curtis | Nominated | |
| 2021 | Critics' Choice Super Awards | Best Animated Movie | Onward | Nominated | |
| 2021 | Critics' Choice Super Awards | Best Voice Actor In An Animated Movie | Tom Holland | Nominated | |
| 2021 | Critics' Choice Super Awards | Best Voice Actor In An Animated Movie | Chris Pratt | Nominated | |
| 2021 | Critics' Choice Super Awards | Best Voice Actress In An Animated Movie | Octavia Spencer | Nominated | |
| 2021 | Golden Globe Awards | Best Animated Feature Film | Onward | Nominated | |
| 2021 | Grammy Awards | Best Song Written for Visual Media | "Carried Me with You" – Brandi Carlile, Phil Hanseroth and Tim Hanseroth | Nominated | |
| 2021 | Hollywood Music in Media Awards | Best Original Score in an Animated Film | Mychael Danna and Jeff Danna | Nominated | |
| 2021 | Hollywood Music in Media Awards | Best Original Song in an Animated Film | "Carried Me with You" – Brandi Carlile, Phil Hanseroth and Tim Hanseroth | Nominated | |
| 2021 | Hollywood Music in Media Awards | Best Soundtrack Album | Onward | Nominated | |
| 2021 | Motion Picture Sound Editors Awards | Outstanding Achievement in Sound Editing – Feature Animation | Shannon Mills, Nia Hansen, Chris Gridley, Josh Gold, David C. Hughes, Samson Neslund, Kimberly Patrick, Christopher Flick, Steve Orlando, Erich Stratmann, Shelley Roden and John Roesch | Nominated | |
| 2021 | Nickelodeon Kids' Choice Awards | Favorite Animated Movie | Onward | Nominated | |
| 2021 | Nickelodeon Kids' Choice Awards | Favorite Voice from an Animated Movie | Chris Pratt | Nominated | |
| 2021 | Saturn Awards | Best Animated Film | Onward | Won | |
| 2021 | Visual Effects Society Awards | Outstanding Visual Effects in an Animated Feature | Dan Scanlon, Kori Rae, Sanjay Bakshi and Vincent Serritella | Nominated | |
| 2021 | Visual Effects Society Awards | Outstanding Animated Character in an Animated Feature | Kristopher Campbell, Jonas Jarvers, Rob Jensen and Jacob Kuenzel (for Dad Pants) | Nominated | |
| 2021 | Visual Effects Society Awards | Outstanding Created Environment in an Animated Feature | Eric Andraos, Laura Grieve, Nick Pitera and Michael Rutter (for Swamp Gas) | Nominated | |
| 2021 | Visual Effects Society Awards | Outstanding Effects Simulations in an Animated Feature | Dave Hale, Jonah Blue Laird, Stephen Marshall and Ricardo Nadu | Nominated | |

=== Soul ===
Soul is a 2020 American animated fantasy comedy-drama film produced by Pixar Animation Studios and released by Walt Disney Pictures. Directed by Pete Docter and co-directed by Kemp Powers, the film stars the voices of Jamie Foxx, Tina Fey, Graham Norton, Rachel House, Alice Braga, Richard Ayoade, Phylicia Rashad, Donnell Rawlings, Questlove, and Angela Bassett.

Accolades received by Soul (2020 film)
| Award | Date of ceremony | Category | Recipient(s) | Result | Ref. |
|---|---|---|---|---|---|
| AACTA International Awards | March 5, 2021 | Best Direction | Pete Docter | Nominated | |
| Academy Awards | April 25, 2021 | Best Animated Feature | Pete Docter and Dana Murray | Won | |
| Academy Awards | April 25, 2021 | Best Original Score | Trent Reznor, Atticus Ross, and Jon Batiste | Won | |
| Academy Awards | April 25, 2021 | Best Sound | Ren Klyce, Coya Elliott, and David Parker | Nominated | |
| Alliance of Women Film Journalists Awards | January 4, 2021 | Best Animated Feature Film | Soul | Won | |
| Alliance of Women Film Journalists Awards | January 4, 2021 | Best Animated Female | Tina Fey | Won | |
| American Cinema Editors Awards | April 17, 2021 | Best Edited Animated Feature Film | Kevin Nolting | Won | |
| American Film Institute Awards | February 26, 2021 | Top 10 Films of the Year | Soul | Won | |
| Annie Awards | April 16, 2021 | Best Animated Feature | Soul | Won | |
| Annie Awards | April 16, 2021 | Best FX – Feature | Tolga Göktekin, Carl Kaphan, Hiroaki Narita, Enrique Vila, and Kylie Wijsmuller | Won | |
| Annie Awards | April 16, 2021 | Best Character Animation – Feature | Michal Makarewicz | Won | |
| Annie Awards | April 16, 2021 | Best Character Design – Feature | Daniel López Muñoz | Nominated | |
| Annie Awards | April 16, 2021 | Best Direction – Feature | Pete Docter and Kemp Powers | Nominated | |
| Annie Awards | April 16, 2021 | Best Music – Feature | Trent Reznor, Atticus Ross, and Jon Batiste | Won | |
| Annie Awards | April 16, 2021 | Best Production Design – Feature | Steve Pilcher, Albert Lozano, Paul Abadilla, and Bryn Imagire | Nominated | |
| Annie Awards | April 16, 2021 | Best Storyboarding – Feature | Trevor Jimenez | Won | |
| Annie Awards | April 16, 2021 | Best Writing – Feature | Pete Docter, Mike Jones, and Kemp Powers | Won | |
| Annie Awards | April 16, 2021 | Best Editorial – Feature | Kevin Nolting, Gregory Amundson, Robert Grahamjones, and Amera Rizk | Won | |
| Art Directors Guild Awards | April 10, 2021 | Excellence in Production Design for an Animated Film | Steve Pilcher | Won | |
| Artios Awards | April 15, 2021 | Film Animation | Kevin Reher, Natalie Lyon, and Kate Hansen-Birnbaum | Won | |
| Austin Film Critics Association Awards | March 19, 2021 | Best Animated Film | Soul | Nominated | |
| Austin Film Critics Association Awards | March 19, 2021 | Best Score | Trent Reznor, Atticus Ross, and Jon Batiste | Won | |
| Black Reel Awards | April 11, 2021 | Outstanding Film | Dana Murray | Nominated | |
| Black Reel Awards | April 11, 2021 | Outstanding Screenplay, Adapted or Original | Pete Docter, Mike Jones, and Kemp Powers | Nominated | |
| Black Reel Awards | April 11, 2021 | Outstanding Score | Trent Reznor, Atticus Ross, and Jon Batiste | Won | |
| Black Reel Awards | April 11, 2021 | Outstanding Voice Performance | Angela Bassett | Nominated | |
| Black Reel Awards | April 11, 2021 | Outstanding Voice Performance | Jamie Foxx | Won | |
| Black Reel Awards | April 11, 2021 | Outstanding Voice Performance | Phylicia Rashad | Nominated | |
| British Academy Film Awards | April 11, 2021 | Best Animated Film | Pete Docter and Dana Murray | Won | |
| British Academy Film Awards | April 11, 2021 | Best Original Music | Jon Batiste, Trent Reznor, and Atticus Ross | Won | |
| British Academy Film Awards | April 11, 2021 | Best Sound | Coya Elliott, Ren Klyce, and David Parker | Nominated | |
| Chicago Film Critics Association | December 21, 2020 | Best Animated Film | Pete Docter and Dana Murray | Nominated | |
| Chicago Film Critics Association | December 21, 2020 | Best Original Screenplay | Pete Docter, Mike Jones, and Kemp Powers | Nominated | |
| Chicago Film Critics Association | December 21, 2020 | Best Original Score | Trent Reznor, Atticus Ross, and Jon Batiste | Won | |
| Cinema Audio Society Awards | April 17, 2021 | Outstanding Achievement in Sound Mixing for a Motion Picture – Animated | Vincent Caro, Ren Klyce, David Parker, Atticus Ross, David Boucher, Bobby Johanson, and Scott Curtis | Won | |
| Critics' Choice Movie Awards | March 7, 2021 | Best Score | Trent Reznor, Atticus Ross, and Jon Batiste | Won | |
| Critics' Choice Super Awards | January 10, 2021 | Best Animated Movie | Soul | Won | |
| Critics' Choice Super Awards | January 10, 2021 | Best Voice Actor in an Animated Movie | Jamie Foxx | Won | |
| Critics' Choice Super Awards | January 10, 2021 | Best Voice Actress in an Animated Movie | Tina Fey | Won | |
| Florida Film Critics Circle Awards | December 21, 2020 | Best Original Screenplay | Pete Docter, Mike Jones, and Kemp Powers | Nominated | |
| Florida Film Critics Circle Awards | December 21, 2020 | Best Score | Trent Reznor, Atticus Ross, and Jon Batiste | Won | |
| Florida Film Critics Circle Awards | December 21, 2020 | Best Animated Film | Soul | Won | |
| Golden Globe Awards | February 28, 2021 | Best Animated Feature Film | Pete Docter, Kemp Powers and Dana Murray | Won | |
| Golden Globe Awards | February 28, 2021 | Best Original Score | Trent Reznor, Atticus Ross, and Jon Batiste | Won | |
| Golden Reel Awards | April 16, 2021 | Outstanding Achievement in Sound Editing – Feature Animation | Coya Elliott, Cheryl Nardi, Ren Klyce, Steve Orlando, Kimberly Patrick, Jonathan Stevens, Thom Brennan, Shelley Roden, John Roesch, and Dee Selby | Won | |
| Golden Trailer Awards | July 22, 2021 | Best Animation/Family | "Chicken Soup" (The Hive) | Won | |
| Golden Trailer Awards | July 22, 2021 | Best Animation/Family | "Live" (Rogue Planet) | Nominated | |
| Golden Trailer Awards | July 22, 2021 | Best Animation/Family TV Spot | "In It" (Ignition Creative) | Nominated | |
| Golden Trailer Awards | July 22, 2021 | Best Home Ent Animation/Family | "Target Wall" (Tiny Hero) | Nominated | |
| Golden Trailer Awards | July 22, 2021 | Best Motion Poster | "Virtual Jazz Show" (ZEALOT) | Won | |
| Golden Trailer Awards | July 22, 2021 | Best Animation TrailerByte for a Feature Film | "Virtual Jazz Show" (ZEALOT) | Won | |
| Golden Trailer Awards | July 22, 2021 | Best BTS/EPK for a Feature Film (Under 2 Minutes) | "Live Soulfully — Passions" (ZEALOT) | Nominated | |
| Grammy Awards | April 3, 2022 | Best Improvised Jazz Solo | Jon Batiste for "Bigger Than Us" | Nominated | |
| Grammy Awards | April 3, 2022 | Best Jazz Instrumental Album | Jon Batiste for Jazz Selections: Music from and Inspired by Soul | Nominated | |
| Grammy Awards | April 3, 2022 | Best Score Soundtrack for Visual Media | Jon Batiste, Trent Reznor, and Atticus Ross for Soul: Original Motion Picture Soundtrack | Won | |
| Hollywood Critics Association Awards | March 5, 2021 | Best Picture | Soul | Nominated | |
| Hollywood Critics Association Awards | March 5, 2021 | Best Animated or VFX Performance | Jamie Foxx | Nominated | |
| Hollywood Critics Association Awards | March 5, 2021 | Best Animated or VFX Performance | Tina Fey | Nominated | |
| Hollywood Critics Association Awards | March 5, 2021 | Best Animated Film | Soul | Nominated | |
| Hollywood Critics Association Awards | March 5, 2021 | Best Score | Jon Batiste, Trent Reznor, and Atticus Ross | Won | |
| Hollywood Music in Media Awards | January 27, 2021 | Best Original Score – Animated Film | Trent Reznor, Atticus Ross, and Jon Batiste | Won | |
| Hollywood Music in Media Awards | January 27, 2021 | Outstanding Music Supervision – Film | Tom MacDougall | Nominated | |
| Hollywood Music in Media Awards | January 27, 2021 | Best Soundtrack Album | Soul: Original Motion Picture Soundtrack | Nominated | |
| Houston Film Critics Society Awards | January 18, 2021 | Best Picture | Soul | Nominated | |
| Houston Film Critics Society Awards | January 18, 2021 | Best Animated Feature Film | Soul | Won | |
| Houston Film Critics Society Awards | January 18, 2021 | Best Original Score | Trent Reznor and Atticus Ross | Won | |
| Hugo Awards | December 18, 2021 | Best Dramatic Presentation, Long Form | Pete Docter, Mike Jones, Kemp Powers, and Dana Murray | Nominated | |
| International Film Music Critics Association Awards | February 18, 2021 | Best Original Score for an Animated Film | Trent Reznor, Atticus Ross, and Jon Batiste | Nominated | |
| London Critics Circle Film Awards | February 7, 2021 | Technical Achievement Award | Pete Docter | Nominated | |
| Los Angeles Film Critics Association Awards | December 20, 2020 | Best Animated Film | Soul | Runner-up | |
| Los Angeles Film Critics Association Awards | December 20, 2020 | Best Music | Trent Reznor and Atticus Ross | Won | |
| MTV Movie & TV Awards | May 16, 2021 | Best Movie | Soul | Nominated | |
| NAACP Image Awards | March 27, 2021 | Outstanding Animated Motion Picture | Soul | Won | |
| NAACP Image Awards | March 27, 2021 | Outstanding Writing in a Motion Picture | Pete Docter, Kemp Powers, and Mike Jones | Nominated | |
| NAACP Image Awards | March 27, 2021 | Outstanding Ensemble Cast in a Motion Picture | Soul | Nominated | |
| NAACP Image Awards | March 27, 2021 | Outstanding Soundtrack/Compilation Album | Soul: Original Motion Picture Soundtrack | Won | |
| NAACP Image Awards | March 27, 2021 | Outstanding Jazz Album – Instrumental | Music From and Inspired by Soul | Won | |
| NAACP Image Awards | March 27, 2021 | Outstanding Character Voice Performance – Motion Picture | Ahmir-Khalib Thompson | Nominated | |
| NAACP Image Awards | March 27, 2021 | Outstanding Character Voice Performance – Motion Picture | Angela Bassett | Nominated | |
| NAACP Image Awards | March 27, 2021 | Outstanding Character Voice Performance – Motion Picture | Jamie Foxx | Won | |
| NAACP Image Awards | March 27, 2021 | Outstanding Character Voice Performance – Motion Picture | Phylicia Rashad | Nominated | |
| National Board of Review | January 26, 2021 | Best Animated Film | Pete Docter | Won | |
| National Board of Review | January 26, 2021 | Top 10 Films | Soul | Won | |
| Nickelodeon Kids' Choice Awards | March 13, 2021 | Favorite Animated Movie | Soul | Won | |
| Nickelodeon Kids' Choice Awards | March 13, 2021 | Favorite Voice from an Animated Movie | Tina Fey | Nominated | |
| Nickelodeon Kids' Choice Awards | March 13, 2021 | Favorite Voice from an Animated Movie | Jamie Foxx | Nominated | |
| Online Film Critics Society Awards | January 25, 2021 | Best Picture | Soul | Nominated | |
| Online Film Critics Society Awards | January 25, 2021 | Best Animated Film | Soul | Won | |
| Online Film Critics Society Awards | January 25, 2021 | Best Original Score | Trent Reznor and Atticus Ross | Won | |
| Producers Guild of America Awards | March 24, 2021 | Best Animated Motion Picture | Dana Murray | Won | |
| San Diego Film Critics Society Awards | January 11, 2021 | Best Animated Film | Soul | Nominated | |
| San Francisco Bay Area Film Critics Circle | January 18, 2021 | Best Animated Feature | Soul | Won | |
| San Francisco Bay Area Film Critics Circle | January 18, 2021 | Best Original Score | Trent Reznor and Atticus Ross | Won | |
| Satellite Awards | February 15, 2021 | Best Animated or Mixed Media Film | Soul | Nominated | |
| Satellite Awards | February 15, 2021 | Best Original Screenplay | Pete Docter, Mike Jones, and Kemp Powers | Nominated | |
| St. Louis Gateway Film Critics Association Awards | January 17, 2021 | Best Animated Feature | Soul | Won | |
| St. Louis Gateway Film Critics Association Awards | January 17, 2021 | Best Music Score | Trent Reznor, Atticus Ross, and Jon Batiste | Won | |
| Toronto Film Critics Association Awards | February 7, 2021 | Best Animated Film | Soul | Runner-up (Note: Shared with The Willoughbys (2020)) | |
| Visual Effects Society Awards | April 6, 2021 | Outstanding Visual Effects in an Animated Feature | Pete Docter, Dana Murray, Michael Fong, and Bill Watral | Won | |
| Visual Effects Society Awards | April 6, 2021 | Outstanding Animated Character in an Animated Feature | Jonathan Hoffman, Jonathan Page, Peter Tieryas, and Ron Zorman for "Terry" | Won | |
| Visual Effects Society Awards | April 6, 2021 | Outstanding Created Environment in an Animated Feature | Hosuk Chang, Sungyeon Joh, Peter Roe, and Frank Tai for "You Seminar" | Won | |
| Visual Effects Society Awards | April 6, 2021 | Outstanding Virtual Cinematography in a CG Project | Matt Aspbury and Ian Megibben | Won | |
| Visual Effects Society Awards | April 6, 2021 | Outstanding Effects Simulations in an Animated Feature | Alexis Angelidis, Keith Daniel Klohn, Aimei Kutt, and Melissa Tseng | Won | |
| Washington D.C. Area Film Critics Association Awards | February 8, 2021 | Best Animated Feature | Soul | Won | |
| Washington D.C. Area Film Critics Association Awards | February 8, 2021 | Best Score | Trent Reznor, Atticus Ross, and Jon Batiste | Won | |
| Washington D.C. Area Film Critics Association Awards | February 8, 2021 | Best Voice Performance | Jamie Foxx | Won | |
| Washington D.C. Area Film Critics Association Awards | February 8, 2021 | Best Voice Performance | Tina Fey | Nominated | |

=== Luca ===
Luca is a 2021 American animated coming-of-age fantasy film produced by Pixar Animation Studios and distributed by Walt Disney Studios Motion Pictures. The film was directed by Enrico Casarosa (in his feature-length directorial debut), written by Jesse Andrews and Mike Jones, from a story by Casarosa, Andrews, and Simon Stephenson, produced by Andrea Warren, and features the voices of Jacob Tremblay and Jack Dylan Grazer, with Emma Berman, Saverio Raimondo, Marco Barricelli, Maya Rudolph, Jim Gaffigan, Peter Sohn, Lorenzo Crisci, Marina Massironi, and Sandy Martin in supporting roles.

Accolades received by Luca (2021 film)
| Award | Date of ceremony | Category | Recipient(s) | Result | Ref. |
|---|---|---|---|---|---|
| Academy Awards | March 27, 2022 | Best Animated Feature | Enrico Casarosa, Andrea Warren | Nominated | |
| American Cinema Editors Awards | March 5, 2022 | Best Edited Animated Feature Film | Catherine Apple, Jason Hudak | Nominated | |
| ADG Excellence in Production Design Awards | March 5, 2022 | Excellence in Production Design for an Animated Film | Daniela Strijleva | Nominated | |
| Alliance of Women Film Journalists | January 25, 2022 | Best Animated Film | Luca | Nominated | |
| Alliance of Women Film Journalists | January 25, 2022 | Best Animated Female | Emma Berman | Nominated | |
| Annie Awards | March 12, 2022 | Best Animated Feature | Luca | Nominated | |
| Annie Awards | March 12, 2022 | Best Character Animation – Feature | Tarun Lak | Nominated | |
| Annie Awards | March 12, 2022 | Best Character Design – Feature | Deanna Marsigliese | Nominated | |
| Annie Awards | March 12, 2022 | Best Direction – Feature | Enrico Casarosa | Nominated | |
| Annie Awards | March 12, 2022 | Best Music – Feature | Dan Romer | Nominated | |
| Annie Awards | March 12, 2022 | Best Voice Acting – Feature | Jack Dylan Grazer | Nominated | |
| Annie Awards | March 12, 2022 | Best Writing – Feature | Jesse Andrews, Mike Jones | Nominated | |
| Annie Awards | March 12, 2022 | Best Editorial – Feature | Catherine Apple, Jason Hudak, Jennifer Jew, Tim Fox, David Suther | Nominated | |
| Austin Film Critics Association | January 11, 2022 | Best Animated Film | Luca | Nominated | |
| British Academy Film Awards | March 13, 2022 | Best Animated Film | Enrico Casarosa, Andrea Warren | Nominated | |
| Black Reel Awards | February 27, 2022 | Outstanding Voice Performance | Maya Rudolph | Nominated | |
| Cinema Audio Society Awards | March 19, 2022 | Outstanding Achievement in Sound Mixing for a Motion Picture – Animated | Vince Caro, Christopher Scarabosio, Tony Villaflor, Greg Hayes, Jason Butler, Richard Duarte | Nominated | |
| Chicago Film Critics Association | December 15, 2021 | Best Animated Film | Luca | Nominated | |
| Critics' Choice Movie Awards | March 13, 2022 | Best Animated Feature | Luca | Nominated | |
| Dallas–Fort Worth Film Critics Association | December 20, 2021 | Best Animated Film | Luca | Nominated | |
| Detroit Film Critics Society | January 5, 2022 | Best Animated Feature | Luca | Nominated | |
| Florida Film Critics Circle | December 22, 2021 | Best Animated Film | Luca | Nominated | |
| Georgia Film Critics Association | January 14, 2022 | Best Animated Film | Luca | Nominated | |
| Golden Globe Awards | January 9, 2022 | Best Animated Feature Film | Luca | Nominated | |
| Hollywood Critics Association | July 1, 2021 | Midseason Award – Best Picture | Luca | Nominated | |
| Hollywood Critics Association | February 28, 2022 | Best Animated Film | Luca | Nominated | |
| Hollywood Critics Association | February 28, 2022 | Best Animated or VSX Performance | Jacob Tremblay | Nominated | |
| Hollywood Music in Media Awards | November 17, 2021 | Original Score — Animated Film | Dan Romer | Nominated | |
| Houston Film Critics Society | January 19, 2022 | Best Animated Feature | Luca | Nominated | |
| Motion Picture Sound Editors Golden Reel Awards | March 13, 2022 | Outstanding Achievement in Sound Editing – Feature Animation | Chris Scarabosio, André Fenley, Rich Quinn, Ronni Brown, Justin Doyle, Pascal Garneau, E. Larry Oatfield, Jana Vance, Ronni Brown, Lodge Worster | Nominated | |
| NAACP Image Awards | February 26, 2022 | Outstanding Animated Motion Picture | Luca | Nominated | |
| Nickelodeon Kids' Choice Awards | April 9, 2022 | Favorite Animated Movie | Luca | Nominated | |
| Online Film Critics Society | January 24, 2022 | Best Animated Feature | Luca | Nominated | |
| People's Choice Awards | December 7, 2021 | Family Movie of 2021 | Luca | Won | |
| Producers Guild of America Awards | March 19, 2022 | Outstanding Producer of Animated Theatrical Motion Pictures | Andrea Warren | Nominated | |
| San Diego Film Critics Society | January 10, 2022 | Best Animated Film | Luca | Won | |
| San Francisco Bay Area Film Critics Circle | January 10, 2022 | Best Animated Feature | Luca | Nominated | |
| Satellite Awards | April 2, 2022 | Best Animated or Mixed Media Film | Luca | Nominated | |
| Saturn Awards | October 25, 2022 | Best Animated Film | Luca | Nominated | |
| Saturn Awards | October 25, 2022 | Best Performance by a Younger Actor | Jacob Tremblay | Nominated | |
| Seattle Film Critics Society | January 17, 2022 | Best Animated Feature | Luca | Nominated | |
| St. Louis Film Critics Association | December 19, 2021 | Best Animated Film | Luca | Nominated | |
| Visual Effects Society Awards | March 8, 2022 | Outstanding Visual Effects in an Animated Feature | Enrico Casarosa, Andrea Warren, David Ryu, Jon Reisch | Nominated | |
| Visual Effects Society Awards | March 8, 2022 | Outstanding Animated Character in an Animated Feature | Gwendelyn Enderoglu, Laurie Nguyen Kim, Tanja Krampfert, Maria Lee (for Luca) | Nominated | |
| Visual Effects Society Awards | March 8, 2022 | Outstanding Created Environment in an Animated Feature | Airton Dittz, Jr., Jack Hattori, Michael Rutter, Joshua West (for Portorosso Piazza) | Nominated | |
| Visual Effects Society Awards | March 8, 2022 | Outstanding Effects Simulations in an Animated Feature | Amit Baadkar, Greg Gladstone, Emron Grover, Tim Speltz | Nominated | |
| Washington D.C. Area Film Critics Association | December 6, 2021 | Best Animated Film | Luca | Nominated | |
| Washington D.C. Area Film Critics Association | December 6, 2021 | Best Voice Performance | Jacob Tremblay | Nominated | |

=== Turning Red ===
Turning Red is a 2022 American animated fantasy comedy film produced by Pixar Animation Studios and distributed by Walt Disney Studios Motion Pictures. It was directed by Domee Shi (in her feature directorial debut) and produced by Lindsey Collins, from a screenplay written by Shi and Julia Cho, and a story by Shi, Cho, and Sarah Streicher. The film marks the first Pixar feature film solely directed by a woman. It stars the voices of Rosalie Chiang, Sandra Oh, Ava Morse, Hyein Park, Maitreyi Ramakrishnan, Orion Lee, Wai Ching Ho, Tristan Allerick Chen, and James Hong. Set in Toronto, Ontario in 2002, the film follows Meilin "Mei" Lee (Chiang), a 13-year-old Chinese-Canadian student who transforms into a giant red panda when she experiences any strong emotion, due to a hereditary curse.

Accolades received by Turning Red
| Award | Date of ceremony | Category | Recipient(s) | Result | Ref. |
|---|---|---|---|---|---|
| Academy Awards | March 12, 2023 | Best Animated Feature Film | Domee Shi and Lindsey Collins | Nominated | |
| Alliance of Women Film Journalists Awards | January 5, 2023 | Best Animated Film | Turning Red | Nominated | |
| Alliance of Women Film Journalists Awards | January 5, 2023 | Best Woman Screenwriter | Domee Shi | Nominated | |
| Alliance of Women Film Journalists Awards | January 5, 2023 | Best Animated Female | Rosalie Chiang | Nominated | |
| Alliance of Women Film Journalists Awards | January 5, 2023 | Best Animated Female | Sandra Oh | Nominated | |
| American Cinema Editors Awards | March 5, 2023 | Best Edited Animated Feature Film | Nicholas C. Smith and Steve Bloom | Nominated | |
| Annie Awards | February 25, 2023 | Best Animated Feature | Turning Red | Nominated | |
| Annie Awards | February 25, 2023 | Outstanding Achievement for Character Animation in an Animated Feature Production | Teresa Falcone | Nominated | |
| Annie Awards | February 25, 2023 | Outstanding Achievement for Character Animation in an Animated Feature Production | Eric Anderson | Nominated | |
| Annie Awards | February 25, 2023 | Outstanding Achievement for Directing in an Animated Feature Production | Domee Shi | Nominated | |
| Annie Awards | February 25, 2023 | Outstanding Achievement for Editorial in an Animated Feature Production | Nicholas Smith, Steve Bloom, David Suther, Anna Wolitzky, and Christopher Zuber | Nominated | |
| Annie Awards | February 25, 2023 | Outstanding Achievement for Music in an Animated Feature Production | Ludwig Göransson, Billie Eilish, and Finneas O'Connell | Nominated | |
| Annie Awards | February 25, 2023 | Outstanding Achievement for Writing in an Animated Feature Production | Domee Shi and Julia Cho | Nominated | |
| Art Directors Guild Awards | February 18, 2023 | Excellence in Production Design for an Animated Film | Rona Liu | Nominated | |
| Artios Awards | March 9, 2023 | Animation | Natalie Lyon, Kevin Reher, and Kate Hansen-Birnbaum | Nominated | |
| Artios Awards | March 9, 2023 | Film, Non-Theatrical Release | Kevin Reher, Natalie Lyon, and Kate Hansen-Birnbaum | Nominated | |
| Austin Film Critics Association Awards | January 10, 2023 | Best Animated Film | Turning Red | Nominated | |
| Austin Film Critics Association Awards | January 10, 2023 | Best First Film | Domee Shi | Nominated | |
| BMI Film & TV Awards | May 10, 2023 | BMI Streaming Film Awards | Ludwig Göransson (Note: Also for Black Panther: Wakanda Forever (2022) and the television series The Book of Boba Fett) | Won | |
| Boston Society of Film Critics Awards | December 11, 2022 | Best Animated Film | Turning Red | Won | |
| British Academy Film Awards | February 19, 2023 | Best Animated Film | Domee Shi and Lindsey Collins | Nominated | |
| Chicago Film Critics Association Awards | December 14, 2022 | Best Animated Film | Turning Red | Nominated | |
| Cinema Audio Society Awards | March 4, 2023 | Outstanding Achievement in Sound Mixing for a Motion Picture – Animated | Vince Caro, Stephen Urata, Ren Klyce, Chris Fogel, and Scott Curtis | Nominated | |
| Critics' Choice Movie Awards | January 15, 2023 | Best Animated Feature | Turning Red | Nominated | |
| Dorian Awards | February 23, 2023 | Animated Film of the Year | Turning Red | Nominated | |
| Florida Film Critics Circle Awards | December 22, 2022 | Best Animated Film | Turning Red | Won | |
| Georgia Film Critics Association Awards | January 13, 2023 | Best Animated Film | Turning Red | Nominated | |
| Golden Globe Awards | January 10, 2023 | Best Animated Feature Film | Turning Red | Nominated | |
| Golden Trailer Awards | October 6, 2022 | Best Animation TrailerByte for a Feature Film | "Boots and Cats" (ZEALOT) | Nominated | |
| Golden Trailer Awards | June 29, 2023 | Best Animation TrailerByte for a Feature Film | "Boots and Cats" (ZEALOT) | Won | |
| Grammy Awards | February 5, 2023 | Best Song Written for Visual Media | Billie Eilish and Finneas O'Connell for "Nobody Like U" | Nominated | |
| Guild of Music Supervisors Awards | March 5, 2023 | Best Music Supervision for Films Budgeted Over $25 Million | Tom MacDougall | Nominated | |
| Hollywood Critics Association Awards | February 24, 2023 | Best Animated Film | Turning Red | Nominated | |
| Hollywood Critics Association Awards | February 24, 2023 | Best First Feature | Domee Shi | Nominated | |
| Hollywood Critics Association Awards | February 24, 2023 | Best Voice or Motion-Capture Performance | Rosalie Chiang | Nominated | |
| Hollywood Critics Association Creative Arts Awards | February 24, 2023 | Best Song | "Nobody Like U" | Nominated | |
| Hollywood Critics Association Midseason Film Awards | July 1, 2022 | Best Picture | Turning Red | Nominated | |
| Hollywood Music in Media Awards | November 16, 2022 | Best Original Score in an Animated Film | Finneas O'Connell and Ludwig Göransson | Nominated | |
| Hollywood Music in Media Awards | November 16, 2022 | Best Original Song in an Animated Film | Billie Eilish and Finneas O'Connell for "Nobody Like U" | Nominated | |
| Hollywood Music in Media Awards | November 16, 2022 | Best Soundtrack Album | Finneas O'Connell, Ludwig Göransson, and 4*Town for Turning Red | Nominated | |
| Houston Film Critics Society Awards | February 18, 2023 | Best Animated Feature | Turning Red | Nominated | |
| Hugo Awards | October 18–22, 2023 | Best Dramatic Presentation, Long Form | Julia Cho and Domee Shi | Nominated | |
| MTV Movie & TV Awards | June 5, 2022 | Best Musical Moment | 4*Town for "Nobody Like U" | Nominated | |
| NAACP Image Awards | February 25, 2023 | Outstanding Animated Motion Picture | Turning Red | Nominated | |
| Nickelodeon Kids' Choice Awards | March 4, 2023 | Favorite Animated Movie | Turning Red | Nominated | |
| Nickelodeon Kids' Choice Awards | March 4, 2023 | Favorite Voice from an Animated Movie (Female) | Sandra Oh | Nominated | |
| Online Film Critics Society Awards | January 23, 2023 | Best Animated Feature | Turning Red | Nominated | |
| Online Film Critics Society Awards | January 23, 2023 | Best Debut Feature | Domee Shi | Nominated | |
| Producers Guild of America Awards | February 25, 2023 | Outstanding Producer of Animated Theatrical Motion Pictures | Lindsey Collins | Nominated | |
| San Diego Film Critics Society Awards | January 6, 2023 | Best Animated Film | Turning Red | Runner-up | |
| San Francisco Bay Area Film Critics Circle Awards | January 9, 2023 | Best Animated Feature | Turning Red | Nominated | |
| Satellite Awards | March 3, 2023 | Best Motion Picture – Animated or Mixed Media | Turning Red | Nominated | |
| Seattle Film Critics Society Awards | January 17, 2023 | Best Animated Feature | Turning Red | Nominated | |
| St. Louis Gateway Film Critics Association Awards | December 18, 2022 | Best Animated Feature | Turning Red | Nominated | |
| Toronto Film Critics Association Awards | January 8, 2023 | Best Animated Film | Turning Red | Won | |
| Toronto Film Critics Association Awards | January 8, 2023 | Best First Feature | Turning Red | Runner-up | |
| Visual Effects Society Awards | February 15, 2023 | Outstanding Visual Effects in an Animated Feature | Domee Shi, Lindsey Collins, Danielle Feinberg, and Dave Hale | Nominated | |
| Visual Effects Society Awards | February 15, 2023 | Outstanding Animated Character in an Animated Feature | Christopher Bolwyn, Ethan Dean, Bill Sheffler, and Kureha Yokoo for "Panda Mei" | Nominated | |
| Visual Effects Society Awards | February 15, 2023 | Emerging Technology Award | Kurt Fleischer, Fernando de Goes, and Bill Sheffler for "Profile Mover and CurveNets" | Nominated | |
| Washington D.C. Area Film Critics Association Awards | December 12, 2022 | Best Animated Feature | Turning Red | Nominated | |
| Washington D.C. Area Film Critics Association Awards | December 12, 2022 | Best Voice Performance | Rosalie Chiang | Nominated | |
| Washington D.C. Area Film Critics Association Awards | December 12, 2022 | Best Voice Performance | Sandra Oh | Nominated | |

=== Lightyear ===
Lightyear is an animated science-fiction action-adventure film produced by Pixar and released by Walt Disney Pictures.The film is a spin-off of the Toy Story film series, but does not take place in the same fictional universe as them; rather, it is presented as a film that some of the characters in the main Toy Story films have seen. Lightyear centers on the character Buzz Lightyear, who in this film is human and not a toy. Directed by Angus MacLane in his directorial debut the screenplay was written by the director himself, MacLane, and Jason Headley. The film stars Chris Evans as the voice of the titular character, with Keke Palmer, Peter Sohn, Taika Waititi, Dale Soules, James Brolin, and Uzo Aduba in supporting roles.

It is the sixth Pixar film not to have been nominated for any Academy Awards, after Cars 2, Monsters University, The Good Dinosaur, Finding Dory and Cars 3.

| Award | Year | Category | Recipient | Result | Ref. |
|---|---|---|---|---|---|
| Alliance of Women Film Journalists | 2023 | Best Animated Female Voice | Keke Palmer | Nominated | |
| Annie Awards | February 25, 2023 | Outstanding Achievement for Animated Effects in an Animated Production | Carl Kaphan, Cody Harrington, Hope Schroers, Jon Barry, Nate Skeen | Nominated | |
| Annie Awards | February 25, 2023 | Outstanding Achievement for Editorial in a Feature Production | Tony Greenberg, Katie Bishop, Chloe Kloezeman, Axel Geddes, Tim Fox | Nominated | |
| Art Directors Guild Awards | February 18, 2023 | Excellence in Production Design for an Animated Film | Tim Evatt | Nominated | |
| Black Reel Awards | February 6, 2023 | Outstanding Voice Performance | Keke Palmer | Nominated | |
| Casting Society of America | March 9, 2023 | Outstanding Achievement in Casting - Animation Feature | Natalie Lyon, Kevin Reher, Kate Hansen-Birnbaum | Nominated | |
| International Film Music Critics Association Awards | February 23, 2023 | Best Original Score for an Animated Film | Michael Giacchino | Nominated | |
| Motion Picture Sound Editors | February 26, 2023 | Outstanding Achievement in Sound Editing – Sound Effects, Foley, Dialogue and ADR for Animated Feature Film | Coya Elliott (supervising sound editor); Ren Klyce (sound designer); Kimberly Patrick, Jonathon Stevens, Benjamin A. Burtt (sound effects editor); Cheryl Nardi (dialogue editor); James Spencer, Dee Selby (foley editors); Shelley Roden, John Roesch (foley artists) | Nominated | |
| NAACP Image Awards | February 25, 2023 | Outstanding Character Voice Performance – Motion Picture | Keke Palmer | Won | |
| Nickelodeon Kids' Choice Awards | March 4, 2023 | Favorite Animated Movie | Lightyear | Nominated | |
| Nickelodeon Kids' Choice Awards | March 4, 2023 | Favorite Voice from an Animated Movie (Male) | Chris Evans | Nominated | |
| Nickelodeon Kids' Choice Awards | March 4, 2023 | Favorite Voice from an Animated Movie (Female) | Keke Palmer | Nominated | |
| Saturn Awards | October 25, 2022 | Best Animated Film | Lightyear | Nominated | |
| Visual Effects Society Awards | February 15, 2023 | Outstanding Created Environment in an Animated Feature | T'Kani Prime Forest – Lenora Acidera, Amy Allen, Alyssa Minko, Jose L. Ramos Serrano | Nominated | |
| Visual Effects Society Awards | February 15, 2023 | Outstanding Effects Simulations in an Animated Feature | Alexis Angelidis, Chris Chapman, Jung-Hyun Kim, Keith Klohn | Nominated | |

=== Elemental ===
is a 2023 American animated romantic comedy-drama film produced by Walt Disney Pictures and Pixar Animation Studios and distributed by Walt Disney Studios Motion Pictures. Directed by Peter Sohn and produced by Denise Ream, it was written by Sohn, John Hoberg, Kat Likkel, and Brenda Hsueh.

Accolades received by Elemental
| Award | Date of ceremony | Category | Recipient(s) | Result | Ref. |
|---|---|---|---|---|---|
| Hollywood Music in Media Awards | November 15, 2023 | Best Original Score — Animated Film | Thomas Newman | Nominated | |
| Hollywood Music in Media Awards | November 15, 2023 | Best Original Song — Animated Film | "Steal The Show" — Lauv, Michael Matosic, and Thomas Newman | Nominated | |
| Hollywood Professional Association Awards | November 28, 2023 | Outstanding Color Grading — Animated Theatrical Feature | Susan Brunig | Nominated | |
| Washington D.C. Area Film Critics Association Awards | December 10, 2023 | Best Animated Feature | Elemental | Nominated | |
| St. Louis Film Critics Association Awards | December 17, 2023 | Best Animated Film | Elemental | Nominated | |
| Women Film Critics Circle Awards | December 18, 2023 | Best Animated Female | Leah Lewis | 2nd Runner-up (Note: Shared with Chloë Grace Moretz for Nimona (2023)) | |
| Alliance of Women Film Journalists | January 3, 2024 | Best Animated Female | Leah Lewis | Nominated | |
| Georgia Film Critics Association Awards | January 5, 2024 | Best Animated Film | Elemental | Nominated | |
| Astra Film and Creative Arts Awards | January 6, 2024 | Best Animated Feature | Elemental | Nominated | |
| Astra Film and Creative Arts Awards | January 6, 2024 | Best Score | Thomas Newman | Nominated | |
| Golden Globe Awards | January 7, 2024 | Best Animated Feature Film | Elemental | Nominated | |
| San Francisco Bay Area Film Critics Circle Awards | January 9, 2024 | Best Animated Feature | Elemental | Nominated | |
| Austin Film Critics Association Awards | January 10, 2024 | Best Animated Film | Elemental | Nominated | |
| Critics' Choice Movie Awards | January 14, 2024 | Best Animated Feature | Elemental | Nominated | |
| ADG Excellence in Production Design Awards | February 10, 2024 | Excellence in Production Design for an Animated Film | Don Shank | Nominated | |
| Annie Awards | February 17, 2024 | Outstanding Achievement for Animated Effects in an Animated Production | Chris Chapman, Tim Speltz, Krzysztof Rost, Amit Baadkar, Ravindra Dwivedi | Nominated | |
| Annie Awards | February 17, 2024 | Outstanding Achievement for Character Animation in an Animated Feature Production | Jessica Torres | Nominated | |
| Annie Awards | February 17, 2024 | Outstanding Achievement for Character Design in an Animated Feature Production | Maria Yi | Nominated | |
| Annie Awards | February 17, 2024 | Outstanding Achievement for Music in an Animated Feature Production | Thomas Newman, Lauv | Nominated | |
| Annie Awards | February 17, 2024 | Outstanding Achievement for Production Design in an Animated Feature Production | Don Shank, Maria Yi, Dan Holland, Jennifer Chang, Laura Meyer | Nominated | |
| Annie Awards | February 17, 2024 | Outstanding Achievement for Editorial in an Animated Feature Production | Stephen Schaffer, Amera Rizk, Gregory Snyder, Jen Jew, and Kevin Rose-Williams | Nominated | |
| Satellite Awards | February 18, 2024 | Best Animated or Mixed Media Feature | Elemental | Nominated | |
| Visual Effects Society Awards | February 21, 2024 | Outstanding Visual Effects in an Animated Feature | Peter Sohn, Denise Ream, Sanjay Bakshi, Stephen Marshall | Nominated | |
| Visual Effects Society Awards | February 21, 2024 | Outstanding Animated Character in an Animated Feature | Gwendelyn Enderoglu, Jared Fong, Jonathan Hoffman, Patrick Witting (for Ember) | Nominated | |
| Visual Effects Society Awards | February 21, 2024 | Outstanding Animated Character in an Animated Feature | Max Gilbert, Jacob Kuenzel, Dave Strick, Benjamin Su (for Wade) | Nominated | |
| Visual Effects Society Awards | February 21, 2024 | Outstanding Created Environment in an Animated Feature | Chris Bernardi, Brandon Montell, David Shavers, Ting Zhang (for Element City) | Nominated | |
| Visual Effects Society Awards | February 21, 2024 | Outstanding Effects Simulations in an Animated Feature | Kristopher Campbell, Greg Gladstone, Jon Reisch, Kylie Wijsmuller | Nominated | |
| Visual Effects Society Awards | February 21, 2024 | Emerging Technology Award | Vinicius C. Azevedo, Byungsoo Kim, Raphael Ortiz, Paul Kanyuk (for Volumetric Neural Style Transfer) | Nominated | |
| British Academy Film Awards | February 18, 2024 | Best Animated Film | Elemental | Nominated | |
| Saturn Awards | February 4, 2024 | Best Animated Film | Elemental | Nominated | |
| Producers Guild of America Awards | February 25, 2024 | Outstanding Producer of Animated Theatrical Motion Pictures | Elemental | Nominated | |
| Cinema Audio Society Awards | March 2, 2024 | Outstanding Achievement in Sound Mixing for Motion Picture – Animated | Vince Caro, Paul McGrath, Stephen Urata, Ren Klyce, Thomas Vicari, Scott Curtis | Nominated | |
| Academy Awards | March 10, 2024 | Best Animated Feature | Peter Sohn and Denise Ream | Nominated | |
| Nickelodeon Kids' Choice Awards | July 13, 2024 | Favorite Animated Movie | Elemental | Nominated | |

=== Inside Out 2 ===
is a 2024 American animated coming-of-age film produced by Walt Disney Pictures and Pixar Animation Studios and distributed by Walt Disney Studios Motion Pictures. Directed by Kelsey Mann and produced by Mark Nielsen, it was written by Mann, Meg LeFauve, and Dave Holstein. It became breaking multiple box-office records which grossed over $1.699 billion worldwide, becoming the highest-grossing animated film of all time.

At the 97th Academy Awards, Inside Out 2 received nominations for Best Animated Feature. The film is also nominated for BAFTA Award for Best Animated Film, Critics' Choice Movie Award for Best Animated Feature, and Golden Globe Award for Best Animated Feature Film. At the 52nd Annie Awards, the movie received seven nominations, including Best Animated Feature.

=== Elio ===
is a 2025 American animated science fiction adventure film produced by Pixar Animation Studios for Walt Disney Pictures. Directed by Madeline Sharafian, Domee Shi, and Adrian Molina, (Note: Molina left the project by 2024. Nonetheless, he still retains director credit alongside Sharafian and Shi.) and written by Julia Cho, Mark Hammer, and Mike Jones, from a story developed by Molina, Sharafian, Shi, and Cho, the film stars the voices of Yonas Kibreab, Zoe Saldaña, Remy Edgerly, Dylan Gilmer, Matthias Schweighöfer, Brandon Moon, Brad Garrett, and Jameela Jamil.

| Award | Date of ceremony | Category | Recipient | Result | Ref. |
|---|---|---|---|---|---|
| Washington D.C. Area Film Critics Association | December 7, 2025 | Best Animated Film | Elio | Nominated | |
| St. Louis Film Critics Association | December 14, 2025 | Best Animated Film | Elio | Nominated | |
| New York Film Critics Online | December 15, 2025 | Best Animation | Elio | Nominated | |
| San Diego Film Critics Society | December 15, 2025 | Best Animated Film | Elio | Nominated | |
| Austin Film Critics Association | December 18, 2025 | Best Animated Film | Elio | Nominated | |
| Georgia Film Critics Association | December 27, 2025 | Best Animated Film | Elio | Nominated | |
| Critics' Choice Awards | January 4, 2026 | Best Animated Feature | Elio | Nominated | |
| Golden Globes Awards | January 11, 2026 | Best Motion Picture – Animated | Elio | Nominated | |
| London Film Critics Circle Awards | February 1, 2026 | Animated Feature of the Year | Elio | Nominated | |
| Annie Awards | February 21, 2026 | Best Feature | Elio | Nominated | |
| Annie Awards | February 21, 2026 | Best FX – Feature | Ferdi Scheepers, Shaun Galinak, Alyssa Lee, Nate Skeen, and Gary Bruins | Nominated | |
| Annie Awards | February 21, 2026 | Best Character Animation – Feature | Jonah Sidhom | Nominated | |
| Annie Awards | February 21, 2026 | Best Character Design – Feature | Matt Nolte, Yingzong Xin, James Woods, Kaleb Rice, Bob Pauley | Nominated | |
| Annie Awards | February 21, 2026 | Best Music – Feature | Rob Simonsen | Nominated | |
| Annie Awards | February 21, 2026 | Best Production Design – Feature | Harley Jessup, Ernesto Nemesio, Maria Lee, Kristian Norelius, Kyle Jones | Nominated | |
| Annie Awards | February 21, 2026 | Best Storyboarding – Feature | Tony Rosenast | Nominated | |
| Annie Awards | February 21, 2026 | Best Voice Acting – Feature | Remy Edgerly | Nominated | |
| Annie Awards | February 21, 2026 | Best Writing – Feature | Julia Cho, Mark Hammer, Mike Jones | Nominated | |
| Annie Awards | February 21, 2026 | Best Editorial – Feature | Anna Wolitzky, Steve Bloom, Noah Newman, Greg Snyder, Ben Morris | Nominated | |
| Visual Effects Society Awards | February 25, 2026 | Outstanding Animation in an Animated Feature | Claudia Chung Sanii, Mary Alice Drumm, Harley Jessup, Dave Quirus | Nominated | |
| Visual Effects Society Awards | February 25, 2026 | Outstanding Character in an Animated Feature | Catherine Luo, Anna-Christine Lykkegaard, Ferdi Scheepers, Julian Teo (for "Ooooo the Liquid Supercomputer") | Nominated | |
| Visual Effects Society Awards | February 25, 2026 | Outstanding Character in an Animated Feature | Marco Burbano, Edgar Rodriguez, Ben Rush, Patrick Yu Wang (for "Glordon") | Nominated | |
| Visual Effects Society Awards | February 25, 2026 | Outstanding Environment in an Animated Feature | Steve Arguello, Christopher M. Burrows, Andy Lin, Laura Murphy (for "The Communiverse") | Nominated | |
| Visual Effects Society Awards | February 25, 2026 | Emerging Technology Award | Andrew Butts, Trent Crow, Anna-Christine Lykkegaard, Catherine Luo (For "Real-Time High Fidelity Animation System Using Signed Distance Functions") | Nominated | |
| Art Directors Guild Awards | February 28, 2026 | Best Animated Feature Film | Elio – Harley Jessup | Nominated | |
| Producers Guild Awards | February 28, 2026 | Award for Outstanding Producer of Animated Theatrical Motion Pictures | Elio – Mary Alice Drumm | Nominated | |
| Motion Picture Sound Editors | March 8, 2026 | Outstanding Achievement in Sound Editing – Feature Animation | Disney Pixar | Nominated | |
| Saturn Awards | March 8, 2026 | Best Animated Film | Elio | Nominated | |
| Academy Awards | March 15, 2026 | Best Animated Feature | Elio | Nominated | |
| Satellite Awards | March 10, 2026 | Best Motion Picture – Animated or Mixed Media | Elio | Won | |

=== Hoppers ===
is a 2026 American animated science fiction comedy film[c] directed by Daniel Chong from a screenplay by Jesse Andrews and a story by Chong and Andrews. Produced by Pixar Animation Studios for Walt Disney Pictures, the film stars the voices of Piper Curda, Bobby Moynihan, Jon Hamm, Kathy Najimy and Dave Franco.

Accolades received by Hoppers
| Award | Date of ceremony | Category | Recipient(s) | Result | Ref. |
|---|---|---|---|---|---|
| Gold House | May 9, 2026 | Gold100 List | Hoppers(Director and Lead Voice Actor, Daniel Chong & Piper Curda) | Included | |
| Golden Trailer Awards | May 28, 2026 | Best Animation/Family | "Party" (Walt Disney Studios and X/AV) | Nominated | |
| Golden Trailer Awards | May 28, 2026 | Best Animation/Family TV Spot | TV: "Crazy (Super Bowl)" (Walt Disney Studios and X/AV) | Won | |
| Golden Trailer Awards | May 28, 2026 | Best Animation TrailerByte for a Feature Film | Digital Spots (The Walt Disney Company and Tiny Hero) | Won | |
| Humanitas Prize | September 9, 2026 | Family Feature | Jesse Andrews and Daniel Chong | Nominated | |

=== Toy Story 5 ===
is a 2026 American animated comedy-drama film directed by Andrew Stanton written by Stanton and Kenna Harris, and produced by Pixar Animation Studios for Walt Disney Pictures. It features the voices of Tom Hanks, Tim Allen and Joan Cusack among those reprising their roles, joined by Conan O'Brien, Scarlett Spears, Greta Lee, Shelby Rabara, Mykal-Michelle Harris and Craig Robinson.

Accolades received by Toy Story 5
| Award | Date of ceremony | Category | Recipient(s) | Result | Ref. |
|---|---|---|---|---|---|
| Astra Midseason Movie Awards | June 30, 2026 | Best Picture | Toy Story 5 | Nominated | |
| Astra Midseason Movie Awards | June 30, 2026 | Best Screenplay | Andrew Stanton and Kenna Harris | Nominated | |
| Country Music Association Awards | November 18, 2026 | Single of the Year | "I Knew It, I Knew You" – Taylor Swift (performer and producer); Jack Antonoff (producer); Laura Sisk (mix engineer) | Pending | |
| Digital Spy Reader Awards | December 28, 2025 | Most Anticipated Movie of 2026 | Toy Story 5 | Runner-up | |
| Golden Trailer Awards | May 28, 2026 | Best Teaser | "Unpacking" (Walt Disney Studios and MOCEAN) | Nominated | |
| Kids' Choice Awards | November 14, 2026 | Favorite Animated Movie | Toy Story 5 | Pending | |
| Kids' Choice Awards | November 14, 2026 | Favorite Female Animated Voice from a Movie | Joan Cusack | Pending | |
| Kids' Choice Awards | November 14, 2026 | Favorite Male Animated Voice from a Movie | Tim Allen | Pending | |
| Kids' Choice Awards | November 14, 2026 | Favorite Male Animated Voice from a Movie | Tom Hanks | Pending | |
| Kids' Choice Awards | November 14, 2026 | Favorite On-Screen Duo or Trio | Joan Cusack, Tim Allen, and Tom Hanks | Pending | |
| Kids' Choice Awards | November 14, 2026 | Favorite Song from a Movie | "I Knew It, I Knew You" – Taylor Swift | Pending | |
| MTV Video Music Awards | September 27, 2026 | Song of Summer | "I Knew It, I Knew You" – Taylor Swift | Nominated | |
| Weibo Music Awards | September 23, 2026 | Song of the Year – Foreign | "I Knew It, I Knew You" – Taylor Swift | Nominated | |

== See also ==
- List of animated feature films nominated for Academy Awards
- List of Pixar awards and nominations
- Pixar Animation Studios
