= List of accolades received by Turning Red =

Turning Red accolades
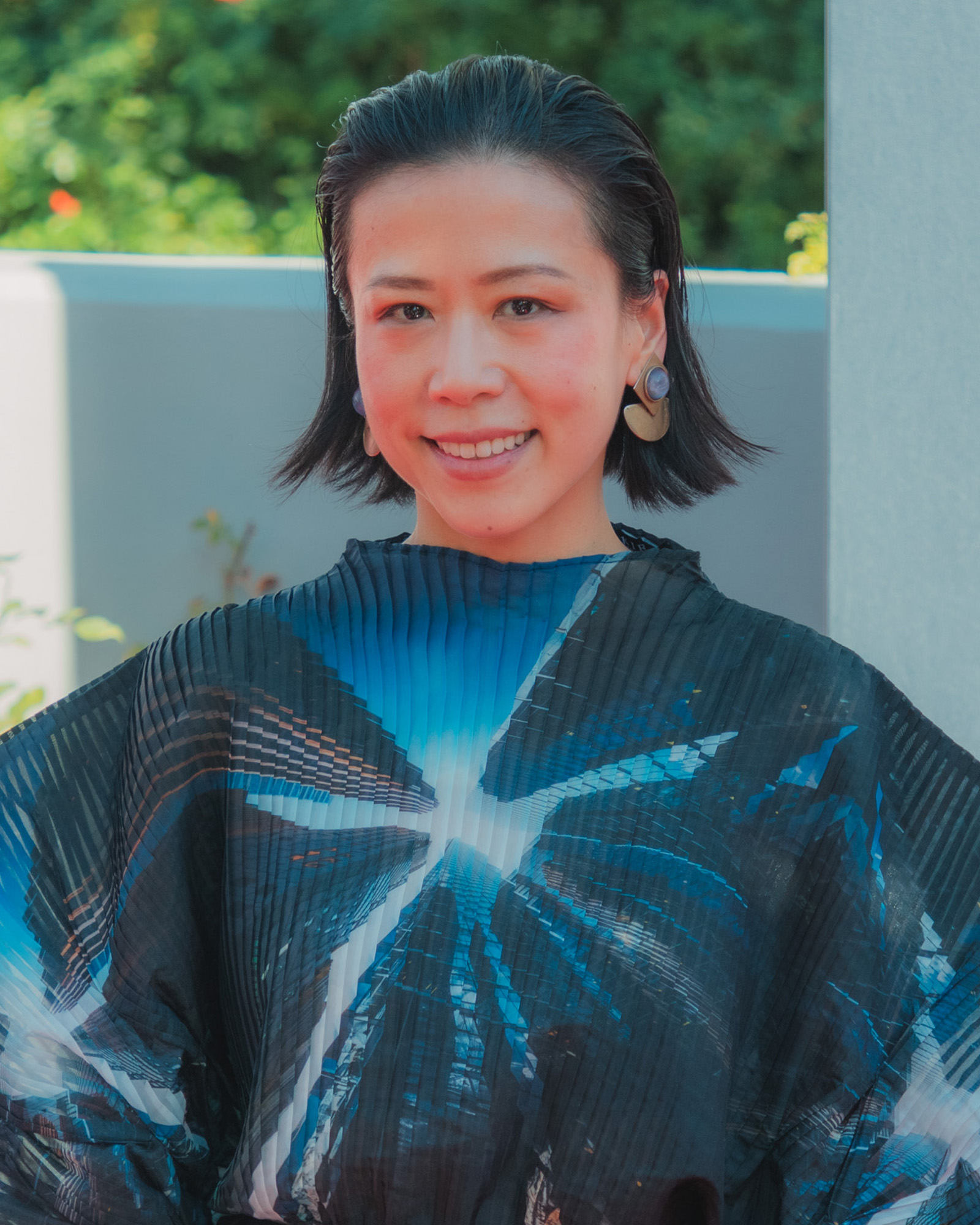
- Domee Shi received nine nominations for her direction.
Awards and nominations
Award	Wins	Nominations
Academy Awards	0	1
Alliance of Women Film Journalists Awards	0	4
American Cinema Editors Awards	0	1
Annie Awards	0	7
Art Directors Guild Awards	0	1
Artios Awards	0	2
Austin Film Critics Association Awards	0	2
BMI Film & TV Awards	1	1
Boston Society of Film Critics Awards	1	1
British Academy Film Awards	0	1
Chicago Film Critics Association Awards	0	1
Cinema Audio Society Awards	0	1
Critics' Choice Movie Awards	0	1
Dorian Awards	0	1
Florida Film Critics Circle Awards	1	1
Golden Globe Awards	0	1
Golden Reel Awards	0	1
Golden Trailer Awards	1	2
Grammy Awards	0	1
Guild of Music Supervisors Awards	0	1
Hollywood Critics Association Awards	0	3
Hollywood Critics Association Creative Arts Awards	0	1
Hollywood Critics Association Midseason Awards	0	1
Hollywood Music in Media Awards	0	3
Houston Film Critics Society Awards	0	1
Hugo Awards	0	1
MTV Movie & TV Awards	0	1
NAACP Image Awards	0	1
Nickelodeon Kids' Choice Awards	0	2
Online Film Critics Society Awards	0	2
Producers Guild of America Awards	0	1
San Diego Film Critics Society Awards	1	1
San Francisco Bay Area Film Critics Circle Awards	0	1
Satellite Awards	0	1
Seattle Film Critics Society Awards	0	1
St. Louis Gateway Film Critics Association Awards	0	1
Toronto Film Critics Association Awards	2	2
Visual Effects Society Awards	0	3
Washington D.C. Area Film Critics Association Awards	0	3

Totals (Note: Certain award groups do not simply award one winner. They acknowledge several different recipients, have runners-up, and have third place. Since this is a specific recognition and is different from losing an award, runner-up mentions are considered wins in this award tally. For simplification and to avoid errors, each award in this list has been presumed to have had a prior nomination.)
- Wins: 7
- Nominations: 62

Turning Red is a 2022 American animated fantasy comedy film directed by Domee Shi. Set in Toronto, Ontario, in 2002, the film follows Meilin "Mei" Lee (Rosalie Chiang), a 13-year-old Chinese-Canadian student who transforms into a giant red panda when she experiences any strong emotion, due to a hereditary curse. Turning Red also stars the voices of Sandra Oh, Ava Morse, Hyein Park, Maitreyi Ramakrishnan, Orion Lee, Wai Ching Ho, Tristan Allerick Chen, and James Hong.

Turning Red debuted in London on February 21, 2022, and was scheduled to be theatrically released on March 11. However, the film was shifted to a direct-to-streaming release on Disney+ due to the COVID-19 pandemic, although it was still released in theaters in countries without the streaming service. Produced on a budget of $175 million, Turning Red grossed $20.1 million. On the review aggregator website Rotten Tomatoes, the film holds an approval rating of 95% based on 289 reviews.

Turning Red garnered awards and nominations in various categories. It received nominations for Best Animated Film from multiple award organizations, including the Academy Awards, the Annie Awards, the British Academy Film Awards, the Critics' Choice Movie Awards, and the Golden Globe Awards. The film won the same category at the Boston Society of Film Critics Awards, the Florida Film Critics Circle Awards, and the Toronto Film Critics Association Awards.

== Accolades ==
Accolades received by Turning Red
Award	Date of ceremony	Category	Recipient(s)	Result	Ref.
Academy Awards	March 12, 2023	Best Animated Feature Film	Domee Shi and Lindsey Collins	Nominated	
Alliance of Women Film Journalists Awards	January 5, 2023	Best Animated Film	Turning Red	Nominated	
Alliance of Women Film Journalists Awards	January 5, 2023	Best Woman Screenwriter	Domee Shi	Nominated	
Alliance of Women Film Journalists Awards	January 5, 2023	Best Animated Female	Rosalie Chiang	Nominated	
Alliance of Women Film Journalists Awards	January 5, 2023	Best Animated Female	Sandra Oh	Nominated	
American Cinema Editors Awards	March 5, 2023	Best Edited Animated Feature Film	Nicholas C. Smith and Steve Bloom	Nominated	
Annie Awards	February 25, 2023	Best Animated Feature	Turning Red	Nominated	
Annie Awards	February 25, 2023	Outstanding Achievement for Character Animation in an Animated Feature Production	Teresa Falcone	Nominated	
Annie Awards	February 25, 2023	Outstanding Achievement for Character Animation in an Animated Feature Production	Eric Anderson	Nominated	
Annie Awards	February 25, 2023	Outstanding Achievement for Directing in an Animated Feature Production	Domee Shi	Nominated	
Annie Awards	February 25, 2023	Outstanding Achievement for Editorial in an Animated Feature Production	Nicholas Smith, Steve Bloom, David Suther, Anna Wolitzky, and Christopher Zuber	Nominated	
Annie Awards	February 25, 2023	Outstanding Achievement for Music in an Animated Feature Production	Ludwig Göransson, Billie Eilish, and Finneas O'Connell	Nominated	
Annie Awards	February 25, 2023	Outstanding Achievement for Writing in an Animated Feature Production	Domee Shi and Julia Cho	Nominated	
Art Directors Guild Awards	February 18, 2023	Excellence in Production Design for an Animated Film	Rona Liu	Nominated	
Artios Awards	March 9, 2023	Animation	Natalie Lyon, Kevin Reher, and Kate Hansen-Birnbaum	Nominated	
Artios Awards	March 9, 2023	Film, Non-Theatrical Release	Kevin Reher, Natalie Lyon, and Kate Hansen-Birnbaum	Nominated	
Austin Film Critics Association Awards	January 10, 2023	Best Animated Film	Turning Red	Nominated	
Austin Film Critics Association Awards	January 10, 2023	Best First Film	Domee Shi	Nominated	
BMI Film & TV Awards	May 10, 2023	BMI Streaming Film Awards	Ludwig Göransson (Note: Also for Black Panther: Wakanda Forever (2022) and the television series The Book of Boba Fett)	Won	
Boston Society of Film Critics Awards	December 11, 2022	Best Animated Film	Turning Red	Won	
British Academy Film Awards	February 19, 2023	Best Animated Film	Domee Shi and Lindsey Collins	Nominated	
Chicago Film Critics Association Awards	December 14, 2022	Best Animated Film	Turning Red	Nominated	
Cinema Audio Society Awards	March 4, 2023	Outstanding Achievement in Sound Mixing for a Motion Picture – Animated	Vince Caro, Stephen Urata, Ren Klyce, Chris Fogel, and Scott Curtis	Nominated	
Critics' Choice Movie Awards	January 15, 2023	Best Animated Feature	Turning Red	Nominated	
Dorian Awards	February 23, 2023	Animated Film of the Year	Turning Red	Nominated	
Florida Film Critics Circle Awards	December 22, 2022	Best Animated Film	Turning Red	Won	
Georgia Film Critics Association Awards	January 13, 2023	Best Animated Film	Turning Red	Nominated	
Golden Globe Awards	January 10, 2023	Best Animated Feature Film	Turning Red	Nominated	
Golden Trailer Awards	October 6, 2022	Best Animation TrailerByte for a Feature Film	"Boots and Cats" (ZEALOT)	Nominated	
Golden Trailer Awards	June 29, 2023	Best Animation TrailerByte for a Feature Film	"Boots and Cats" (ZEALOT)	Won	
Grammy Awards	February 5, 2023	Best Song Written for Visual Media	Billie Eilish and Finneas O'Connell for "Nobody Like U"	Nominated	
Guild of Music Supervisors Awards	March 5, 2023	Best Music Supervision for Films Budgeted Over $25 Million	Tom MacDougall	Nominated	
Hollywood Critics Association Awards	February 24, 2023	Best Animated Film	Turning Red	Nominated	
Hollywood Critics Association Awards	February 24, 2023	Best First Feature	Domee Shi	Nominated	
Hollywood Critics Association Awards	February 24, 2023	Best Voice or Motion-Capture Performance	Rosalie Chiang	Nominated	
Hollywood Critics Association Creative Arts Awards	February 24, 2023	Best Song	"Nobody Like U"	Nominated	
Hollywood Critics Association Midseason Film Awards	July 1, 2022	Best Picture	Turning Red	Nominated	
Hollywood Music in Media Awards	November 16, 2022	Best Original Score in an Animated Film	Finneas O'Connell and Ludwig Göransson	Nominated	
Hollywood Music in Media Awards	November 16, 2022	Best Original Song in an Animated Film	Billie Eilish and Finneas O'Connell for "Nobody Like U"	Nominated	
Hollywood Music in Media Awards	November 16, 2022	Best Soundtrack Album	Finneas O'Connell, Ludwig Göransson, and 4*Town for Turning Red	Nominated	
Houston Film Critics Society Awards	February 18, 2023	Best Animated Feature	Turning Red	Nominated	
Hugo Awards	October 18–22, 2023	Best Dramatic Presentation, Long Form	Julia Cho and Domee Shi	Nominated	
MTV Movie & TV Awards	June 5, 2022	Best Musical Moment	4*Town for "Nobody Like U"	Nominated	
NAACP Image Awards	February 25, 2023	Outstanding Animated Motion Picture	Turning Red	Nominated	
Nickelodeon Kids' Choice Awards	March 4, 2023	Favorite Animated Movie	Turning Red	Nominated	
Nickelodeon Kids' Choice Awards	March 4, 2023	Favorite Voice from an Animated Movie (Female)	Sandra Oh	Nominated	
Online Film Critics Society Awards	January 23, 2023	Best Animated Feature	Turning Red	Nominated	
Online Film Critics Society Awards	January 23, 2023	Best Debut Feature	Domee Shi	Nominated	
Producers Guild of America Awards	February 25, 2023	Outstanding Producer of Animated Theatrical Motion Pictures	Lindsey Collins	Nominated	
San Diego Film Critics Society Awards	January 6, 2023	Best Animated Film	Turning Red	Runner-up	
San Francisco Bay Area Film Critics Circle Awards	January 9, 2023	Best Animated Feature	Turning Red	Nominated	
Satellite Awards	March 3, 2023	Best Motion Picture – Animated or Mixed Media	Turning Red	Nominated	
Seattle Film Critics Society Awards	January 17, 2023	Best Animated Feature	Turning Red	Nominated	
St. Louis Gateway Film Critics Association Awards	December 18, 2022	Best Animated Feature	Turning Red	Nominated	
Toronto Film Critics Association Awards	January 8, 2023	Best Animated Film	Turning Red	Won	
Toronto Film Critics Association Awards	January 8, 2023	Best First Feature	Turning Red	Runner-up	
Visual Effects Society Awards	February 15, 2023	Outstanding Visual Effects in an Animated Feature	Domee Shi, Lindsey Collins, Danielle Feinberg, and Dave Hale	Nominated	
Visual Effects Society Awards	February 15, 2023	Outstanding Animated Character in an Animated Feature	Christopher Bolwyn, Ethan Dean, Bill Sheffler, and Kureha Yokoo for "Panda Mei"	Nominated	
Visual Effects Society Awards	February 15, 2023	Emerging Technology Award	Kurt Fleischer, Fernando de Goes, and Bill Sheffler for "Profile Mover and CurveNets"	Nominated	
Washington D.C. Area Film Critics Association Awards	December 12, 2022	Best Animated Feature	Turning Red	Nominated	
Washington D.C. Area Film Critics Association Awards	December 12, 2022	Best Voice Performance	Rosalie Chiang	Nominated	
Washington D.C. Area Film Critics Association Awards	December 12, 2022	Best Voice Performance	Sandra Oh	Nominated	
