= Washington D.C. Area Film Critics Association Awards 2022 =

21st Washington D.C. Area Film Critics Association Awards

21st WAFCA Awards
- Date: December 12, 2022

Highlights
- Best Film: Everything Everywhere All at Once
- Best Director: Daniel Kwan and Daniel Scheinert – Everything Everywhere All at Once
- Best Actor: Colin Farrell – The Banshees of Inisherin
- Best Actress: Cate Blanchett – Tár

The 21st Washington D.C. Area Film Critics Association Awards were announced on December 12, 2022. The nominations were announced on December 10, 2022.

Everything Everywhere All at Once and The Fabelmans led the nominations with eleven each, followed by The Banshees of Inisherin with eight.

== Winners and nominees ==
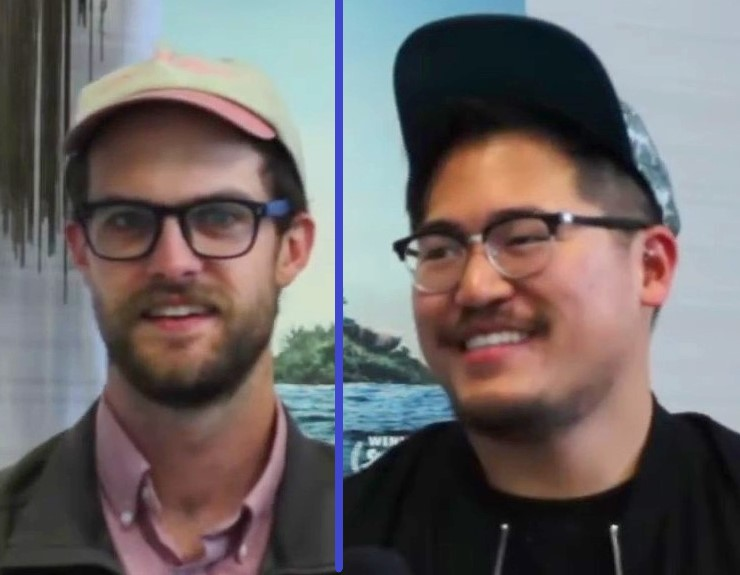
Daniel Scheinert and Daniel Kwan, Best Director and Best Original Screenplay winners

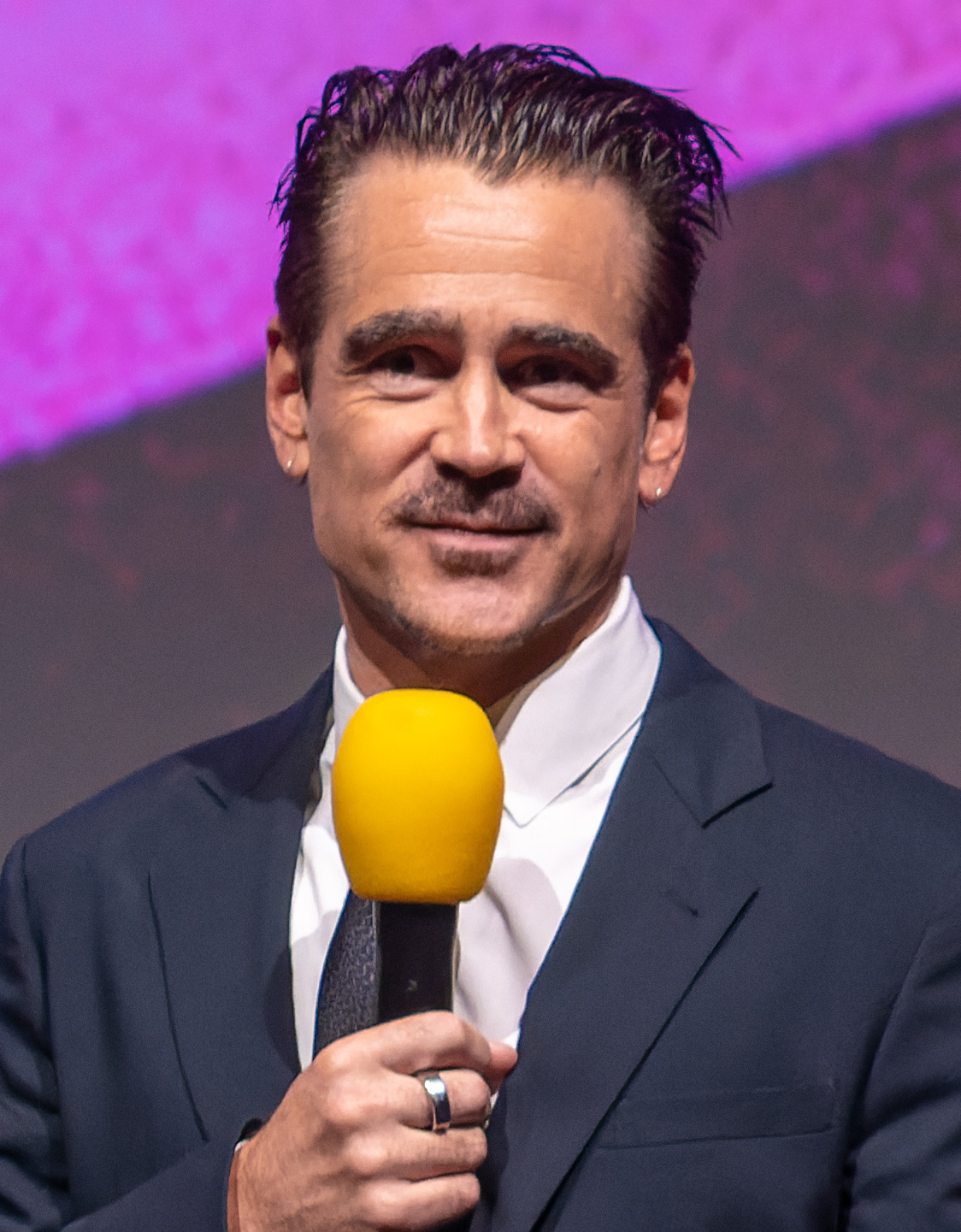
Colin Farrell, Best Actor winner

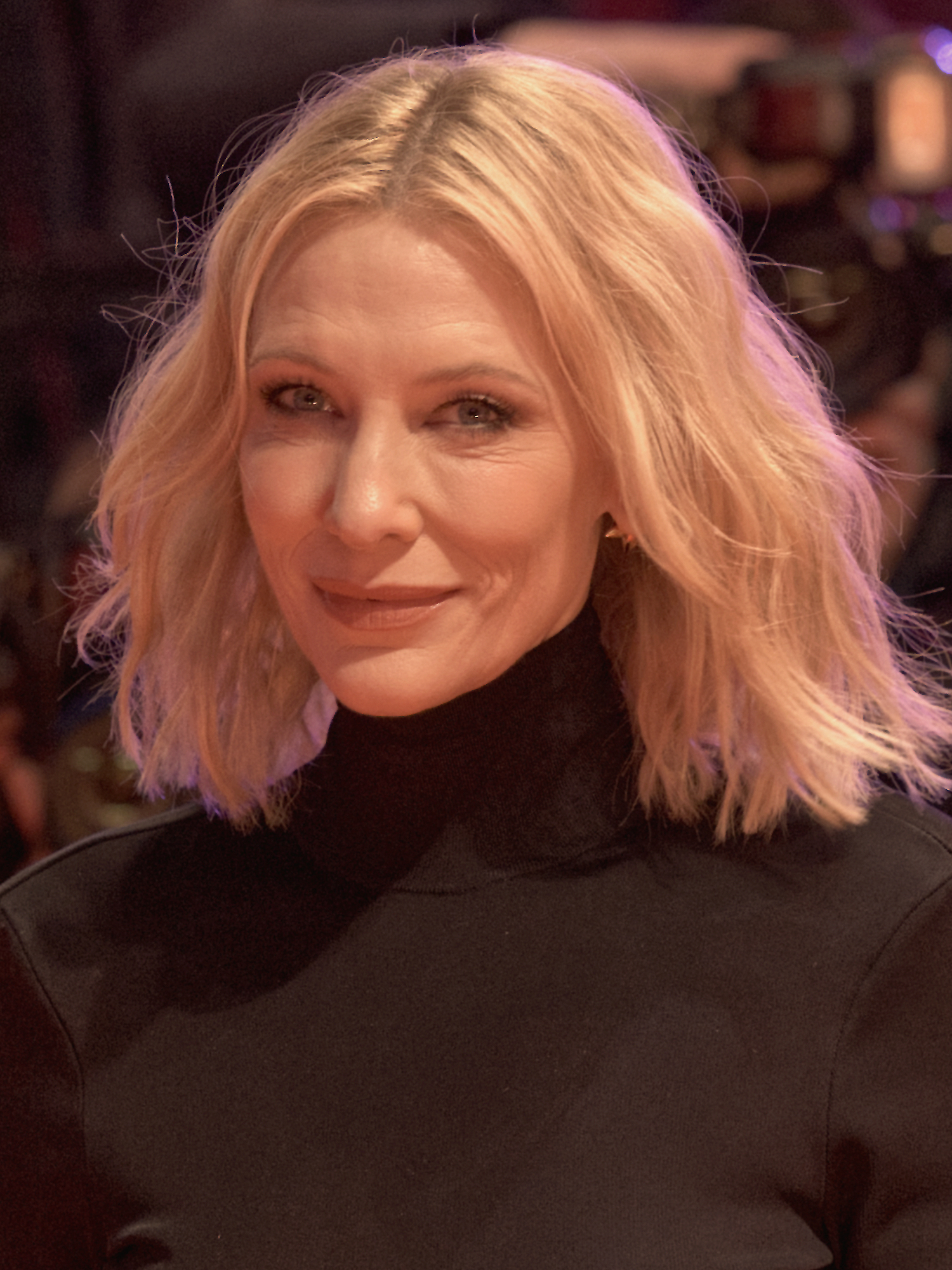
Cate Blanchett, Best Actress winner

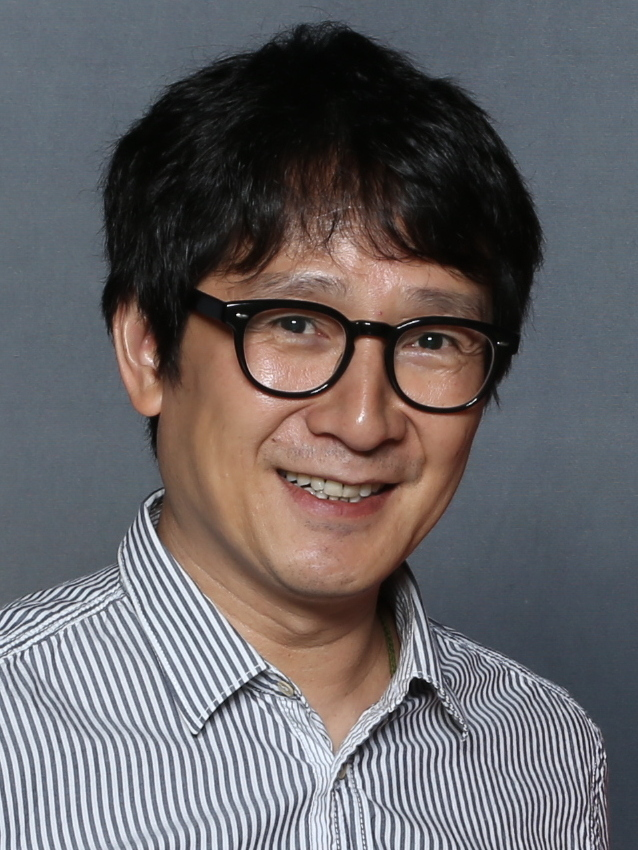
Ke Huy Quan, Best Supporting Actor winner

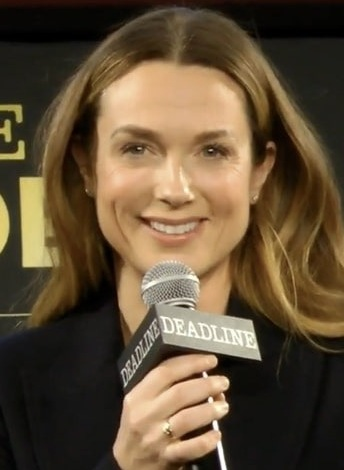
Kerry Condon, Best Supporting Actress winner

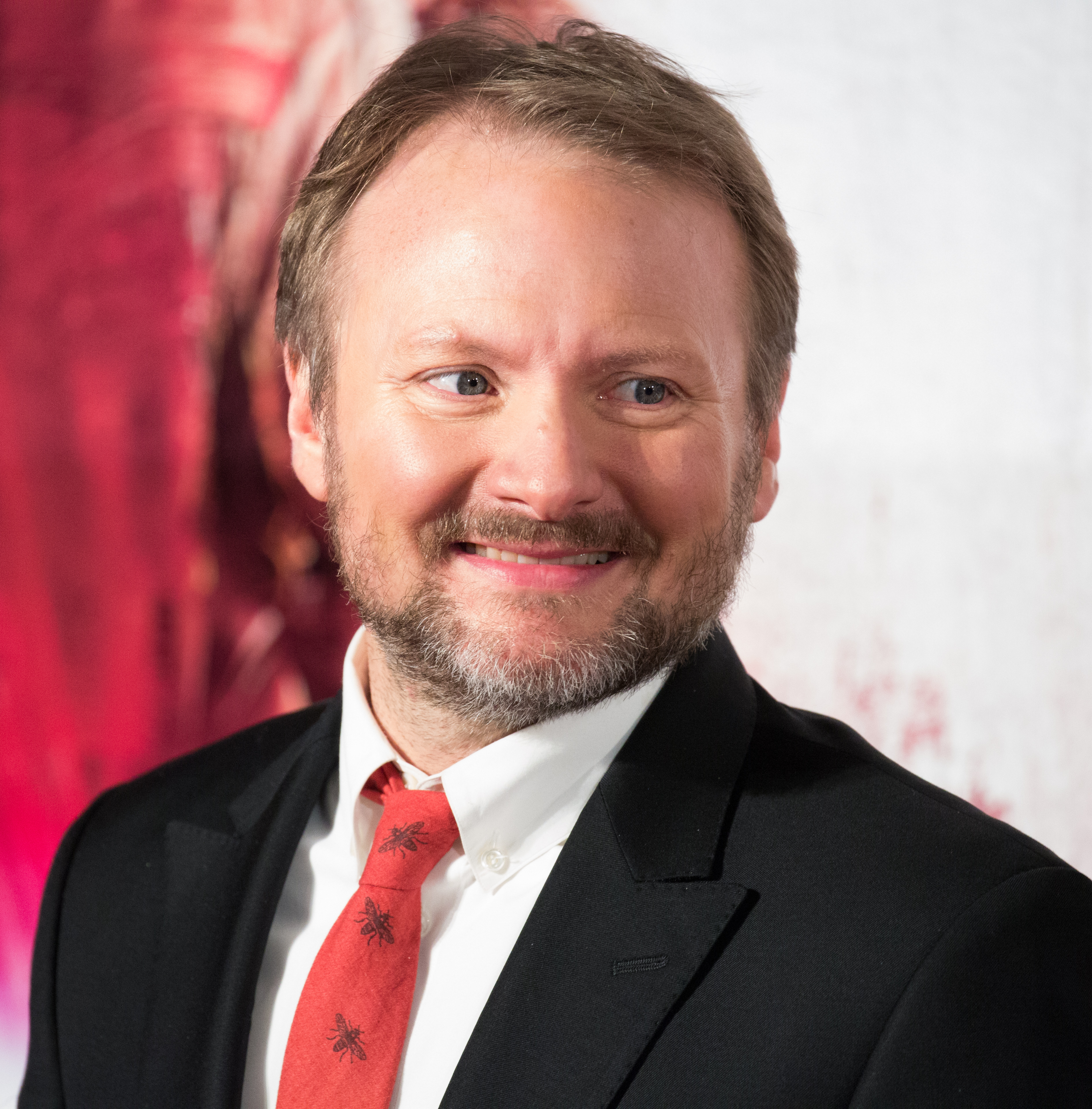
Rian Johnson, Best Adapted Screenplay winner

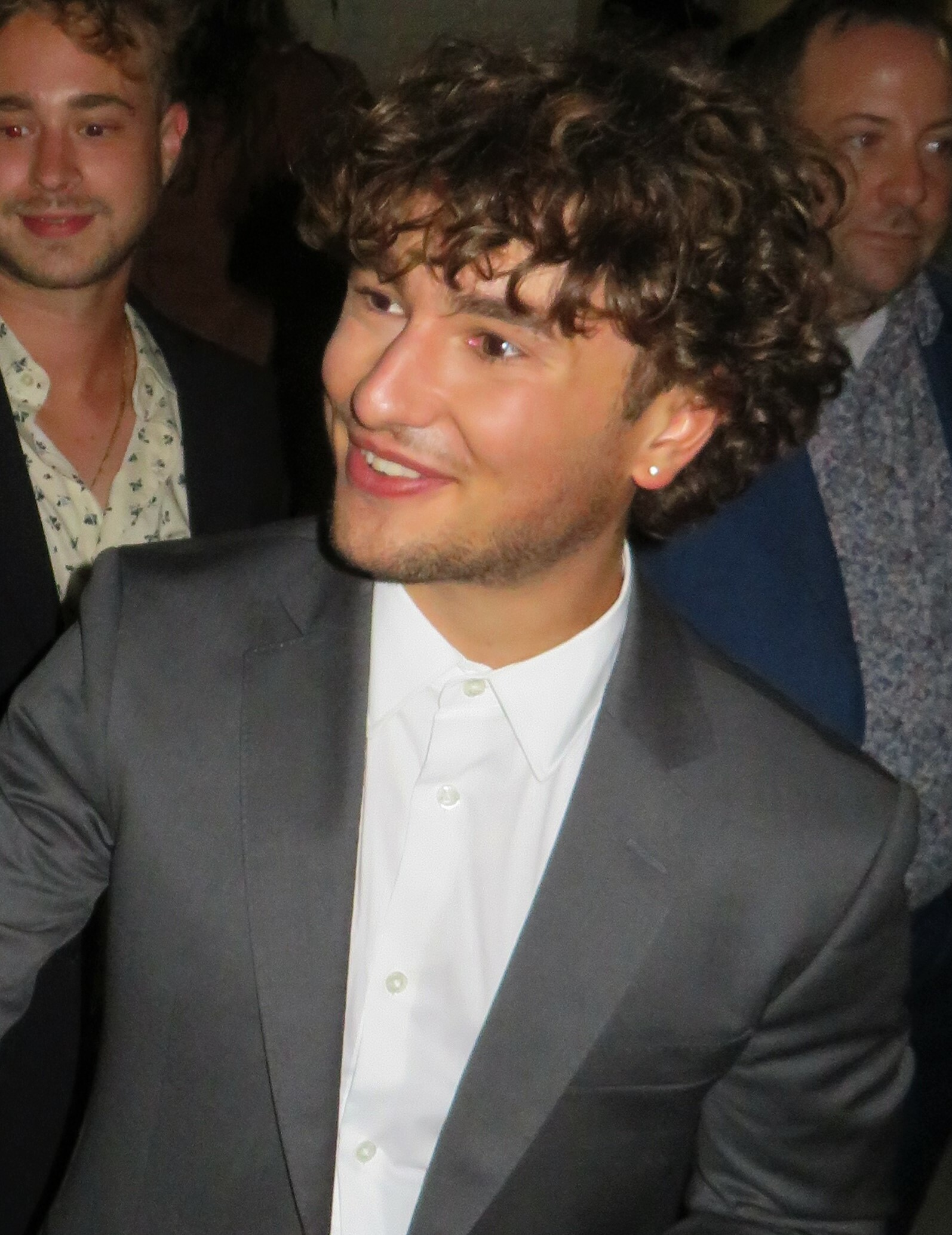
Gabriel LaBelle, Best Youth Performance winner

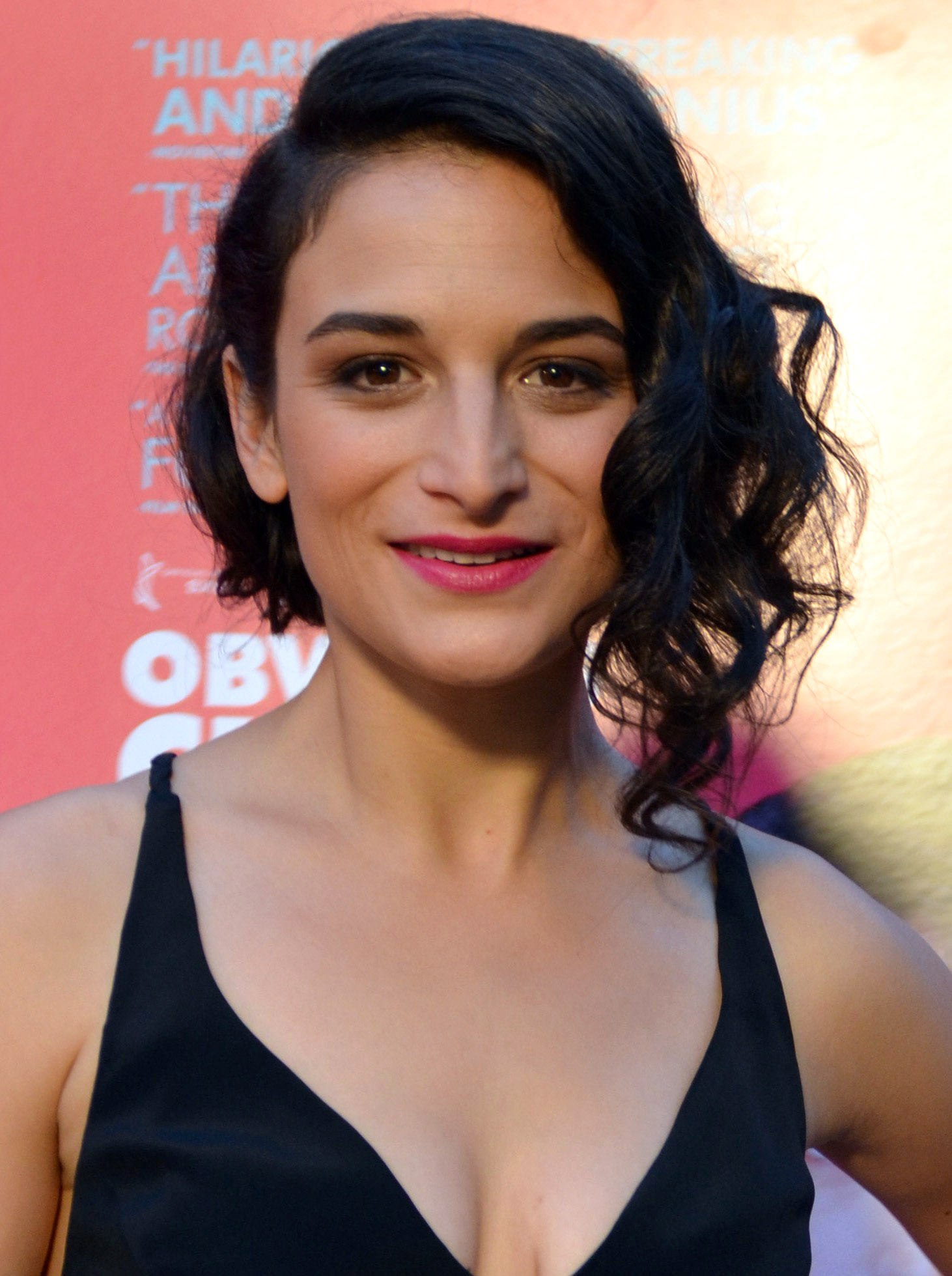
Jenny Slate, Best Voice Performance winner

Best Film	Best Director
Everything Everywhere All at Once: The Banshees of Inisherin; The Fabelmans; Tár; Top Gun: Maverick	Daniel Kwan and Daniel Scheinert – Everything Everywhere All at Once: Todd Field – Tár; Martin McDonagh – The Banshees of Inisherin; Sarah Polley – Women Talking; Steven Spielberg – The Fabelmans
Best Actor	Best Actress
Colin Farrell – The Banshees of Inisherin as Pádraic Súilleabháin: Austin Butler – Elvis as Elvis Presley; Tom Cruise – Top Gun: Maverick as Captain Pete "Maverick" Mitchell; Brendan Fraser – The Whale as Charlie; Paul Mescal – Aftersun as Calum Paterson	Cate Blanchett – Tár as Lydia Tár: Viola Davis – The Woman King as General Nanisca; Danielle Deadwyler – Till as Mamie Till-Mobley; Michelle Williams – The Fabelmans as Mitzi Fabelman; Michelle Yeoh – Everything Everywhere All at Once as Evelyn Quan Wang
Best Supporting Actor	Best Supporting Actress
Ke Huy Quan – Everything Everywhere All at Once as Waymond Wang: Paul Dano – The Fabelmans as Burt Fabelman; Brendan Gleeson – The Banshees of Inisherin as Colm Doherty; Barry Keoghan – The Banshees of Inisherin as Dominic Kearney; Ben Whishaw – Women Talking as August	Kerry Condon – The Banshees of Inisherin as Siobhán Súilleabháin: Angela Bassett – Black Panther: Wakanda Forever as Queen Ramonda; Jamie Lee Curtis – Everything Everywhere All at Once as Deirdre Beaubeirdre; Stephanie Hsu – Everything Everywhere All at Once as Joy Wang / Jobu Tupaki; Janelle Monáe – Glass Onion: A Knives Out Mystery as Helen Brand / Cassandra "Andi" Brand
Best Original Screenplay	Best Adapted Screenplay
Everything Everywhere All at Once – Daniel Kwan and Daniel Scheinert: The Banshees of Inisherin – Martin McDonagh; The Fabelmans – Steven Spielberg and Tony Kushner; Nope – Jordan Peele; Tár – Todd Field	Glass Onion: A Knives Out Mystery – Rian Johnson: Guillermo del Toro's Pinocchio – Patrick McHale and Guillermo del Toro; She Said – Rebecca Lenkiewicz; The Whale – Samuel D. Hunter; Women Talking – Sarah Polley
Best Animated Feature	Best Documentary
Guillermo del Toro's Pinocchio: Apollo 10 1/2: A Space Age Childhood; Marcel the Shell with Shoes On; Turning Red; Wendell & Wild	Good Night Oppy: All That Breathes; All the Beauty and the Bloodshed; Descendant; Fire of Love
Best International/Foreign Language Film	Best Cinematography
Decision to Leave: All Quiet on the Western Front; Close; EO; RRR	Top Gun: Maverick – Claudio Miranda: Empire of Light – Roger Deakins; Everything Everywhere All at Once – Larkin Seiple; The Fabelmans – Janusz Kamiński; Nope – Hoyte van Hoytema
Best Editing	Best Original Score
Top Gun: Maverick – Eddie Hamilton: Elvis – Matt Villa and Jonathan Redmond; Everything Everywhere All at Once – Paul Rogers; The Fabelmans – Michael Kahn and Sarah Broshar; Tár – Monika Willi	The Batman – Michael Giacchino: The Fabelmans – John Williams; Guillermo del Toro's Pinocchio – Alexandre Desplat; Tár – Hildur Guðnadóttir; Women Talking – Hildur Guðnadóttir
Best Production Design	Best Acting Ensemble
Black Panther: Wakanda Forever – Hannah Beachler (production designer); Lisa Sessions Morgan (set decorator): Elvis – Catherine Martin and Karen Murphy (production designers); Bev Dunn (set decorator); Everything Everywhere All at Once – Jason Kisvarday (production designer); Kelsi Ephraim (set decorator); The Fabelmans – Rick Carter (production designer); Karen O'Hara (set decorator); Glass Onion: A Knives Out Mystery – Rick Heinrichs (production designer); Elli Griff (set decorator)	Glass Onion: A Knives Out Mystery: The Banshees of Inisherin; Everything Everywhere All at Once; The Fabelmans; Women Talking
Best Youth Performance	Best Voice Performance
Gabriel LaBelle – The Fabelmans as Sammy Fabelman: Frankie Corio – Aftersun as Sophie Paterson; Jalyn Hall – Till as Emmett Till; Banks Repeta – Armageddon Time as Paul Graff; Sadie Sink – The Whale as Ellie	Jenny Slate – Marcel the Shell with Shoes On as Marcel: Rosalie Chiang – Turning Red as Meilin "Mei" Lee; Gregory Mann – Guillermo del Toro's Pinocchio as Pinocchio; Ewan McGregor – Guillermo del Toro's Pinocchio as Sebastian J. Cricket; Sandra Oh – Turning Red as Ming Lee
Best Motion Capture Performance
Zoe Saldaña – Avatar: The Way of Water as Neytiri: Sigourney Weaver – Avatar: The Way of Water as Kiri; Sam Worthington – Avatar: The Way of Water as Jake Sully

== Multiple nominations and wins ==
The following films received multiple nominations:

Nominations	Film
11	Everything Everywhere All at Once
11	The Fabelmans
8	The Banshees of Inisherin
6	Tár
5	Guillermo del Toro's Pinocchio
5	Women Talking
4	Glass Onion: A Knives Out Mystery
4	Top Gun: Maverick
3	Avatar: The Way of Water
3	Elvis
3	Turning Red
3	The Whale
2	Aftersun
2	Black Panther: Wakanda Forever
2	Marcel the Shell with Shoes On
2	Nope
2	Till

The following films received multiple awards:

Wins	Film
4	Everything Everywhere All at Once
2	The Banshees of Inisherin
2	Glass Onion: A Knives Out Mystery
2	Top Gun: Maverick
