= Josh Levi (singer) =

American singer and actor (born 1998)

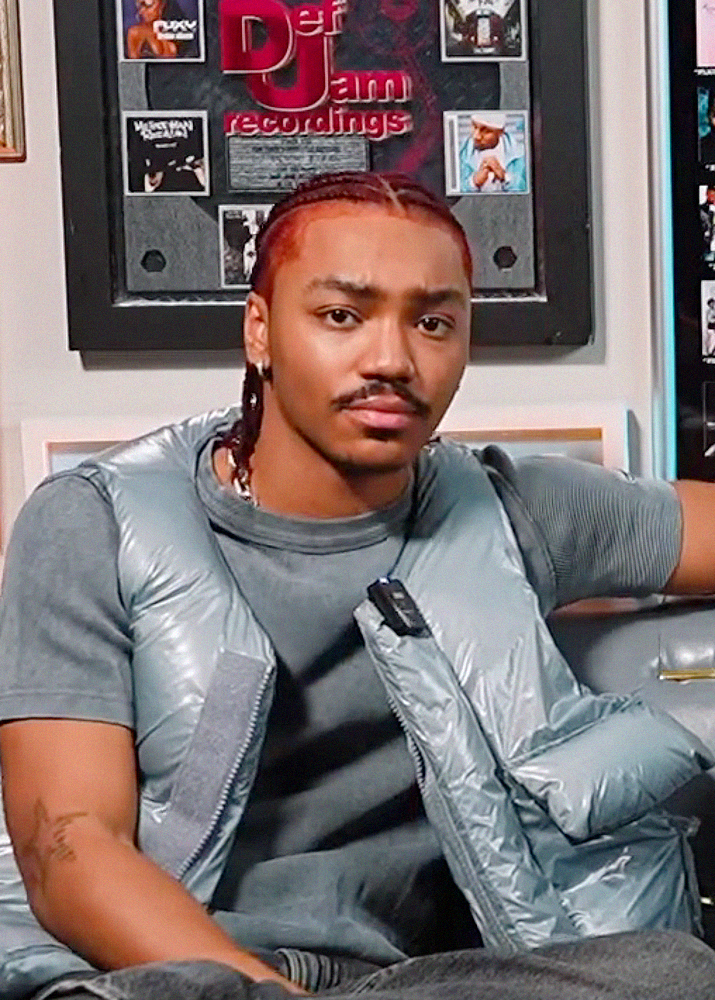
- Levi in 2024

Background information
- Born: Joshua Levi Bolden; October 7, 1998 (age 28); Houston, Texas
- Genre: R&B
- Occupations: Singer; actor; dancer
- Years active: 2009–present
- Labels: Love Quotient Records; Atlantic; Raedio

Joshua Levi Bolden (born October 7, 1998) is an American singer-songwriter and actor from Houston, Texas. He first gained attention for his role in the NBC television series Friday Night Lights. He then attained further prominence after being the seventh contestant eliminated on the third season of The X Factor USA. After performing as part of a short-lived boy group, Levi released his debut extended play DISC ONE in July 2020.

After his EP caught the attention of Issa Rae he signed to her namesake label Raedio and Atlantic Records in 2021.

In March 2022, Levi voiced the character of Aaron Z from the fictional boy band 4*Town in the Pixar animated film Turning Red. He was featured on the song "Nobody Like U" from the film's soundtrack, co-written by Billie Eilish and Finneas O'Connell. The song saw immediate success, peaking at number 49 on the Billboard Hot 100, Levi's first charting hit. The song also earned him his first Grammy Award nomination later in November 2022. In the meantime, Levi released the follow-up to his first extended play DISC TWO, in June 2022.

In October 2025, Levi released his debut studio album HYDRAULIC.

== Career ==
=== 2009–2019: Acting, The X Factor and Citizen Four ===
Levi started his career in 2009, when he landed the role of Darius Merriweather on the television series Friday Night Lights, which he starred in for two seasons.

In 2013, he was a contestant on season 3 of the television series The X Factor USA. After he was eliminated, Levi returned to the show to participate with the top 12 of the competition. Levi then advanced to the top eight slots before he was eliminated for a second time. In February 2014, Levi released his debut single "Trying to Find You". In June 2014, he appeared at a DigiTour show in Dallas, Texas, in June. He also performed at the outlets at Anthem tree lighting ceremony in Phoenix, Arizona, and the Citadel Outlets in Los Angeles in November 2014. In 2015, Levi toured with Aaron Carter; and released an official cover of Rihanna, Kanye West, and Paul McCartney's single, "FourFiveSeconds". In 2016, Levi collaborated with American singers Niki and Gabi on a cover of "Work From Home" by Fifth Harmony.

In early 2017, he formed a group named Citizen Four alongside Carson Boatman, Connor Boatman, and fellow The X Factor contestant, Austin Percario for Island Records. In August 2017, it was announced that Levi had left the band. That same year, he made a guest appearance on the Nickelodeon series The Thundermans. In 2018, Levi made another Nickelodeon guest appearance on the television series Game Shakers.

=== 2019–2024: Solo music career, college education and record deal ===
Following his exit from the group Citizen Four, Levi shifted his full attention towards his education and solo ventures. In July 2019, he earned a Bachelor's degree of science in business and finance from Full Sail University. In July 2020, he released he first extended play DISC ONE. In October 2020, he released the music video for his song "Don't They", which included a cameo by his childhood friend singer Normani. Celebrity photographer Blair Caldwell directed the music video in his directorial debut.

In September 2021, Levi signed to Issa Rae's Raedio and Atlantic Records. He also released the song "NASA" and its music video. In 2022, Levi voiced the character of Aaron Z from the fictional boy band 4*Town in the Pixar animated film Turning Red. In April 2022, he earned his first Billboard Hot 100 charting hit with the Billie Eilish and Finneas O'Connell co-written "Nobody Like U" from the film's soundtrack, which peaked at number 49. In June 2022, Levi released the remix to his song "Don't They" featuring Normani, from his second extended play DISC TWO. In May 12, 2023, Levi released the deluxe to his second extended play called DISC TWO (SCRATCHED UP) which features the viral hit single, "Birthday Dance". Levi also announced that he was working on his debut studio album.

On May 31, 2024 Levi released single SOMETHING MORE.

=== 2025: HYDRAULIC and tour ===
On April 4, 2025, Levi began touring as the support act for Flo on the North American leg of their Access All Areas tour, concluding in Los Angeles on May 25, 2025.

On June 4, 2025, Levi announced his debut album, HYDRAULIC would be released in the summer of 2025, preceded by the lead single FEEL THE BA$$, and DON'T GO.

The album's release faced multiple delays; originally slated for a summer release, HYDRAULIC was eventually released on October 10, 2025. The album was received to acclaim, with critics praising its "glossy" production choices and Levi's "silky" vocals. A primarily pop and R&B record, the album features collaborations with BEAM and Flo and production from MNEK and London on da Track.

Levi has also hinted on multiple occasions about the possibility of a future tour.

On September 16, 2026, Levi released Hydraulic: Fueled Up, an extended deluxe version of Hydraulic; "Say It (Remix)", a collaboration with singer Brandy, was released the same day.

== Filmography ==
=== Television ===
Year	Title	Role	Notes	Ref.
2009–2011	Friday Night Lights	Darius Merriweather	8 episodes	
2016	Days of Our Lives	DJ	Episode: "#1.12833"	
2016	Royal Crush	Jordan	6 episodes	
2016	NU Skool Records	Mitchell	Television short	
2017	The Thundermans	Drake	Episode: "Date of Emergency"	
2017	That's the Gag	Waiter	Episode: "Keke Gets Bad Press"	
2018	Game Shakers	Rick	Episode: "Babe & the Boys"	

=== Film ===
Year	Title	Role	Notes	Ref.
2009	I Pledge Allegiance...	Lenny	Short film	
2010	Halo Legends	Kid B (voice)	Direct-to-video	
2014	The Next Dance	Young Tristian	Direct-to-video	
2017	School Spirits	Mickey		
2022	Turning Red	Aaron Z. (4*Town) (voice)	Theatrical release	

== Discography ==
=== Albums & EPs ===
Title	Details
DISC ONE	Released: 3 July 2020; Label: Love Quotient Records; Formats: streaming, digital download
DISC TWO	Released: 10 June 2022; Label: Raedio LLC, Atlantic; Formats: streaming, digital download
DISC TWO (SCRATCHED UP)	Released: 12 May 2023; Label: Raedio LLC, Atlantic; Formats: streaming, digital download
HYDRAULIC	Released: 10 October 2025; Label: Raedio LLC, Atlantic; Formats: streaming, digital download

=== Singles ===
- 2018: "98"
- 2018: "Doorstep"
- 2018: "Drive By"
- 2019: "Seen It All"
- 2020: "If the World"
- 2021: "NASA"
- 2021: "What's the Use" (with Raedio)
- 2022: "VICES"
- 2022: "Don't They [Remix]" (feat. Normani)
- 2023: "EGO"
- 2023: "BIRTHDAY DANCE"
- 2024: "SOMETHING MORE"
- 2025: "FEEL THE BA$$"
- 2025: "DON'T GO"
- 2025: "HOLD ON"
- 2026: "SWERVE"

== See also ==
- Normani
- Dylan Sinclair
- Coco Jones
- FLO
