= Hiroshi Takeshima =

Japanese enka singer (born 1978)

Hiroshi Takeshima (竹島 宏, Takeshima Hiroshi; born August 28, 1978) is a Japanese enka singer. He has one major hit with "Sapporo Elegy" in 2001. On December 30, 2021, Takeshima won the Japan Composer's Association Award at the 63rd Japan Record Awards.

== Albums ==
1. First
2. Best Selection
