= Turning Red (soundtrack) =

2022 soundtrack album by Ludwig Göransson

Turning Red (Original Motion Picture Soundtrack)

Soundtrack album by Ludwig Göransson
- Released: March 11, 2022
- Recorded: 2021–2022
- Studios: Newman Scoring Stage; Elbo Studios; Warner Bros. Eastwood Scoring Stage; Los Angeles Philharmonic Orchestra
- Genres: Electronic; pop; jazz
- Length: 76:55
- Label: Walt Disney

Ludwig Göransson chronology
Bad Trip (2021)	Turning Red (2022)	Black Panther: Wakanda Forever (2022)

Singles from Turning Red
- 1. "Nobody Like U" Released: February 25, 2022

Turning Red (Original Motion Picture Soundtrack) is the soundtrack album to Disney/Pixar's 2022 film of the same name. The film featured three original songs written by Billie Eilish and Finneas O'Connell, the latter appeared as the member of the fictional boy band 4*Town. The rest of the tracks, are instrumentals from the film score composed by Ludwig Göransson for his first animated feature film. Walt Disney Records released the soundtrack album digitally and on CD on March 11, 2022.

== Background and production ==
On July 14, 2021, following the release of the teaser trailer, Ludwig Göransson was announced to composed the film's score, making it his first animated film composition. Billie Eilish and Finneas O'Connell, having previously co-written and producing the theme song and soundtrack for the James Bond installment No Time to Die with Hans Zimmer and Steve Mazzaro, wrote three original songs performed in the film by the fictional boy band 4*Town. Tom MacDougall, executive producer of Disney Music Group, had been a fan of Ellish's work since "Ocean Eyes" and claimed that he was impressed "by the breadth of the territory that their songwriting and performing covered". The score and the songs, were first recorded in late-2020, after the COVID-19 pandemic lockdown restrictions were lifted.

"I wanted to score to represent those uncomfortable and confusing feelings that we all encounter in our journey to adulthood [...] It's a crazy mix of musical genres, from New Jack Swing to '90s boy-band, traditional Chinese sounds and Western orchestra. I wanted the music to act like a mixtape for Mei."

— Göransson, about the score for Turning Red.

According to the executive producer of Pixar Animation Studios, Lindsay Collins, "U Know What's Up" was intended to be a confidence booster, "1 True Love" was intended as the group's love ballad, and "Nobody Like U" was the song that everyone knows from the group. Collins said she had decided to approach Eilish and O'Connell at the start of the production, near the same time that Eilish was coming to fame herself; Collins said that her own child had become a fan of Eilish's music which has inspired this choice. To pitch the idea to the pair, production created a scrapbook based on scenes of Mei and her fascination with 4*Town they had already developed for the film, at times putting cutouts of Eilish' and O'Connell's heads in place of the 4*Town members to show their appreciation for the pair. Both were already animation fans, and Eilish said that when they saw the concept from the material they got, she immediately got the idea they were aiming for, as she had been a fan of boy bands herself and recognized the bond Mei had with 4*Town.

For writing Mei's theme, several instruments such as conventional Western flute, dizi and a Chinese bamboo flute were used. For Mei's mother Ming, he played guzheng, during his period of research, despite hiring professional soloists during the recording session. Göransson described the theme for panda (Mei) as "quirky" and "awkward", and while recording, he used varied instruments, including: erhu and bianzhong, accompanied by a synthesiser. For the rest of the family and the mystic past, he used pipa and Chinese opera percussion. The sounds, were accompanied by the 75-piece members from the Los Angeles Philharmonic Orchestra. Göransson said, "Adding orchestra was the last element. I used them to beef up the main ideas and make it feel more cinematic," he says. The result is wild, raucous fun, with traditional Chinese instruments flavoring an often fast-moving, big-beat orchestral groove that propels Turning Red to its satisfying conclusion." The score was recorded within two weeks.

The film includes a Cantonese chant used as part of the ritual to contain the red panda spirit that was created with help of Herman Wong, operations director for Disney Character Voices International. This chant then also had to be integrated with Ellish's and O'Connell's "Nobody Like U" as part of the film's climax, which was done by Göransson to make sure the two rhythms matched in beat and key. Subsequently, tracks from 4*Town appeared in multiple languages, some of which were performed by boy bands such as Da-iCE for Japanese and W0LF(S) for Mandarin. "Cha Cha Slide" (2000) by DJ Casper and "Bootylicious" (2001) by Destiny's Child are also heard in the film.

== Track listing ==
All tracks are composed by Ludwig Göransson, except where indicated.

No.	Title	Writer(s)	Performer	Length
1.	"Nobody Like U"	Billie Eilish; Finneas O'Connell	4*Town	2:40
2.	"1 True Love"	Eilish; O'Connell	4*Town	3:19
3.	"U Know What's Up"	Eilish; O'Connell	4*Town	3:08
4.	"Family"			0:40
5.	"Turning Red"			2:10
6.	"Meilin Lee"			0:58
7.	"Temple Duties"			1:13
8.	"Jin's Family Dinner"			0:56
9.	"Drawing Love"			2:15
10.	"Never Again Dream"			1:34
11.	"Turning Panda"			2:16
12.	"Panda-monium"			2:34
13.	"Ancestors"			4:39
14.	"Inconvenient Genetics"			3:35
15.	"U Know What's Up" (The Panda Hustle version)	Eilish; O'Connell	4*Town	2:49
16.	"Tyler's Deal"			2:19
17.	"The Aunties"			0:37
18.	"Grandma's Warning"			1:31
19.	"Keeping the Panda"			5:14
20.	"Dad Talk"			2:28
21.	"Red Moon Ritual"			3:19
22.	"I'm Keeping It"			1:42
23.	"Making It Right"			1:59
24.	"Unleashing the Panda"			2:06
25.	"Stadium Ritual"			2:00
26.	"Pandas Unite / Nobody Like You" (reprise)	Göransson; Eilish; O'Connell	Göransson; 4*Town	3:05
27.	"The Real Ming"			1:59
28.	"No Going Back"			3:13
29.	"Let Your Inner Panda Out"			1:30
30.	"Nobody Like U" (Instrumental)	Eilish; O'Connell	O'Connell	2:40
31.	"1 True Love" (Instrumental)	Eilish; O'Connell	O'Connell	3:19
32.	"U Know What's Up" (Instrumental)	Eilish; O'Connell	O'Connell	3:08
Total length:				76:55

== Critical response ==
Alan Kronenberg's analytical review for The Observer, stated that "The 4*Town songs are expertly performed and are so catchy and similar to the boy band songs of the era that viewers have seen people people posting about how the voice talents should actually become a band and do live performances. Similarly, Göransson's score is an artistic triumph that encapsulates the story of the movie so well through the various styles and fusions of music. The resulting score comprises a whole slew of genres ranging from boy band beats, traditional Chinese music and more Western hip-hop, along with orchestral sounds." Quynh Anh Tong of The State News said, "First, the nostalgia is undeniably strong in "Turning Red". The music, written and produced by the duo Billie Eilish and Finneas O'Connell, evoked the soundscape of the late 90s - early 2000s. Music also became a major plot driver of the movie, with a fictional boy band becoming the forces that unite Mei and her friends at the same time as creating conflict between the mother and daughter duo. Some cultural relics also appear in the movie, apparent in the dialogue of the characters to the books they were holding." Popsugar called it as "an amazing soundtrack, filled with plenty of nostalgic sounds and songs to accompany the characters throughout the movie [...] the soundtrack will fill your heart with joy and bring out your inner teenager."

== Additional music ==
The track "Larger Than Life" by the Backstreet Boys was featured in the first trailer of the film, and NSYNC's "It's Gonna Be Me" was featured in the second trailer. The tracks were used for promotional purposes, and were neither featured in the soundtrack nor the film.

== Charts ==
Chart performance for Turning Red (Original Motion Picture Soundtrack)
Chart (2021)	Peak position
UK Compilation Albums (OCC)	35
UK Soundtrack Albums (OCC)	26
US Billboard 200	87
US Soundtrack Albums (Billboard)	16
