= 63rd Japan Record Awards =

2021 Japanese music awards ceremony

- Date: 30 December 2021
- Location: New National Theatre Tokyo
- Hosted by: Riho Yoshioka; Shinichiro Azumi

Television/radio coverage
- Network: TBS

The 63rd Japan Record Awards (第63回日本レコード大賞, Dai Rokujū San-kai Nihon Rekōdo Taishō) was held on 30 December 2021.

Nominations and awards were announced by the organizers on 19 November. Like the previous award ceremony, the Best Album Award, Songwriting Award, Composition Award, Merit Award, and Planning Award were not presented due to the COVID-19 pandemic.

== Presenters ==
- Riho Yoshioka
- Shinichiro Azumi (TBS Announcer)

== Winners ==
=== Grand Prix ===
- Da-iCE – "Citrus"
  - Artist: Da-iCE
  - Lyrics: Taiki Kudo, Sota Hanamura
  - Music: Kaz Kuwamura, Shōgo Nakayama
  - Arranger: Shōgo Nakayama, TomoLow

=== Excellent Work Awards ===
- LiSA - "Akeboshi"
- Junretsu - "Kimi ga Soba ni Iru kara"
- Nogizaka46 – "Gomen ne Fingers Crossed"
- Da-iCE - "Citrus"
- NiziU - "Take a Picture"
- Da Pump - "Dream on the Street"
- AKB48 - "Nemohamo Rumor"
- Daichi Miura – "Backwards"
- Kiyoshi Hikawa – "Happy!"
- Awesome City Club - "Wasurena"

=== Best New Artist ===
- Macaroni Enpitsu

=== New Artist Awards ===
- INI
- Taeko
- Macaroni Enpitsu
- Luca Mochizuki

=== Best Vocal Performance ===
- Misia

=== Special Award ===
- Ado
- Bank Band
- Takashi Matsumoto
- Yoasobi

=== Japan Composer's Association Award ===
- Hiroshi Takeshima

=== Special Achievement Award ===
- Makoto Kawaguchi (composer)
- Makoto Kitajo (lyricist)
- Asei Kobayashi (composer)
- Masatoshi Sakai (producer)
- Sumiko Sakamoto (singer)
- Jerry Fujio (singer)
- Koichi Sugiyama (composer)
- Jun Suzuki (composer)
- Takeshi Terauchi (guitarist)

=== Special International Music Award ===
- BTS
