= Scratch vocal =

Preliminary audio recording for reference

A scratch vocal or guide vocal is an audio recording made without the intention of being kept. The recording is intended for reference only. These vocals can be used for music or animation. In music, a singer may use a scratch recording to rerecord the song later. In animation, scratch vocals are often used to check the story and can be kept instead of auditioning for another vocalist.

== In music ==
A scratch vocal is a vocal performance that a singer records to provide a reference track that music producers and audio engineers can use as they craft other pieces of the recorded song.

Most of the time, the singer of a scratch vocal ultimately re-records the vocal performance after production is complete. However, there are a number of exceptions to this rule, such as "The Piña Colada Song" by Rupert Holmes, where the re-recording lacked the desired energy and spontaneity, or "Superstar" by the Carpenters, where the scratch was so well performed that a re-record was deemed unnecessary.

A guide vocal is a vocal performance that a singer records to provide a reference track for another singer or singers who will be performing or recording the song.

== In animation ==
Scratch vocals are also often used in the production of feature-length animated films to bring storyboards to life as "animatics," in which storyboard frames are synced to the relevant dialogue, together with a rough soundtrack generated on a synthesizer. Animation directors "hire temporary voices to help find their way through various script revisions, visual renderings and other steps of the process." Scratch vocals may be obtained from professional voice actors (who may or may not be well-established in the voice-over community but are generally unknown to the general public) or from anyone around the studio willing to chip in a line or two (as well as friends or family members).

For lead roles of animated films, scratch vocals are nearly always replaced in the final cut by vocal tracks recorded by bankable stars or experienced character actors. However, in the rush to meet deadlines, if the scratch vocals for a minor role are good enough, the director may skip auditions and simply use the actor who recorded the scratch vocals in the role. This is how many animation studio employees (and their friends and family members) end up with minor credits as cast members on their studio's products.

If scratch vocals for a lead role are exceptionally good, the studio may approve casting of the scratch vocalist in the lead role—as occurred with Pixar's Turning Red (2022).

The current pattern of first building a rough draft of an entire animated film with scratch vocals and animatics was a relatively late development. In 1993, Toy Story (released in 1995) was the first animated film for which scratch vocals were recorded for all reels. Before that point, development of animated films was much more chaotic in terms of when scratch vocals versus production sound were used for any particular reel in the film. For example, in the 1980s, Walt Disney Feature Animation experimented with recording production sound for all reels before starting animation and then using scratch vocals only for changes.
