= Da-ice =

Japanese male vocal and dance group

Da-iCE
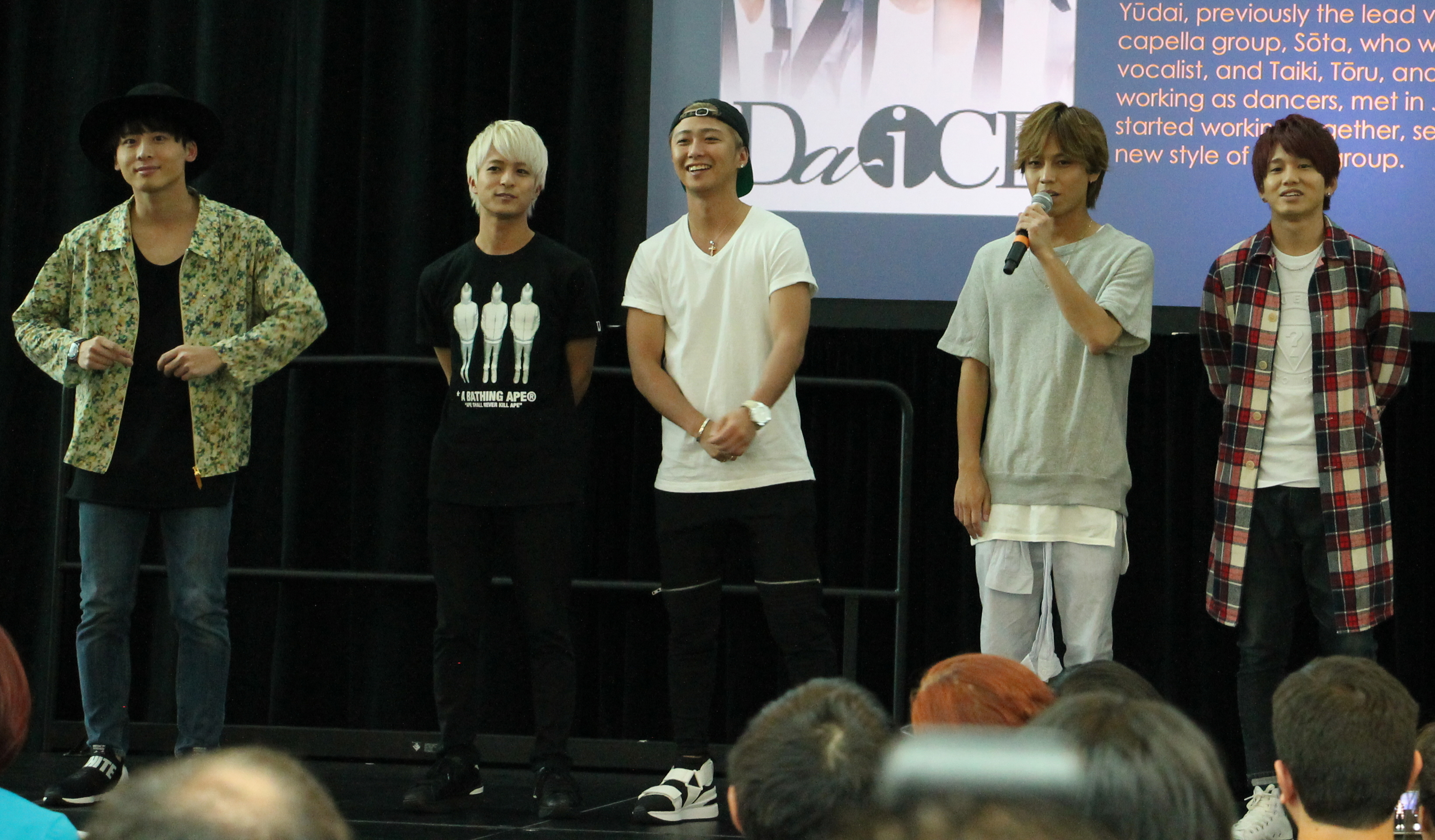
- Da-iCE in 2016; From left: Taiki Kudo, Hayate Wada, Yudai Ohno, Toru Iwaoka, Sota Hanamura

Background information
- Origin: Japan
- Genres: J-pop, EDM, Eurodance, dubstep
- Years active: 2011–present
- Labels: Universal Sigma (2014-2020); Avex Trax (2020-)
- Members: Taiki Kudo; Toru Iwaoka; Yudai Ohno; Sota Hanamura; Hayate Wada
- Website: da-ice.jp

Da-ice (ダイス, Daisu; stylized as Da-iCE and pronounced "dice"), is a Japanese boy band. The group consists of five members: Yudai Ohno, Toru Iwaoka, Taiki Kudo, Sota Hanamura, and Hayate Wada. They were formerly signed to Universal Sigma until they transferred to Avex Trax in June 2020. They are currently managed by Avex Management Inc.

== Name ==
Despite the hyphen in the group's name, it is pronounced as "dice". Five sides of a die represent the members, while the last side represents the fans. The "a-i" in the name is intentionally spelt in lowercase, as "ai" means love in the Japanese language.

== History ==
=== 2011–2014: Formation and early years ===
In January 2011, Yudai Ohno, Toru Iwaoka, Taiki Kudo, Sota Hanamura, and Hayate Wada were gathered and formed into a group by their current manager. The group, initially named Blackout, soon decided to change the name because "blackout" meant a power outage. In April, they held their first concert in Shibuya Vuenos.

From May to September 2012, Da-ice performed as the opening act for their agency mates AAA in "AAA Tour 2012 -777- Triple Seven". This significantly widened their exposure to the public, and by the end of the tour their Twitter followers had grown from about 2,000 to over 10,000. On 12 December 2012, the group released their self-titled debut indie mini-album. It ranked 1st on the Recochoku ringtone daily chart, and reached a peak of number 15 on the Oricon Daily Albums Chart.

Following the release of the album, Da-ice held their first tour in January 2013. In May of the same year, they held their second tour. In June 2013, they released their first indie single, "I'll Be Back". The single ranked number 14 on the Oricon Weekly Singles Chart, and achieved number one on the Recochoku ringtone daily chart. In July, they announced they would be making their debut in 2014, and in October, it was announced that a nationwide online vote would determine their debut single. At the end of 2013, the group transferred to Universal Music Japan's subsidiary, Universal Sigma.

In January 2014, the group released their debut single, "Shout It Out", which ranked second place on the Oricon Daily Chart and fourth place on the Oricon Weekly Charts. The single was chosen by their fans from three possible songs.

In March, they held their third tour. Following the release of two subsequent singles, Da-ice released their first full album, Fight Back, as well as a DVD of their third tour, on 15 October. On 8 November 2015, the group announced that they would be releasing their second full-length album Every Season. All four singles from 2015 will be included in this album.

=== 2016–present: Every Season ===
Officially released on 6 January 2016, Every Season ranked first place on the Oricon Daily Ranking on 5 January, a day prior to its official release. Their album sales had reached more than 30,000 copies sold. Every Season includes four singles from 2015 and a collaboration with SKY-HI from their senior group, AAA. On 1 February 2016, it was announced that Da-iCE would perform their first Hall Tour across Japan starting in July, with its final stop at Tokyo Nippon Budokan on 1 January 2017. This would be the first time the group had performed at an Arena as a solo act. On 8 February, they wrapped up their third tour with a surprise announcement of their single "Watch Out", and their third concert live DVD Da-ice Live House Tour 2015–2016: Phase 4 Hello, released simultaneously on 6 April 2016. The single "Watch Out" was released in 3 versions and individual member versions. The third live DVD featured the semi-final performance in Tokyo at the Toyosu PIT on 31 January 2016, and included a limited edition one hour recording called "the Road to Nippon Budokan".

On 22 December 2021, the group released their single "liveDevil", which serves as the opening theme song for the 32nd entry of the Kamen Rider series, Kamen Rider Revice. The song featured additional vocals from Subaru Kimura, who also voiced one of Revice's main characters. The side B of the single featured "Promise", the ending song for the movie "Kamen Rider: Beyond Generations". On 30 December, their single "Citrus" won the Grand Prix at the 63rd Japan Record Awards.

The group is featured as the fictional boy band 4*Town in the Japanese dub of the 2022 Pixar film Turning Red. They performed Japanese version of the song "Nobody Like U", titled "どんな君" (Donna Kimi Mo) and released on 25 February 2022, as a single on major platforms including YouTube and Spotify; most of its lines are sung by Sota and Yudai.

== Members ==
- Taiki Kudō (工藤大輝) – leader, performer
- Tōru Iwaoka (岩岡徹) – performer
- Yūdai Ohno (大野雄大) – vocalist
- Sōta Hanamura (花村想太) – vocalist
- Hayate Wada (和田颯) – performer

== Discography ==
=== Albums ===
List of albums, with selected chart positions
Title	Type	Album details	Peak positions	Sales (JPN)
Title	Type	Album details	JPN	Sales (JPN)
Da-ice	EP	Released: 12 December 2012 (JPN); Label: Octave; Formats: CD, digital download	33	5,000
Fight Back	Studio	Released: 15 December 2014 (JPN); Label: Universal Sigma; Formats: CD, CD/DVD, digital download	3	15,000+
Every Season	Studio	Released: 6 January 2016 (JPN); Label: Universal Sigma; Formats: CD, CD/DVD, digital download	1	53,000+
Next Phase	Studio	Released: 25 January 2017 (JPN); Label: Universal Sigma; Formats: CD, CD/DVD, digital download	2	50,000+
Bet	Studio	Released: 8 August 2018 (JPN); Label: Universal Sigma; Formats: CD, CD/DVD, digital download	3	TBA
Da-ice Best	Compilation	Released: 6 June 2019 (JPN); Label: Universal Music; Formats: CD, CD/DVD, digital download	2	35,000
Face	Studio	Released: 29 April 2020 (JPN); Label: Avex Trax; Formats: CD+DVD, CD+DVD, digital download	2	?
Six	Studio	Released: 20 January 2021 (JPN); Label: Avex Trax; Formats: CD+DVD, CD+Blu-ray, CD+DVD, digital download	4	?
Reversi	EP	Released: 16 February 2022 (JPN); Label: Avex Trax; Formats: CD+DVD, CD+Blu-ray, CD	2	12,791
Scene	Studio	Released: 24 May 2023 (JPN); Label: Avex Trax; Formats: CD+DVD, CD+Blu-ray, CD	10	10,275
Musi-am	Studio	Released: 2 October 2024 (JPN); Label: Avex Trax; Formats: CD+DVD, CD+Blu-ray, CD	2	15,458
Terminal	Studio	Released: 14 January 2026 (JPN); Label: Avex Trax; Formats: CD+DVD, CD+Blu-ray, CD	5	16,113

=== Singles ===
List of singles, with selected chart positions
No.	Title	Year	Peak chart positions		Album	Sales (JPN)
No.	Title	Year	Oricon Singles Charts	Billboard Japan Hot 100	Album	Sales (JPN)
Indie singles
1	"I'll Be Back"	2013	14	-		6,000
Major singles
Universal Sigma
1	"Shout It Out"	2014	4	19	Fight Back	14,000
2	"Toki"	2014	5	19	Fight Back	15,000
3	"Hush Hush" (ハッシュハッシュ)	2014	8	38	Fight Back	23,000
4	"Mou Ichido Dake" (もう一度だけ)	2015	2	8	Every Season	22,000
5	"Billion Dreams"	2015	4	13	Every Season	26,000
6	"Everybody"	2015	3	3	Every Season	38,000
7	"Hello"	2015	3	4	Every Season	40,000
8	"Watch Out"	2016	3	3	Next Phase	35,000
9	"Paradive" (パラダイブ)	2016	3	4	Next Phase	47,000
10	"Koigokoro" (恋ごころ; Love)	2016	3	5	Next Phase	30,000
11	"Tonikaku Hey" (トニカクHey; Anyway, Hey)	2017	2	2	Bet	38,000
12	"Kimi Iro" (君色; Your Color)	2017	4	6	Bet	31,000
13	"Tokyo Merry Go Round"	2018	2	5	Bet	48,000
14	"Fakeshow"	2018	3	6	Bet	44,700
15	"Kumo O Nuketa Aozora" (雲を抜けた青空; Cloudless Blue Sky)	2018	5	9	Da-ice Best	TBA
16	"Fake Me Fake Me Out"	2019	3	8	Da-ice Best	TBA
17	"Back to Back"	2019	2	7	Face	
Avex Trax
18	"Dreamin' On"	2020	6	35	Six	
19	"Amp"	2020	12	-	Six	
20	"Image"	2020	8	-	Six	
21	"Citrus"	2020	13	7	Six	
22	"Easy Tasty"	2020	17	-	Six	
23	"Bubble Love"	2021	Digital release			
24	"Lights"	2021	Digital release			
25	"Kartell"	2021	Digital release		Reversi	
26	"liveDevil" (featuring Subaru Kimura)	2021	8	25		

=== Video releases ===
List of albums, with selected chart positions
No.	Title	Album details	Peak positions
No.	Title	Album details	JPN
1	Da-ice Live Tour 2014: Phase 2	Released: 15 October 2014 (JPN); Label: Universal Sigma; Format: DVD	9
2	Da-ice Live Tour Phase 3: Fight Back	Released: 15 April 2015 (JPN); Label: Universal Sigma; Format: DVD	12
3	Da-ice Live House Tour 2015–2016: Phase 4 Hello	Released: 6 April 2016 (JPN); Label: Universal Sigma; Format: DVD	5
4	Da-iCE HALL TOUR 2016 -PHASE 5- FINAL in Nippon Budōkan	Released: 14 June 2017 (JPN); Label: Universal Sigma; Format: DVD/Blu-ray	4
5	Da-iCE LIVE TOUR 2017 -NEXT PHASE-	Released: 14 March 2018 (JPN); Label: Universal Sigma; Format: DVD/Blu-ray	5
6	Da-iCE 5th Anniversary Tour -BET-	Released: 6 June 2019 (JPN); Label: Universal Sigma; Format: DVD/Blu-ray	7
7	Da-iCE BEST TOUR 2020 -SPECIAL EDITION-	Released: 17 June 2020 (JPN); Label: Universal Sigma; Format: DVD/Blu-ray	1
8	Da-iCE COUNTDOWN LIVE 2020-2021	Released: 20 September 2021 (JPN); Label: Avex Trax; Format: DVD/Blu-ray	—
9	Da-iCE ARENA TOUR 2021 -SiX-	Released: 16 March 2022 (JPN); Label: Avex Trax; Format: DVD/Blu-ray	—

=== Collaborative works ===
Year	Song	Notes	Release title
2013	"My Generation" (Vimclip)	Featuring vocals from Yudai Ohno and Sota Hanamura	I
2016	"Play 17"	Collaboration with AAA and TRF, song features Yudai and Sota. Hayate features in music video.	TRF×AAA×Da-iCE - Play 17

=== Photobooks ===
Title	Release date
Da-iCE First Photo Book	2015-03-13

== Achievements ==
- 2015
  - The Japan Gold Disc Award 2015 - Best 5 New Artist
- 2021
  - 63rd Japan Record Awards Grand Prix winners
