= Nobody Like U =

2022 song by 4*Town

Single by 4*Town (Finneas O'Connell, Jordan Fisher, Josh Levi, Grayson Villanueva, and Topher Ngo)

from the album Turning Red (Original Motion Picture Soundtrack)
- Released: February 25, 2022
- Genre: Pop
- Length: 2:40
- Label: Walt Disney
- Songwriters: Finneas O'Connell; Billie Eilish

4*Town singles chronology
"Nobody Like U" (2022)	"U Know What's Up" (2022)

Music video
- "Nobody Like U" on YouTube

"Nobody Like U" is a song by fictional boy band 4*Town (consisting of Jordan Fisher, Josh Levi, Grayson Villanueva, Topher Ngo and Finneas O'Connell), written by O'Connell and singer Billie Eilish for Disney/Pixar's 2022 film Turning Red. It was released on February 25, 2022, two weeks before the film's release.

The song peaked at number 49 on the Billboard Hot 100, becoming all five featured artists' first entry on the chart. It also entered the charts in Australia, Canada, Ireland, and the United Kingdom. On November 18, the song was nominated for a Grammy Award for the Best Song Written For Visual Media.

== Background ==
"Nobody Like U" is one of three songs written by Billie and Finneas for the Disney/Pixar 2022 motion picture Turning Red, which takes place in 2002.

== Composition ==
The 2-minute-40-second song is in the key of A minor with a tempo of 104 beats per minute, and a callback to Max Martin-style pop music, precisely by boy bands like NSYNC and Backstreet Boys. Robaire sings the intro, chorus, and outro, while he and Aaron Z. have a rap verse in the middle and other members of the group sing background vocals.

== Chart performance ==
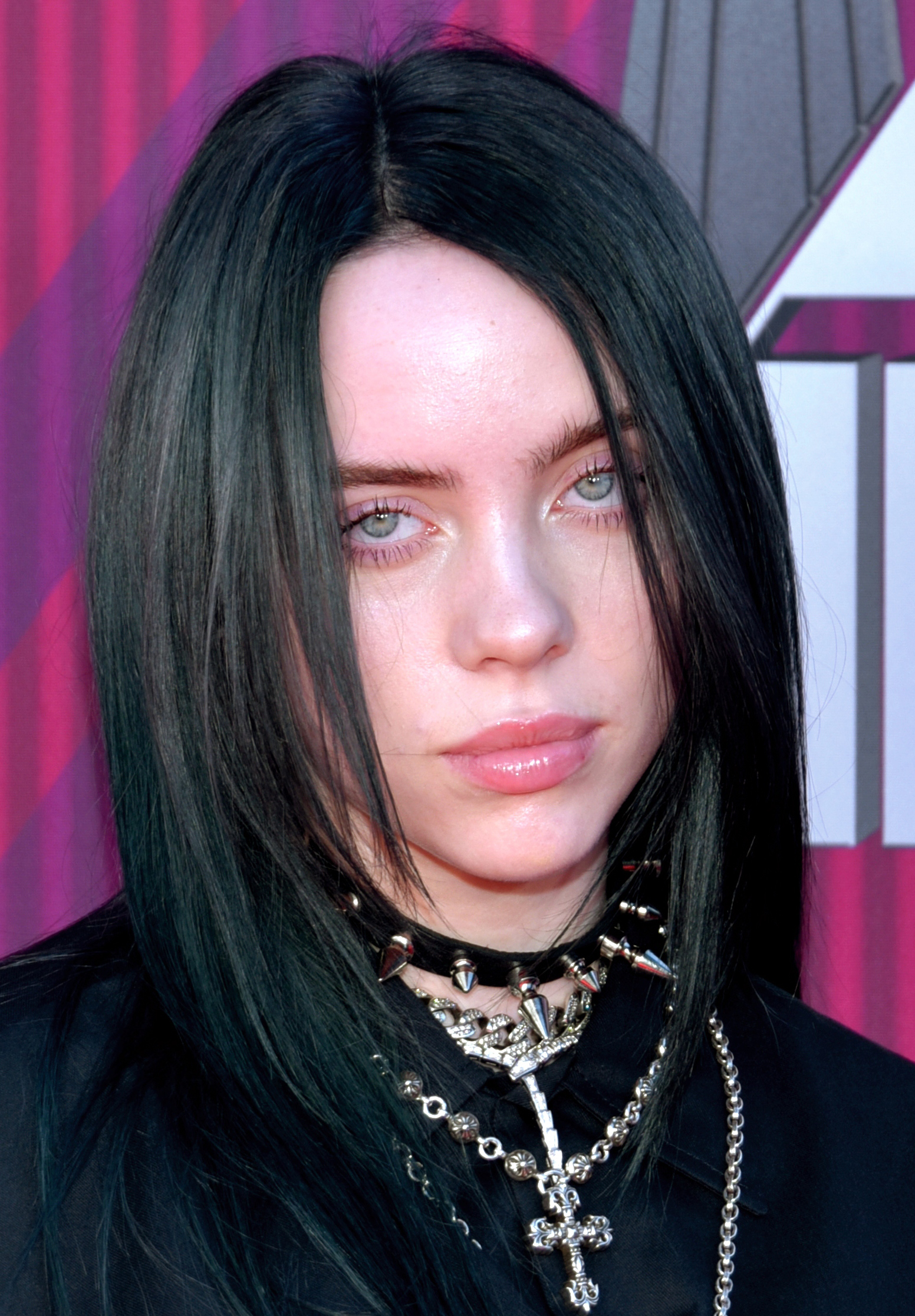
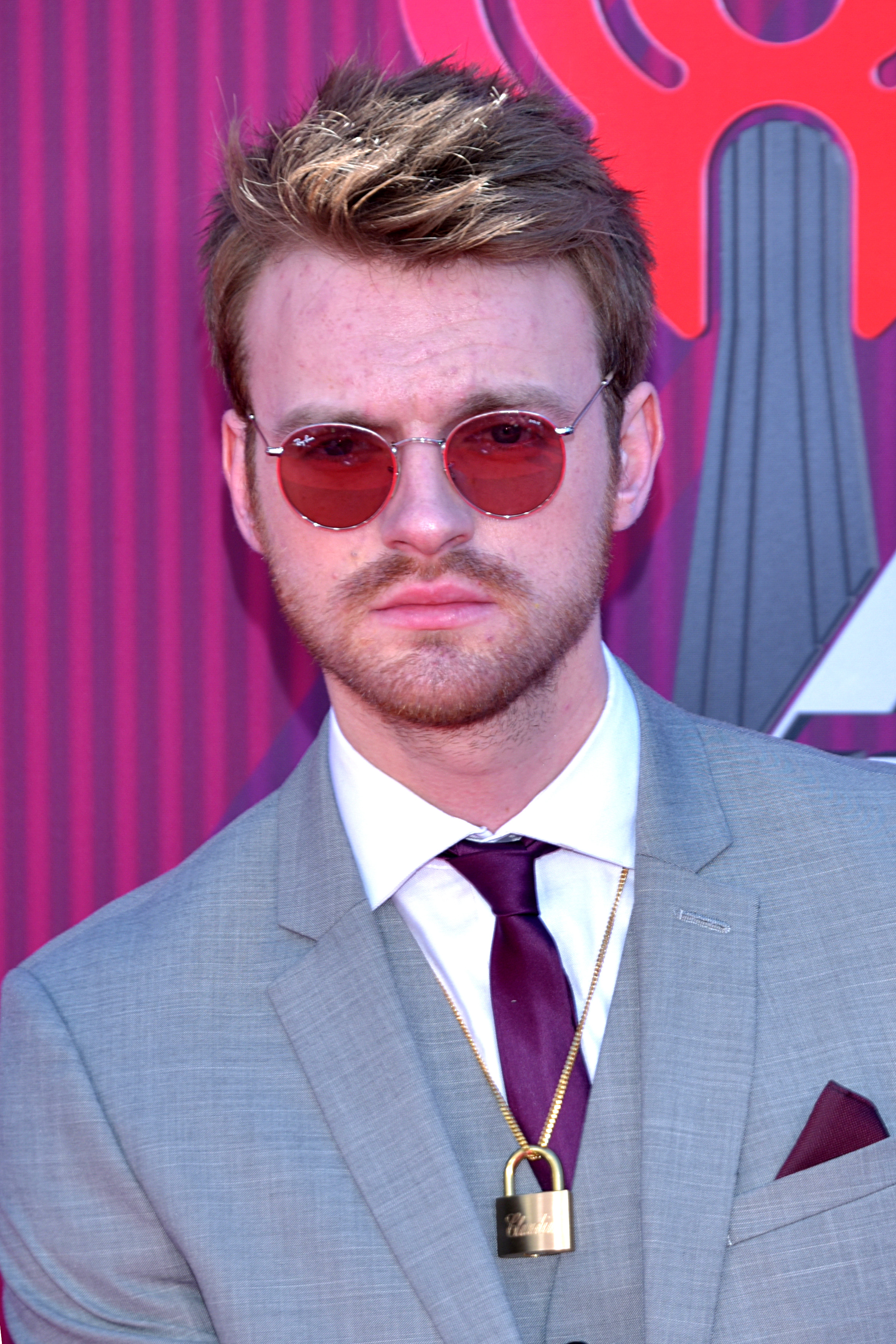
Billie Eilish and Finneas O'Connell wrote the music performed by 4*Town

"Nobody Like U" debuted at number 6 on the Bubbling Under Hot 100 on the week ending March 25, 2022, and number 50 on the Hot 100 the next week, becoming the first song from a Pixar film to reach the chart. Billboard reported on March 28 that the song's debut was driven largely by its 10 million official U.S. streams during its tracking week. "'Nobody Like U' also continues an impressive year for Walt Disney Records on Billboard's charts, after having sent all eight non-score songs from the Encanto soundtrack onto the Hot 100," they also wrote. The song also opened at No. 19 on the Streaming Songs chart, number 77 on the UK Singles Chart (peaking at 57), number 87 on the Canadian Hot 100 (peaking at 34), and number 24 on the NZ Hot Singles chart (peaking at number 18).

== Reception ==
Roxy Simons of Newsweek wrote about the lyrical content, saying, "What seems like a simple track is anything but. While these are sweet lyrics that would make any young listener swoon, it also has a different meaning, namely because the lyrics can be flipped to represent the core friendship in the film and urge the listeners not to cry because the members are there for them, something which also represents the way in which friends support them and help them not to be upset by their predicament." Leanne Butkovic of Thrillist wrote an extensive review, calling 4*Town "the platonic ideal of a 2002 boy band crafted in 2022, a swoon-worthy and diverse quintet of teen idols, each given a backstory devised with boy-band archetypes clearly front of mind," continuing with, "4*Town so perfectly recreates the boy-band fervor of the late '90s and early 2000s. The Grammy-winning siblings absolutely nailed it, down to the songs’ nostalgic production and accurately ridiculous lyrics."

To pitch the idea of having Billie and Finneas as producers, production created a scrapbook based on scenes of Mei and her fascination with 4*Town they had already developed for the film, at times putting cutouts of Eilish' and O'Connell's heads in place of the 4*Town members to show their appreciation for the pair. Both were already animation fans, and Eilish said that when they saw the concept from the material they got, she immediately got the idea they were aiming for, as she had been a fan of boy bands herself and recognized the bond Mei had with 4*Town. Eilish herself also said of the music in a behind-the-scenes featurette, "Writing these songs has literally been the most fun we've had writing. It's the really catchy melody and harmonies, claps and choreography," and described "Nobody Like U" as "the song that viewers will hear the most when they watch Turning Red, the song that everyone knows from the group." Lindsey Collins, the movie's producer, said in an iHeartRadio interview, "They were big fans. They met with them and pitched this crazy idea of a boy band, asking if they’d be interested in writing and producing the songs. They were!"

Director Domee Shi told the Los Angeles Times that the movie was inspired with her own teenage obsession with boy bands, "It just felt right that Mei's ultimate goal in the movie was not to save the world but to go to her first concert with her best friends."

== Multiple language versions ==
Tracks from 4*Town appeared in multiple languages, some of which were performed by boy bands such as Da-iCE for Japanese and W0LF(S) for Mandarin.

== Band website ==
The band has a website of their own, and their fanbase was dubbed the "4-Townies".

== Charts ==
Chart performance for "Nobody Like U"
Chart (2022)	Peak position
Australia (ARIA)	91
Canada Hot 100 (Billboard)	34
Global 200 (Billboard)	37
Ireland (IRMA)	70
New Zealand Hot Singles (RMNZ)	18
UK Singles (Official Charts)	56
US Billboard Hot 100	49

== Certifications ==
Certifications for "Nobody Like U"
Region	Certification	Certified units/sales
Brazil (Pro-Música Brasil)	Platinum	40,000^{‡}
Canada (Music Canada)	Gold	40,000^{‡}
New Zealand (RMNZ)	Gold	15,000^{‡}
United States (RIAA)	2× Platinum	2,000,000^{‡}
^{‡} Sales+streaming figures based on certification alone.
