= Rosalie Chiang =

American actress (born 2005)

- Born: October 1, 2005 (age 21); Fremont, California, U.S.
- Occupation: Actress
- Years active: 2017–present

Rosalie Chiang (born October 1, 2005) is an American actress. She is known for her leading role of Meilin Lee in the Pixar animated film Turning Red (2022).

== Early life ==
Chiang was born on October 1, 2005, in Fremont, California. Her mother is Taiwanese, while her father is Singaporean. Chiang is fluent in the Mandarin Chinese language. Her mother called her Mei-Mei as a child.

== Career ==
Before entering acting, Chiang was an author and wrote two poetry books: A is for Albatross: Birds A to Z and A is for Arowana: Freshwater Fish A to Z. The former received the Skipping Stones Honour Award. Chiang had previously played minor roles in short films and commercials prior to being hired as the lead role in Turning Red. She auditioned for the role using her mother's iPhone 6. During the film's development, Chiang was hired at the age of 12 to record scratch vocals as a temporary placeholder, with the understanding that director Domee Shi and producer Lindsay Collins would later cast a professional actress to re-record her lines before the film's release. However, Chiang turned in scratch vocals so strong that Shi and Collins could not envision anyone else in the lead role. They escalated the issue to Pixar chief creative officer Pete Docter, who personally approved of casting Chiang in the lead role.

== Filmography ==
=== Film ===
Year	Title	Role	Notes	Ref.
2018	The Interns	Rosalie	Short film	
2018	Soiled	Reese	Short film	
2022	Turning Red	Meilin "Mei" Lee	Voice	
2023	Suzume	Chika Amabe	Voice, English dub	

=== Television ===
Year	Title	Role	Notes	Ref.
2017	Clique Wars	Ashley	Episode: "Clique Magic"	
2023	American Born Chinese	Suzy Nakamura	2 episodes	
2023–present	The Simpsons	Hubert Wong	Voice; 3 episodes (replacing Tress MacNeille)	
2025	Sakamoto Days	Lu Xiaotang	Voice, English dub	

=== Video games ===
Year	Title	Role	Notes	Ref.
2023	Starfield	Emily Cartwright, Sonia, Sylvie Munich		
