= Turning Red =

2022 film by Domee Shi

- Promotional release poster
- Directed by: Domee Shi
- Screenplay by: Julia Cho; Domee Shi
- Story by: Domee Shi; Julia Cho; Sarah Streicher
- Produced by: Lindsey Collins
- Starring: Rosalie Chiang; Sandra Oh; Ava Morse; Hyein Park; Maitreyi Ramakrishnan; Orion Lee
- Cinematography: Mahyar Abousaeedi; Jonathan Pytko
- Edited by: Nicholas C. Smith; Steve Bloom
- Music by: Ludwig Göransson
- Production company: Pixar Animation Studios
- Distributed by: Walt Disney Studios; Motion Pictures (Note: Distributed under the Walt Disney Pictures banner.)
- Release dates: March 1, 2022 (El Capitan Theatre); March 11, 2022 (Disney+); February 9, 2024 (United States; theatrical)
- Running time: 100 minutes
- Country: United States
- Language: English
- Budget: $175 million
- Box office: $21.8 million

Turning Red is a 2022 American animated coming-of-age film directed by Domee Shi from a script she wrote with Julia Cho. Produced by Pixar Animation Studios for Walt Disney Pictures, it marks the first Pixar feature film solely directed by a female director. It stars the voices of Rosalie Chiang, Sandra Oh, Ava Morse, Hyein Park, Maitreyi Ramakrishnan, and Orion Lee. Set in Toronto, Ontario in 2002, the film follows Meilin "Mei" Lee (Chiang), a 13-year-old Chinese-Canadian student who transforms into a giant red panda when she experiences any strong emotion, due to a hereditary curse.

Shi, who previously directed the short film Bao (2018), developed the film based on her experiences growing up in Toronto. She pitched three concepts, including Turning Red, to Pixar in October 2017. Development began in May 2018 when Shi was announced as writer and director of a full-length film; several Pixar animators visited locations around Northern California gathering inspiration and visual references. The design and animation were inspired by anime works. To capture these anime influences, hand-drawn 2D animated effects were added atop Pixar's 3D animation. Development on Turning Red lasted for four years, on an approximate $175 million budget, becoming the fastest production for a Pixar film. Ludwig Göransson composed the film's musical score for his first animated film, with Billie Eilish and Finneas O'Connell writing original songs for the film.

Turning Red was first shown in London at Everyman Borough Yards on February 21, 2022, as a special screening, in Toronto at TIFF Bell Lightbox on March 8, and at the El Capitan Theatre in Los Angeles on March 1. Originally planned for a worldwide theatrical release, plans were changed due to the COVID-19 pandemic. The film was released on March 11, 2022, on the Disney+ streaming service and was released theatrically in most countries without the streaming service, grossing over $21 million. It was paired with the short film Kitbull for its theatrical release in the United States and the United Kingdom on February 9, 2024. Turning Red received critical acclaim and was nominated for Best Animated Feature at the 95th Academy Awards, among numerous other accolades.

== Plot ==
In 2002 Toronto, 13-year-old Meilin "Mei" Lee lives with her parents, Ming and Jin, helps take care of the family's temple dedicated to her maternal ancestor Sun Yee, and works to make her mother proud. She hides her personal interests from Ming, such as the fact that she and her friends Miriam, Priya, and Abby are fans of the boy band 4*Town. One night when Ming, who is strict and overprotective, discovers Mei's crush on Devon, the 17-year-old local convenience store clerk, she inadvertently humiliates Mei in public.

That night, Mei has a vivid nightmare involving red pandas; waking up the next morning, she finds that she has transformed into one. She hides from her parents and discovers that she transforms only when she is in a state of high emotion. When Mei reverts to human form, her hair remains red, and so she goes to school in a touque. Ming initially believes Mei is experiencing her first period, but learns the truth when she gets into an altercation with the school's security guard, causing Mei to transform from embarrassment and run home in panic and tears.

Ming and Jin explain that Sun Yee was granted this transformation to protect her daughters and her village during wartime, and that all her female descendants have also had this ability. This has become inconvenient and dangerous in modern times, so the red panda spirit must be sealed in a talisman by a ritual on the night of a lunar eclipse, which will take place in a month's time. Mei's friends discover her transformation, but take a liking to it. Mei finds that concentrating on them enables her to control her transformations.

Ming allows Mei to resume her normal life, but refuses to let Mei attend 4*Town's upcoming concert. Instead, the girls secretly raise money for the tickets at school by exploiting the popularity of Mei's red panda form while lying to Ming about how Mei is spending her time. To raise the last 200 dollars, Mei agrees to attend school bully Tyler's birthday party as the red panda. Before Mei leaves, Mei's grandmother and aunts arrive to assist with Mei's ritual. At the party, Mei is upset to discover that the concert will be on the night she is to undergo the ritual. In her rage, she attacks Tyler when he insults her family, frightening the other kids. Ming discovers Mei's activities and blames Mei's friends for everything. Mei fails to come to her friends' defense to maintain Ming's approval.

While cleaning, Jin finds videos Mei recorded of herself as the red panda with her friends and tells her she should not be ashamed of this side of her, but to embrace it. During the ritual, as Mei's red panda form is about to be sealed, she decides to keep her powers and abandons the ritual to attend the concert at the SkyDome. In making her escape, she breaks Ming's talisman, releasing her red panda form as well. At the concert, Mei reconciles with her friends and Tyler. However, an enraged Ming, having become a kaiju-sized red panda, disrupts the concert while intending to take Mei back by force.

Mei and Ming argue about the former's independence. As they fight, Mei accidentally knocks her mother unconscious. Mei's grandmother and aunts break their talismans to use their red panda forms to help drag Ming into a new ritual circle. Mei's friends and 4*Town join in singing to complete the ritual, sending Mei, Ming, and the other women to the astral plane. Mei reconciles with her mother and helps Ming mend her bond with her own mother, whom Ming accidentally scarred in anger in the past. The other women contain their red pandas in new talismans; Mei decides to keep hers, Ming accepting that she is finding her own path.

Sometime after the incident, now named "Pandapocalypse 2002", the Lee family raises money to repair the damage to the SkyDome. Mei and Ming's relationship has improved. Mei balances her temple duties (where her red panda form is now an attraction) and spends time with her friends and Tyler.

In a post-credits scene, Jin is in the basement listening to 4*Town, embracing the memorabilia.

== Voice cast ==
- Rosalie Chiang as Meilin "Mei" Lee, a 13-year-old Chinese-Canadian girl who discovers she can transform into a giant anthropomorphic red panda whenever she expresses strong emotions
- Sandra Oh as Ming Lee, Mei's strict and overprotective mother
- Ava Morse as Miriam Mendelsohn, a singing Jewish Canadian tomboy with braces who is one of Mei's best friends.
- Maitreyi Ramakrishnan as Priya Mangal, a mellow and deadpan Indo-Canadian girl who is one of Mei's best friends
- Hyein Park as Abby Park, an energetic and aggressive Korean Canadian girl and the shortest of Mei's best friends
- Orion Lee as Jin Lee, Mei's quiet yet supportive father
- Wai Ching Ho as Wu, Mei's grandmother and Ming's mother
- Tristan Allerick Chen as Tyler Nguyen-Baker, Mei's classmate with front teeth braces who initially picks on Mei
- James Hong as Mr. Gao, a local elder, shaman, and friend of the Lee family
- Addie Chandler as Devon, a local convenience store clerk and Mei's secret crush
- Sasha Roiz as Mr. Kieslowski, Mei's high-school teacher at Lester B. Pearson Middle School.
- Lily Sanfelippo as Stacy Frick, a British Canadian girl and one of Mei's classmates who sees her red panda form in the restroom
- Anne-Marie as Lauren, one of Mei's classmates (UK version)

Mei's aunts (Chen, Ping, Helen and Lily) are voiced by Lori Tan Chinn, Lillian Lim, Sherry Cola and Mia Tagano.

The members of the 4*Town boy band (Robaire, Jesse, Aaron Z., Aaron T. and Tae Young) are voiced by Jordan Fisher, Finneas O'Connell, Josh Levi, Topher Ngo and Grayson Villanueva.

== Production ==
=== Development ===
In 2017, Shi had recently completed the Pixar short Bao when Pixar invited her to pitch three ideas for a full-length film. Her proposed concepts were all coming-of-age stories centered on teenage girls. The one that became Turning Red was based on a girl going through a "magical puberty", which Shi wrote based on her own personal experiences. Shi said, "Everyone has been there. Everyone has been thirteen and feeling like they're turning into some wild, hairy, hormonal beast, and I think that's why Pixar was drawn to it". Shi pitched all three concepts, including Turning Red, to Pixar on October 31, 2017. According to Pixar producer Lindsey Collins, who sat in on Shi's pitch meeting, the Pixar staff were drawn to the Turning Red idea as "it was so clear that Domee had such a sense of who these two main characters were, that Mei and Ming were really clear and special and unique, more than any of the other ideas" and that "she had this really personal experience with these two characters that were kind of versions of her own life. That's like the magic equation, right there". The approach of using more personable stories followed from Luca under Pixar's new chief creative officer Pete Docter's oversight, which shifted the direction the studio took with both storytelling and film production. Brenda Hsueh, writer of the subsequent Pixar film Elemental, worked on the film as a consultant to Shi for the ideas.

The film was developed under the working title of Red. Shi was announced as writer and director of an upcoming Pixar full-length film on May 8, 2018, making her the first woman to solely direct a film in the studio. (Note: Brenda Chapman had originally been the sole director on Pixar's 2012 film Brave until she was replaced by Mark Andrews in mid-production, though she was still credited alongside Andrews.) The film's creative leads were also the first all-female team for Pixar, which Pixar's CEO Jim Morris said "happened very organically" rather than by intent. Rona Liu served as production designer, after doing so for Bao. Liu said that working on a feature film was "a dream come true". By November 26, 2018, Shi confirmed that the film was in the early stages of development, with the story still being worked on, and that "[she is] really excited to play in this new 90-minute film format". The title Turning Red was finalized by December 10, 2020. According to Morris, Turning Red had one of the fastest development times of a Pixar feature film, taking only four years to complete.

=== Casting ===
In 2017, Pixar hired Chiang to provide scratch vocals to support the development of the film. Chiang, then only 12 years old, was selected in part because she was a local child actor conveniently based in nearby Fremont, which is only about 35 miles (56 km) from Pixar's Emeryville headquarters. After two years of development, Shi and Collins reached the point where the film was "solid" enough to start casting professional voice actors. Despite listening to various auditions, the two realized they had already fallen in love with Chiang's scratch vocals and could not envision anyone else playing Mei. They escalated the issue to Pixar chief creative officer Pete Docter, who personally approved the casting of Chiang in the film's lead role.

During an early 2020 recording session, Shi suddenly surprised Chiang with an additional script page where Shi, reading in character as Ming, offered Chiang the role. This session, right before the onset of the COVID-19 pandemic in the United States, turned out to be their last one conducted in person. To keep production going, Pixar shipped an enormous amount of professional audio equipment to Chiang, who turned one of the rooms in her parents' house into a makeshift recording studio.

Sandra Oh was Shi's top pick for Ming. Besides the fact that Oh was a fellow Canadian, Shi felt Oh could convey the range of complex emotions they wished to portray in Ming.

=== Design ===
==== Setting ====
The film takes place in Toronto, Ontario, Canada in 2002, as confirmed by a production designer in February 2021. As it takes place through the eyes of a thirteen-year-old girl named Mei Lee, the entire environment has been stylized to convey a specific feeling; Shi described the film's overall look as an "Asian tween fever dream". According to executive producer Dan Scanlon, "It feels more like a very soft, colorful, magical, idyllic, almost youthful version of the city". Shi also considered how video games like Pokémon, EarthBound and The Legend of Zelda: Breath of the Wild were able to "stylize their world in such an appealing, chunky, cute kind of way". Part of this desired setting was capturing the popularity of boy bands at the turn of the millennium and how teenage girls reacted to them. Pixar animators visited locations around Northern California for inspiration and visual references. They studied red pandas at the San Francisco Zoo, and looked at architecture in Chinatown in San Francisco and the Bok Kai Temple in Marysville.

==== Inspirations ====
Domee Shi said that several anime influenced the film, including Doraemon, Sailor Moon, Ranma ½, Fruits Basket, and Inuyasha. To capture these anime influences, hand-drawn 2D animated effects were added atop Pixar's 3D animation. Shi was also inspired by My Neighbor Totoro, in creating an "iconic grabbable giant animal that you just want to rub your face in". Nintendo games, such as Earthbound, Pokémon and The Legend of Zelda, have also been cited as a major influence for the film. Shi also compared the plot of the film to Disney's A Goofy Movie, a similar coming-of-age movie involving a parent and child trying to mend their relationship, with a pop band as part of the film's climax. The film also deals with puberty, though the film does not directly talk of biological changes. For example, Mei's mother mistakes Mei's reaction to her transformation for her first menstruation. Shi said they were "unapologetic" about the discussion of these topics in the film; the title Turning Red is an allegory for menstruation. The color red also reflects other feelings experienced by teenagers, according to Shi, such as embarrassment or lust. Shi and her staff had feared that studio executives would want the scenes referencing puberty removed, but the scenes were accepted.

Liu oversaw the production of the food scenes, as she had done for Bao. They partnered with the non-profit organization Gold House that specializes in promotion of East Asian and Pacific cultures to identify what foods to include. For rendering the foods, they were inspired by the approach that Studio Ghibli had done with foods in their works, as well as exaggerating their look in the same manner that Sanrio uses to bring cuteness into their products, and the way the film The God of Cookery showed food in a "dream glow".

=== Music ===
The film's music is scored by Ludwig Göransson in his first animated film project, and was recorded within a two-week period after COVID-19 lockdown relaxations. The film also featured three original songs written by Billie Eilish and Finneas O'Connell: "Nobody Like U," "1 True Love," and "U Know What's Up." These songs were performed in the film by the fictional boy band 4*Town, which O'Connell was a part of. Producer Lindsey Collins said that her child was a fan of Eilish's music, which inspired her to approach Eilish and O'Connell at the start of production. Collins had pitched to their pair using a scrapbook featuring scenes from the film and cutouts of the duo. Walt Disney Records released the soundtrack album digitally and on CD on March 11, 2022. Subsequently, tracks from 4*Town appeared in multiple languages, some of which were performed by boy bands such as Da-ice (Japanese) and W0LF(S) (Mandarin). The album debuted at number 187 on the Billboard 200 chart on the week of March 21, 2022, and peaked at #87 on the week of April 9, 2022.

== Marketing ==
=== Promotion ===
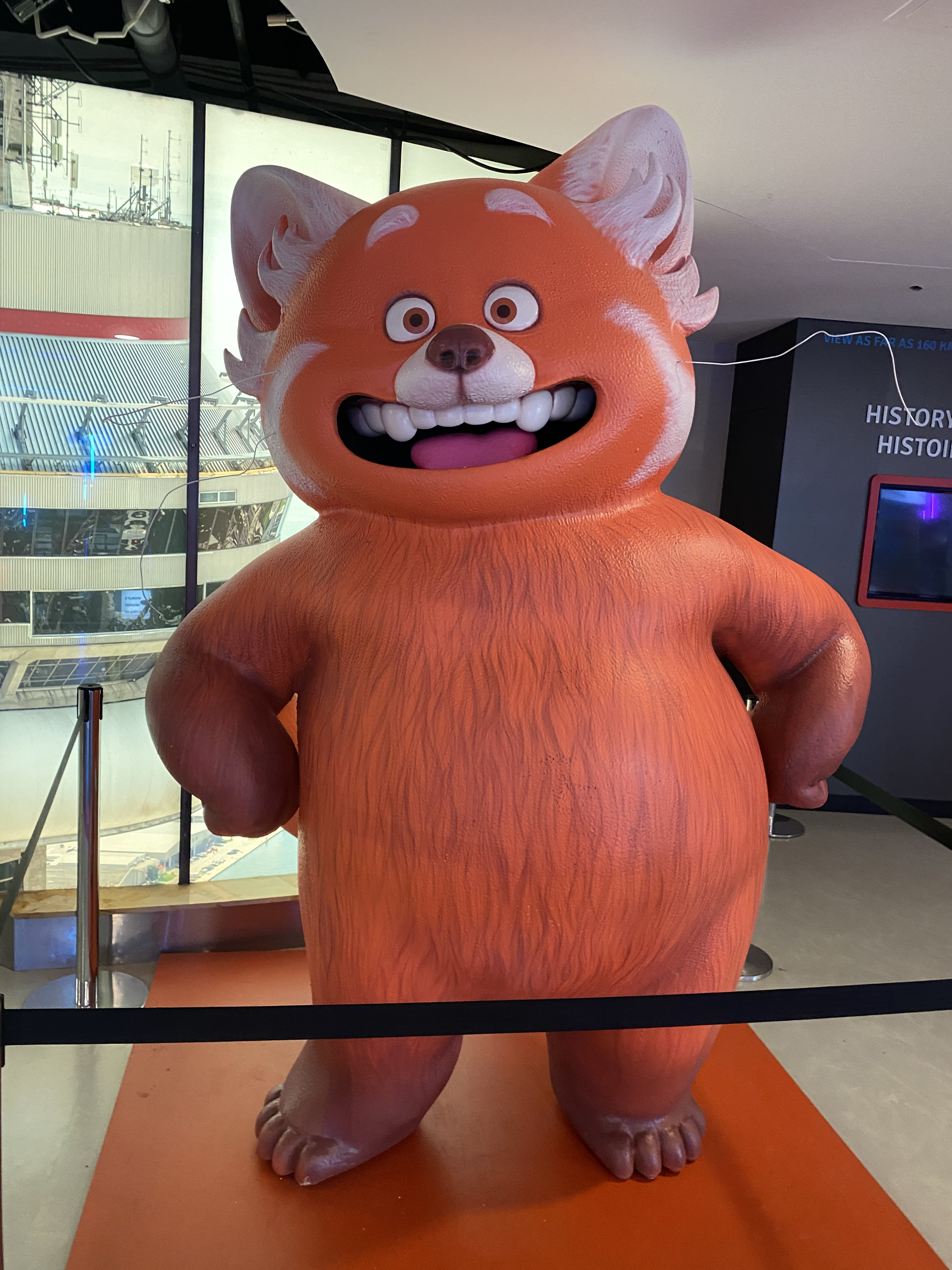
A statue of Mei as a red panda inside the CN Tower in Toronto

A first look of the film was shown at the Disney Investor Day on December 10, 2020. The teaser trailer premiered on July 13, 2021, as the official trailer premiered on November 17, 2021. In the lead up to the film's release, Disney partnered with Mozilla to promote the film via the Firefox web browser, as red pandas are also known as "firefoxes". Users on mobile and desktop are able to apply custom backgrounds and themes within the browser, respectively. According to Mozilla's chief marketing office Lindsey Shepard, the collaboration gives Mozilla the opportunity "to bring [the] Mozilla ethos to the new generation". One of the red pandas at the San Francisco Zoo was renamed Meilin on the day of the film's release.

Air Canada decorated an Airbus A220 with images of Mei and her "red panda form" to fly over Canada promoting the film, and also had a contest for the public to attend the premiere in Toronto and win special prizes. A large statue of Mei as a red panda was placed in Toronto next to the CN Tower, Ripley's Aquarium, Roundhouse Park, Scotiabank Arena and the Rogers Centre (formerly known as Air Canada Centre and the Skydome, respectively) where passerby could have their photos taken with the statue. iSpot.tv reported that Disney had spent $23 million on television spots for Turning Red, which was more than what the studio spent on Black Widow, Jungle Cruise ($19.5 million), and Cruella ($12.6 million), and what Netflix spent on its most-watched film, Red Notice ($3.3 million). Since February 21, 2022, the trailer for the film had been the 16th-most-seen TV spot of all time.

=== Tie-in media ===
Disney licensed several books based on the film, which were released both before and after the U.S. premiere, including novelizations, short stories, a sticker album, a behind-the-scenes book and coloring books. A manga focused on 4*Town, titled 4*Town 4*Real, was released by Viz Media on April 25, 2023. On February 27, 2023, it was announced that Red Panda Mei would become a meet-and-greet character at Shanghai Disneyland for a limited time, from March 1 to May 31, 2023.

== Release ==
=== Theatrical and streaming ===
Turning Red had special screenings that took place in London at Everyman Borough Yards on February 21, 2022, and in Toronto at TIFF Bell Lightbox on March 8, 2022. It premiered at the El Capitan Theatre in Hollywood on March 1, 2022. It was originally scheduled for theatrical release in the United States on March 11, 2022, by Walt Disney Studios Motion Pictures. On June 17, 2021, a Pixar insider reaffirmed the film would have a theatrical release after both Soul (2020) and Luca (2021) were assigned direct-to-streaming releases on Disney+ in response to the COVID-19 pandemic. However, as the Omicron variant cases rose, on January 7, 2022, the decision was made to shift the film from its theatrical release to its direct-to-streaming release on Disney+ as a Disney+ original. In international markets where Disney+ was not available, it was released theatrically.

In February 2022, it was announced that it would play a one-week theatrical engagement at Hollywood's El Capitan Theatre from March 11–17, 2022. It also began playing at Manhattan's AMC Empire 25 and Oakland's Grand Lake Theatre the same day it was released to Disney+, as well as several Showcase Cinema de Lux venues across the United Kingdom. On February 28, 2022, Disney announced that it would be delaying the film's Russian release, originally scheduled for March 10, until further notice in response to the Russian invasion of Ukraine. Embrace the Panda: Making Turning Red, a 48-minute documentary about the film especially focusing on its all-female creative team, was released on Disney+ the same day. On December 5, 2023, it was announced that Turning Red, as well as Soul and Luca, would be released in theaters in the United States throughout early 2024, with Turning Red being released on February 9, 2024, accompanied by Pixar's SparkShorts short film Kitbull.

=== Home media ===
Turning Red was released on digital services on April 26, 2022, and by Walt Disney Studios Home Entertainment on 4K Ultra HD, Blu-ray and DVD on May 3, 2022.

NPD VideoScan reported that Turning Red debuted at No. 2 on both the overall and Blu-ray disc sales charts for the week ending May 7, 2022. In its first week, the film sold roughly 44% as many copies as Spider-Man: No Way Home did in its fourth week. Of these sales, 58% came from HD formats, 35% from standard Blu-ray, and 23% from 4K Ultra HD Blu-ray. The following week, ending May 14, Turning Red moved to No. 4 on both the overall disc sales and Blu-ray charts.

=== Censorship ===
Kuwait refused to distribute the film for its explicit depictions of puberty and other mature themes.

== Reception ==
=== Box office ===
Before February 9, 2024, Turning Red did not see a traditional theatrical release in most markets and was released to the Disney+ streaming service due to COVID-19. By September 2022, the film earned $20.1 million outside the U.S. and Canada. It earned $3.8 million from 12 international markets in the opening weekend, with second-place openings in Saudi Arabia ($920,000), Poland ($430,000) and the United Arab Emirates ($420,000). It earned $2.8 million in its second weekend and $1.7 million in its third. Its domestic gross was $1.4 million during its theatrical re-release.

=== Viewership ===
Analytics company Samba TV, which gathers viewership data from certain smart TVs and content providers, reported that Turning Red was streamed in 2.5 million U.S. households over its opening weekend, marking the highest debut ever for a Disney+ original film. Nielsen Media Research, which records streaming viewership on some U.S. television screens, calculated that Turning Red was the most-streamed program in the U.S. from March 7–13, with 1.7 billion minutes viewed. From March 14–20, the film maintained the top position, accumulating 1.675 billion minutes watched. Turning Red subsequently became the second most-watched film of 2022, garnering 11.4 billion minutes of viewing time. Nielsen subsequently reported that Turning Red had accumulated 8.7 billion minutes of watch time between 2020 and 2025, ranking No. 9 among the most-streamed films during that time frame.

=== Critical response ===
Turning Red received critical acclaim. (Note: Attributed to these sources:) On the review aggregator website Rotten Tomatoes, 95% of 291 critics' reviews are positive. The website's consensus reads, "Heartwarming, humorous, beautifully animated, and culturally expansive, Turning Red extends Pixar's long list of family-friendly triumphs." Metacritic, which uses a weighted average, assigned the film a score of 83 out of 100 based on 53 critics, indicating "universal acclaim".

The Washington Post's Michael O'Sullivan gave 4 stars out of 4 and concludes: "[The film] delivers a bigger, and in some ways more universal message: It's okay to not always be in control, to let your freak flag fly. To paraphrase Sigmund Freud, sometimes a red panda is just a red panda. And sometimes it's a metaphor for that inner spark of creativity, the flame of originality that is to be cherished, not extinguished. With Turning Red, Shi demonstrates that she's got it, in spades". IGN's Siddhant Adlakha gave a rating of 9 out of 10 and concludes: "A story of magical transformation as a metaphor for personal and cultural change, Turning Red (from Bao director Domee Shi) is Pixar's funniest and most imaginative film in years. It captures the wild energy of adolescence, uses pop stars as a timeless window into puberty, and tells a tale of friendship and family in the most delightfully kid-friendly way". Vanity Fair's Richard Lawson commented that "The film often seems squarely, deliberately, aimed at ... parents instead, offering them a gentle (if busy) reminder that they were young once too, once bursting at the seams with enthusiasm and curiosity and, yes, budding lust." The film was also praised for its realistic depiction of female friendships and their ups and downs, which producer Lindsey Collins credited to having mostly women on the creative team. Sara Michelle Fetters describes the film as "a coming-of-age sensation where the supernatural and the mundane happily walk hand in hand, with each eye-popping surprise grounded in lifelike normality."

The Guardian's Benjamin Lee gave 3 stars out of 5 and concludes: "The journey is slick and diverting, and at times incisive, but Turning Red is yet another Pixar film that coasts rather than glides. Hopefully its next offering can turn into something more". Chicago Sun-Times' Richard Roeper gave 2.5 stars out of 4 and comments that "The problems are mostly with the script, which often requires Meilin to be almost irritatingly obnoxious. Meanwhile, her mother behaves like a monster for much of the story, which takes on an increasingly supernatural element to the point where there's a Ghostbusters homage". World's Collin Carbarino comments that, "With Turning Red, Pixar abandons decades of nuanced storytelling and warms over Disney's clichéd advice to follow your heart." The Gospel Coalition's Brett McCracken said that "For all of its merits, the film ultimately advocates a wrongheaded central message under the guise of empowerment: embrace who you are, even your reckless vices and dangerous impulses, and don't let anyone stop you."

CinemaBlend's Sean O'Connell called the focus on a Chinese Canadian girl as "limiting" to a broad audience: "By rooting Turning Red very specifically in the Asian community of Toronto, the film legitimately feels like it was made for Domee Shi's friends and immediate family members. Which is fine – but also, a tad limiting in its scope". The New Yorker's Jane Hu echoed O'Connell's views, accusing the film of relying on East Asian stereotypes and of being "hyper-specific and alienating." O'Connell's review received backlash by members of the press on social media, who called it "sexist" and "racist"; crew and cast members of the movie eventually spoke up on the case. Lead voice actress Rosalie Chiang said the film was meant to appeal to all: "This is a coming of age film, everyone goes through this change ... I think different people of different cultures are going to go through it differently, but at the end of the day, the core messiness and change is something everyone can relate to". As a result of the push-back, CinemaBlend's editor-in-chief Mack Rawden pulled O'Connell's review and apologized publicly for it and that the site had "failed to properly edit" the review before posting; O'Connell also posted his own apology for the review.

The attention drawn by O'Connell's review led to parents and other audience critics to raise further issues with the film due to the character specificity, bringing up concerns that the film, aimed at a family audience, brings up the issues of menstruation, teenage crushes and sexuality, and disobedience of one's parents, which these people felt were topics best left for parents to discuss with their children on their own. Movie critics for The New York Times, The Atlantic, The Daily Beast, and Vox argued that these are natural topics that reflect the realities of 13-year-old girls and should not be considered taboo, and praised the film for its honest portrayal of these behaviors.

In 2023, Barry Hertz of The Globe and Mail named the film as one of the 23 best Canadian comedy films ever made, acknowledging that it was not a Canadian production but writing that "Turning Red gets a pass because it not only reminds audiences of what Pixar can do when it's not in an Elemental-y slump, but showcases one of this country's brightest, funniest filmmakers, who is surely just getting started." Kimberly Jones from The Austin Chronicle summarized the film as a funny, sweet, and empathetic portrait of cultural identity, gentle teen rebellion, and tetchy mother-daughter relations.

=== Accolades ===
At the 95th Academy Awards, Turning Red received a nomination for Best Animated Feature. The film's other nominations include seven Annie Awards, a British Academy Film Award, a Critics' Choice Movie Award, and a Golden Globe Award.

== Possible sequel ==
Domee Shi has expressed interest in a follow-up, stating: "We are open, but we haven't talked about it. But yeah, it's an invitation at the end for more stories". Chiang and Oh also expressed interest and came up with ideas for a sequel or a prequel.

== See also ==
- List of box-office bombs
