= Case Closed season 32 =

Season of television series

Case Closed
- Season 32
- Cover of the first DVD compilation of season 32 by Shogakukan and B Zone
- No. of episodes: 40

Release
- Original network: NNS (ytv)
- Original release: April 23, 2022 – April 8, 2023

Season chronology
- ← Previous; Season 31 Next → Season 33

The thirty-second season of the Case Closed anime was directed by Yasuichirō Yamamoto and Nobuharu Kamanaka, and produced by TMS Entertainment and Yomiuri Telecasting Corporation. The series is based on Gosho Aoyama's Case Closed manga series. In Japan, the series is titled Meitantei Conan (名探偵コナン, lit. Great Detective Conan, officially translated as Detective Conan) but was changed due to legal issues with the title Detective Conan. The series focuses on the adventures of teenage detective Shinichi Kudo who was turned into a child by a poison called APTX 4869, but continues working as a detective under the alias Conan Edogawa.

The episodes use six pieces of theme music: three openings and three endings. The first opening theme is SLEEPLESS by B'z used for episodes 1033 in season 31–1048. The second opening theme is SPARKLE by Maki Ohguro used for episodes 1049–1076. The first ending theme is Karappo no Kokoro (空っぽの心; lit. "Empty Heart") by SARD UNDERGROUND used for episodes 1039 in season 31–1057. The second ending theme is Playmaker (プレイメーカー, Pureimēkā) by all at once feat. Yudai Ohno (from Da-iCE) used for episodes 1058–1073. The third ending theme is Kuufuku (starring VALSHE) (クウフク, Kuufuku) by Konya, Anomachikara used for episodes 1074–1087. The third opening theme is RAISE INSIGHT by WANDS used for episodes 1077–1101.

The season has been airing since April 23, 2022, on Yomiuri TV, Nippon Television and other NNS stations in Japan. Crunchyroll began simulcasting the series in October 2014, starting with episode 754. In February 2023, episodes of the anime appeared on Tubi with an English dub, starting at episode 965. This is the first time since 2010 that any episodes of the main anime series have been dubbed and released in English.

== Episode list ==
No. overall	No. in season	Title	Directed by	Written by	Original release date
1040	1	"The Case of Ayumi's Illustrated Diary 2"; Transliteration: "Ayumi no Enikki Jikenbo Tsū" (Japanese: 歩美の絵日記事件簿２)	Kōichirō Kuroda Yōsuke Fujino	Akatsuki Yamatoya	April 23, 2022
Conan, Ayumi, Mitsuhiko, and Genta were driving in Dr. Agasa's car. On their way home, they pass an office on the third floor of a building and see an unnatural blinking light. Conan and his friends read the "SOS" in Morse code and headed for the office. There they find a motorcycle rider in custody. He tells them that a bomb has been planted here, and Conan and the others flee in a panic.
1041	2	"The Unstated Alibi"; Transliteration: "Ienai Aribai" (Japanese: 言えないアリバイ)	Masahiro Takada	Nobuo Ōgizawa	April 30, 2022
An old lady was pushed down the stone steps of a temple in Yonehana-cho. She says that a young woman down pushed her, but there is no other information. Among the onlookers, she spots a man staring at the old woman. She calls out to him, but he acts suspiciously and leaves the scene, saying he knows nothing about it. Apparently, he had seen the crime scene, but has a reason he cannot tell. Conan and the Detective Boys split into two groups and begin investigating the man. Conan and Haibara learn from a waitress at a coffee shop that he is a man named Kanieda who lives in the town of Shikabane. The town is more than an hour away and they have never been to the coffee shop before, but the waitress remembers a phone call to the coffee shop that was addressed to Kanieida and how he looked at that time. Conan and the others attempt to contact Kanieida, who entrusted them with a lighter that he had left behind at the time. Meanwhile, Mitsuhiko, Genta, and Ayumi, who had been tracking Kanieida, saw him wandering around Yonehana for about an hour, minding his watch, and then getting on a train from Yonehana Station while talking on his cell phone. Why did he use the phone at the coffee shop even though he had a cell phone? Conan is distrustful of Kanieida's appearance. Conan and the others identify the station where Kanieida is headed and chase after him. There, they see him and Detective Takagi and the others together. Conan and his friends interview him and find out that his name is "Eiichi Usui," which they thought was Kanieida. ......
1042	3	"Police Academy Arc Wild Police Story CASE. Kenji Hagiwara"; Transliteration: "Keisatsu Gakkō-hen Wairudo Porīsu Sutōrī Kēsu. Hagiwara Kenji" (Japanese: 警察学校編 Wild Police Story CASE.萩原研二)	Nobuharu Kamanaka	N/A	May 7, 2022
Furuya, Date, Matsuda, and Morobushi are gathered at a party. Date has a girlfriend, but Hagiwara offers to pay for her drinks, so she joins the party as a headcount. Then Hagiwara arrives late, saying that he was late because he was helping his grandmother on the way to the party. The second party is to go to a karaoke bar, but by then Hagiwara is on his own. The next day, while the five of them are cleaning up, an "RX-7FD3S" enters the police academy. Emerging from the car was instructor Onizuka. Hagiwara, who was extremely interested in the car, made an enthusiastic speech that overwhelmed the Onizuka instructor. However, this is not Onizuka's car, but the beloved car of a senior detective who died in the line of duty. The senior detective's daughter is aspiring to become a detective and is keeping it with her until then. During the heavy equipment training that followed, the topic of conversation turned to Hagiwara's condition earlier. Hagiwara's family had a car repair shop, so he was apparently familiar with cars. Their childhood friend, Matsuda, had also been in the Hagiwara family factory, and they were good at tinkering with machinery. Hagiwara said, "I really wanted to take over the factory, but as soon as the business was going well and they added more stores, the economy took a turn for the worse and the factory went under. In contrast, the police never go bankrupt," he says, which is why he decided to become a police officer. After the heavy equipment training, a man approached Hagiwara and Matsuda. The man saw how good they were at their job and said, "I want to scout you for the Explosive Ordnance Disposal Unit. Matsuda immediately replies that he is interested, but Hagiwara refuses, saying that he needs to think about it once. Being in the same department as his friend Matsuda and being able to tinker with the machines he likes--this is appealing to Hagiwara, but there seems to be some reason for his reluctance. ......
1043	4	"The Figure of Revenge"; Transliteration: "Fukushū no Figyua" (Japanese: 復讐のフィギュア)	Minoru Tozawa	Yoshiko Ogata Yueko Keyaki	May 14, 2022
Conan and the Detective Boys come to the apartment of Aoki Keiji, an acquaintance of Mitsuhiko. Aoki is making figures with his college club mates Nao Mizuhara, Kazuya Shiraishi, and Saki Midoriyama, and had promised to show them the figures. While Conan and the others are amazed and curious about what is in the room, Shiraishi is not happy. Shiraishi says, "My future depends on it," and seems to be obsessed with the contest in which he plans to submit the figure he is currently working on. Originally, these five members, plus Yuri Kurose, were the circle's friends. Yuri is deceased, and it was her dream to win a prize in the contest she is participating in this time. While the other members were making plans to visit her grave with the figure on the anniversary of her death, the day of the first screening, Shiraishi left the room, spitting out insults to Yuri such as "No matter how much sense you have, it is meaningless if you are dead. Leaving the Detective Boys playing in another room, Conan leaves the room to go to the bathroom and overhears a suspicious conversation between Aoki and Saki. ......
1044	5	"The Deadly Pork Soup Signal"; Transliteration: "Tonjiru wa Inochigake no Aizu" (Japanese: 豚汁は命がけの合図)	Sumito Sasaki	Akatsuki Yamatoya	May 21, 2022
Conan and Kogoro are passing by an apartment building when they see a police car parked there. In the apartment, a woman who lived alone was found dead. Three fingerprints were found at the scene. The first was a man she was dating. The second belonged to the owner of the store where she worked. The other was not registered. Since there were no signs of prying at the front door or windows, the police began investigating the crime as being committed by a known acquaintance.
1045	6	"The Birthday Party of Divine Punishment (Part 1)"; Transliteration: "Tenbatsu Kudaru Tanjō Pātī (Zenpen)" (Japanese: 天罰くだる誕生パーティー（前編）)	Tsurumi Mukaiyama	N/A	June 4, 2022
Ran, Sonoko, and Sera are invited to a birthday party by their classmate Yumi Sekizawa. Yumi was born on February 16, and her sister, model Reimi Sekizawa, was born on February 15, so the party was a celebration for them. The venue was small but full of celebrities, including models, actors, and TV personalities. There were also Reimi's manager, Kushiyama, Reimi's classmate, Hatsune Tsuguo, a pastry chef, and Hanasaki Mizutoshi, a hair and makeup artist. Conan, who had been invited by Ran to the event, looked unhappy. He had been suffering from mouth ulcers for several days, making it difficult for him to speak. Conan takes out a pill case to take some medicine before the party starts, but he hastily hides it when he realizes that Sera is peeping at him. He hastily hides it when he realizes that Sera is peeping at him. It contains the APTX4869 antidote that Haibara had given him on the school trip. Meanwhile, Sera, having confirmed the presence of the antidote, contacts Mary and tells her about .......
1046	7	"The Birthday Party of Divine Punishment (Part 2)"; Transliteration: "Tenbatsu Kudaru Tanjō Pātī (Kōhen)" (Japanese: 天罰くだる誕生パーティー（後編）)	Akira Yoshimura	N/A	June 11, 2022
Conan has come to the birthday party of Yumi Sekizawa, a classmate of Ran, Sonoko, and Sera, and her sister Reimi Sekizawa, a model. During the party, when the lights in the hall go out for a slide show, they hear Mizutoshi Hanasaki, a hair and makeup artist who had been wooing the Sekizawa sisters, suffer. When the lights came back on, Hanasaki's body was there. Moreover, the word "damnation" is written on his forehead. ...... Meanwhile, Sera remembers the day when her mother Mary turned into a child.
1047	8	"The Red Sheep's Eerie Game (Part 1)"; Transliteration: "Akai Hitsuji no Bukimina Gēmu (Zenpen)" (Japanese: 赤いヒツジの不気味なゲーム（前編）)	Yōsuke Fujino	Toshimichi Ōkawa	June 18, 2022
A client comes to the Mori Detective Agency asking for help, "My girlfriend has been kidnapped by a red sheep! A client comes to the Mori Detective Agency asking for help. His name is Ryota Beppu. The kidnapped girl is Ami Takigawa, his girlfriend who works with him at a restaurant called "La Mucho". Beppu is threatened: "If you want Ami returned safely, come to Yonehana Park tonight at 12:00 pm by yourself, and do not inform the police. As Conan and Ran looked on, they thought to themselves, "I feel like I've seen this somewhere before. Kogoro and Beppu head to the designated park in the middle of the night and meet Ami, who does not appear to have been kidnapped. They learn that the truth behind the kidnapping is a "red sheep game" that tests the courage and affection of boyfriends and that it is currently popular on SNS. Meanwhile, Conan and Ran, who are both curious about the "red sheep," meet on a night street. As they are talking, they see an eerie figure coming out of the tunnel ahead of them - it is a red sheep in a stuffed animal costume. After the red sheep left with a black Boston bag in its arms, a man was lying on the ground with a kitchen knife stuck in his chest. According to the police who arrived at the scene, the man was Tetsuzaburo Wakabayashi. He was the owner and head chef of La Mucho, the restaurant where Beppu and the others worked, and where Kogoro had been hired. Conan and the others head for La Mucho, thinking that there is a connection to the kidnapping case.
1048	9	"The Red Sheep's Eerie Game (Part 2)"; Transliteration: "Akai Hitsuji no Bukimina Gēmu (Kōhen)" (Japanese: 赤いヒツジの不気味なゲーム（後編）)	Masahiro Takada	Toshimichi Ōkawa	June 25, 2022
While Kogoro is swept up in the investigation of a fake kidnapping case in the "Red Sheep Game" to test his boyfriend's courage and love, Conan and Ran encounter a red sheep in disguise on a night street. After the red sheep leaves, they find the body of Tetsuzaburo Wakabayashi, owner and head chef of the restaurant La Mucho. Conan and his friends, suspecting a connection, visit the restaurant because it is also the workplace of Ami Takigawa and her lover Ryota Beppu, who were involved in a fake kidnapping. There they meet sous-chef Kokichi Mukai, chef Daiki Kamio, and restaurant partner Motojiro Hirasawa. While asking about their alibis and other details, they come across a video of a red sheep escaping from a couple on a date about two weeks ago. While investigating Wakabayashi's home, the police discover a threatening e-mail on his computer. The other party is a red sheep, and the hostage is a woman named Henri. And a ransom of 50 million was demanded. Conan and his friends then interviewed Hideto Iwami, the president of the stuffed animal rental company, and identified the person who rented the red sheep costume. ......
1049	10	"The Threat to Megure's Police Career"; Transliteration: "Megure, Keiji Jinsei no Kiki" (Japanese: 目暮、刑事人生の危機)	Sumito Sasaki	Nobuo Ōgizawa	July 9, 2022
The body of Iwao Yamashita was found in an abandoned factory in Tokyo. Inspector Megure and his team arrive at the scene after receiving an anonymous tip-off, and from the condition of the body, they believe that this was not the place where he was murdered. Meanwhile, an officer from the local police department arrives at Yamashita's home after being unable to contact the family and discovers a safe with the door open in a dilapidated room, and a figurine with bloodstains and hairs lying on the floor. Inspector Megure and his team confirm the scene and begin their investigation, assuming that this is the crime scene. Two days later, a person who has been persistently following the Yamashita department surfaces. When Inspector Megure hears the name of this person, Kyosuke Temukai, he becomes upset. About three years ago, he had spotted Temukata, who was working for the Tokyo Metropolitan Government at the time, in the investigation of a murder case. When asked about his alibi for the incident, he reluctantly revealed that it was a secret meeting with a certain businessman. Although his alibi for the murder was proven, Temukai lost his job when the government found out about his inappropriate relationship with a certain contractor. As a result, he is said to be harboring a recrimination against Inspector Megure. He is now in the publishing business, and it is said that he has a method of approaching socially successful people and having them write and self-publish their autobiographies. One of his targets was Yamashita. Temukai says he has an alibi for the time of the murder, but apparently there are no witnesses. The morning after the murder, he had a self-inflicted car accident that destroyed his own car. Inspector Megure and his team believe that he drove the body from the murder scene and burned it to destroy evidence. Inspector Megure decides to put his own neck on the line and arrest Temukai. ......
1050	11	"Intrigue at Morikawa Mansion (Part 1)"; Transliteration: "Morikawa Goten no Inbō (Zenpen)" (Japanese: 森川御殿の陰謀（前編）)	Minoru Tozawa	Akatsuki Yamatoya	July 16, 2022
Conan and Ran accompany Kogoro to the mansion where he has received a request. The client is Yuyama Morikawa, known as the don of the soft-serve ice cream industry. Yuyama has been diagnosed with cancer and has very little time left to live, and he asked Kogoro to advise him on his inheritance. In the mansion were the owner, Yuyama, three brothers, Yuichiro, Yujiro, and Yousaburo Morikawa, who were candidates for inheritance, Hiroki Oi, a lawyer, and Tomoyoshi Shikatsu, the chief butler. All the three brothers talk about is their inheritance. When Conan goes around the mansion, he sees that each of them is eager to get their hands on the inheritance. They fight constantly, and Tomoka, who has known them since he was a child, seems lonely. At dinner, Yujiro is nowhere to be found among the members gathered in the dining room. The meal begins without Yujiro's arrival, and after dinner, they are informed that the will will be rewritten tomorrow afternoon. The next morning, neither Yujiro nor Yuuzaburo show up at the diner. Suspicious, Conan and his friends go to check their rooms. Yujiro is nowhere to be found, and Yuuzaburo was murdered in a locked room. Kogoro tries to call the police, but is stopped by Oi. ......
1051	12	"Intrigue at Morikawa Mansion (Part 2)"; Transliteration: "Morikawa Goten no Inbō (Kōhen)" (Japanese: 森川御殿の陰謀（後編）)	Yōsuke Fujino	Akatsuki Yamatoya	July 23, 2022
Conan, Ran, and Kogoro arrive at the residence of Yuyama Morikawa, the don of the soft-serve ice cream industry, at his request. Yuyama has cancer and does not have long to live, and he asks Kogoro to identify three brothers who are candidates for inheritance. There, the third son, Yuusaburo Morikawa, is found dead in a locked room. The second son, Yujiro Morikawa, who had been missing since the day before, was also found dead in a tank of soft-serve ice cream as a result of the search. "The next target will be me!" said Yuichiro Morikawa, the eldest son, who is distraught and hides in his room. As Conan and the others return to their room to discuss the case, a gunshot rings out in the house. They rush to the house and find Yuichiro's body. Conan heads in the direction of the gunfire and runs into Tomoka Tsukasa, the chief butler. The two head for the storage room, where they find an eye-full believed to have taken Yuichiro's life. After checking the scene, Conan realizes something.......
1052	13	"The Detective Boys' Test of Courage"; Transliteration: "Shōnen Tantei-dan no Kan Tameshi" (Japanese: 少年探偵団の肝試し)	Kōichirō Kuroda	Tatsurō Inamoto	July 30, 2022
Conan was at Dr. Agasa's house with the members of the Detective Boys. They were watching a webcast psychic delivery of "Softie Sadao and Scaredy-cat Toshiko Visit Haunted Locations! Ayumi, Mitsuhiko, and Genta are fascinated by the video. Conan and Haibara are excited to go with them and say, "Let's go take pictures of ghosts at haunted places! Conan and Haibara accompany the excited three to an abandoned hospital. They start filming with the goal of finding the "Open Room" on the top three floors, where the ghosts dwell. It is said to be haunted by ghosts such as a "baby red devil," a "bandaged man in a wheelchair," and a "female doctor with long black hair. Conan and his friends hear a baby crying in the hospital, as rumored, and head there, only to find a cat. While they are about to move on, Conan is the only one who feels something strange about the cat, saying, "This is what ghosts are really like. The five then headed upstairs.......
1053	14	"The Spark That Fell on the Ranch (Part 1)"; Transliteration: "Bokujō ni Ochita Hidane (Zenpen)" (Japanese: 牧場に墜ちた火種（前編）)	Tsurumi Mukaiyama	N/A	August 6, 2022
Conan, Ayumi, Mitsuhiko, Genta, and Haibara were on their way to Hatoyama Farm by bus with their homeroom teacher Sumiko Kobayashi and assistant homeroom teacher Rumi Wakasa. They were to be given new chickens to take care of at school. Also on the bus were Junya Hizuka, Takashi Minami, and Shogo Kano, who were going to the same ranch for interviews and research. However, they seemed to be on bad terms. Ayumi and Mitsuhiko are interested in a video Kano was watching on his smartphone. Mitsuhiko took a picture of it with his own smartphone, and when he tried to find out more about Kano's work, he got into trouble. He was saved by a fellow passenger, Toru Amuro. Amuro also seemed to have something to do at the ranch, so he went to ....... Conan and his friends arrive at the ranch, but it is deserted. It seems that they were preparing to close the ranch to make it part of a golf course. Conan and his friends decide to go check out the chickens they are looking for until the rancher shows up. However, there were no chickens on the poultry farm. There was a large hole in the wall, and the chickens had apparently escaped through it. They decide to take a restroom break before looking for the chickens, but then Ayumi disappears.
1054	15	"The Spark That Fell on the Ranch (Part 2)"; Transliteration: "Bokujō ni Ochita Hidane (Kōhen)" (Japanese: 牧場に墜ちた火種（後編）)	Kitagojo	N/A	August 13, 2022
Conan, Ayumi, Mitsuhiko, Genta, Haibara, homeroom teacher Sumiko Kobayashi, and assistant homeroom teacher Rumi Wakasa meet Amuro on the bus heading to Hatoyama Farm. Also on the bus were Junya Hizuka, Takashi Minami, and Shogo Kano, who seemed to have some purpose in mind. While Conan and his friends are spending time at the ranch, Kaisuke Hatoyama, who claims to be the rancher's brother, appears before them. Kaisuke takes Ayumi hostage, and Conan, Amuro, Mitsuhiko, and Kobayashi are locked in the basement of the office. There they find the body of the rancher, Gisuke Hatoyama, and Yuya Kazami. Conan succeeds in contacting Haibara and the others who remained above ground, but then the three passengers on the bus and Kaisuke arrive. What is their intention?
1055	16	"The Ghost's Revenge"; Transliteration: "Yūrei ni Natte Fukushū o" (Japanese: 幽霊になって復讐を)	Masahiro Takada	Nobuo Ōgizawa	September 3, 2022
Conan and Kogoro met Takayuki Katsuro, an accounting firm manager, his wife Sayaka Katsuro, and his secretary Ken Makinoura at the hospital. Takayuki had been diagnosed with only six months to live, but he seemed to be trying to live his remaining time to the fullest. A few days later, however, he is found murdered in his home. That morning, Sayaka and Makira went out to run an errand for Takayuki. When they returned home in the evening, they found Takayuki in the bathroom with his wrists slit. It seemed under the circumstances that he might have cut his own hand, but Sayaka and Maki-ura, as well as Conan and the others, believed that he was not the kind of person who would do such a thing because he was suffering from an illness. Then Takayuki's friend Yoji Kanda arrives. He had been contacted by Takayuki last night and told to come to his home. In that call, Takayuki mentioned that he was feeling resentful toward someone, and Kanda said that there must have been some kind of trouble. While the case was being investigated as a case, a rumor spread throughout the town that "Katsuro's ghost appeared!" was spreading throughout the town. In addition, a real estate agent, Shoto Oshikawa, emerges as a suspect. ......
1056	17	"Wanting to Bring That Person Back"; Transliteration: "Ano Hito o Torimodoshitai" (Japanese: あの人を取り戻したい)	Sumito Sasaki	Nobuo Ōgizawa	September 17, 2022
Conan and Kogoro see a news report on TV that Daijiro Butsumaru, the victim of a traffic accident, has disappeared. A woman, Fusae Mori, who witnessed the accident while out for a walk, reports it to the police with Futsumaru's driver's license, but it seems that the assailant, Hajime Inukai, has gone missing, saying that he is taking Futsumaru to the hospital. Meanwhile, the Mori Detective Agency receives a phone call. It was from Futsumaru's wife, Shoko Futsumaru. Conan and Kogoro head for the home, where they are greeted by Shinko and her secretary, Shinya Kadokura. Their request was to "find my husband and bring him back safely. Then they receive a phone call. The caller says, "I want you to buy Butsumaru's body for 10 million yen. Conan feels uncomfortable when he sees the two men willing to pay 10 million yen without informing the police as the murderer demanded.
1057	18	"Bad Guys"; Transliteration: "Warui Yatsura" (Japanese: わるいやつら)	Minoru Tozawa	Yoshio Urasawa	September 24, 2022
Conan is on his way to the park with Genta and Mitsuhiko when he hears two women screaming. They head for the house where they heard the voices and find Kaoru Hirasawa and Seiko Hirasawa lying on the floor after falling down the stairs. From a conversation with Ryoji Hirasawa, who came later, they are his wife and mother-in-law, and Ryoji is the son-in-law of the family. It seems that they are just trying to get Ryoji in trouble. Later, Conan and the others see Ryoji struggling near the park as well. Ayumi says that there is a lot of talk about the Hirasawa family in the neighborhood. ......
1058	19	"The Man Who Camped Out at the Police Station"; Transliteration: "Keisatsu ni Isuwatta Otoko" (Japanese: 警察に居座った男)	Yōsuke Fujino	Nobuo Ōgizawa	October 1, 2022
Kogoro sees Inspector Megure walking in front of Cafe Poirot. He congratulates him on speedily solving a recent case, but apparently it was a false arrest. Conan joins him, and the two ask Inspector Megure about the case. Shuhei Odawara, the landlord of a private house, is found dead. There were marks on his neck and head as if he had been strangled and beaten, respectively, and a rope and iron pipe were found at the scene. The police believe that "the murderer broke a windowpane, knocked him out, and strangled him to death with an iron pipe. Furthermore, according to the testimony of his girlfriend, Tomoko Yaguchi, her ex-boyfriend, Yosuke Kagetsu, emerged as the murderer. Inspector Megure and his team went to talk to Kouzuki. There, he admits to the murder of Odawara, saying, "I was just about to turn myself in. The case seems to be speedily solved, but...
1059	20	"Yoko Okino and the Locked Attic (Part 1)"; Transliteration: "Okino Yōko to Yaneura no Misshitsu (Zenpen)" (Japanese: 沖野ヨーコと屋根裏の密室(前編))	Tsurumi Mukaiyama	N/A	October 8, 2022
Yoko Okino comes to the Mori Detective Agency and asks to solve a case at a villa. A few days earlier, Yoko and a producer from Nippei TV went to the villa where her sister had disappeared after she got married, and Yoko went with him for location scouting. Yoko and her sister's husband, her brother and his wife were also there. They decided to stay at the villa that night ....... Kogoro was about to share his theory when he had to go to the bathroom. Then Kennori Wakita of "Iroha Sushi" showed up.
1060	21	"Yoko Okino and the Locked Attic (Part 2)"; Transliteration: "Okino Yōko to Yaneura no Misshitsu (Kōhen)" (Japanese: 沖野ヨーコと屋根裏の密室(後編))	Akira Yoshimura	N/A	October 15, 2022
Yoko Okino comes to the Mouri Detective Agency and talks about an incident that happened at a villa. Instead of Kogoro, who is holed up in the bathroom and does not come out, Kennori Wakita of Iroha Sushi and Conan are assigned to the case. Producer Wanya Fuejima of Nippei TV, who was at the villa with Yoko at the time, informs them of a sister, Baba Houka, who disappeared several years ago and is believed to be related to the case. Houka's husband, Baba Kankou, Kankou's younger brother, Baba Fugo, and his wife, Baba Himi, were childhood friends who had been together with Houka for a long time. Hoka was Kankou's wife, Fengo's first love, and Himi's best friend. It was two summers ago that she disappeared. Each couple was supposed to go to the villa to join the others for a summer vacation, but Nankang had urgent business and Hoka was supposed to arrive at the villa alone first. However, when the remaining three arrived at the villa, she was nowhere to be found, and they called the police to search for her, but were unable to find her. If Nanko, who was to be murdered in this case, had anything to do with the disappearance, then everyone but Yoko would have a motive. As he was reasoning with Yoko, asking her what she was wondering about, Conan's smartphone received a call from Kogoro, who was supposed to be in the restroom, and ......?
1061	22	"Police Academy Arc Wild Police Story CASE. Hiromitsu Morofushi"; Transliteration: "Keisatsu Gakkō-hen Wairudo Porīsu Sutōrī Kēsu. Morofushi Hiromitsu" (Japanese: 警察学校編 Wild Police Story CASE. 諸伏景光)	Yasuichirō Yamamoto	N/A	October 29, 2022
Morobushi runs up the stairs of his house, which is engulfed in flames, as Furuya, Hagiwara, Date, and Matsuda try to stop him--! The story goes back three hours earlier. The five had been caught by Onizuka, the instructor, and ordered to clean the bathtub. While they were cleaning the bathtub, they saw the information on the copier about the girl who was reported missing last night. Morobushi had seen the girl in town and had received a picture of her. The topic naturally came up during the cleaning, but Morobushi was reluctant to go into details, saying only that she looked just like a girl he used to play with as a child. Morobushi was afraid that someone else might get involved, but the four of them all said in unison, "We're not going to die!" Morobushi was encouraged by their words. Encouraged by this, Morobushi began to talk about an incident he had encountered in the past. Fifteen years ago, Morobushi was having dinner with his father and mother when he heard the intercom ringing repeatedly. The man who visited them seemed to be an acquaintance of his father's. At first they heard him talking peacefully, but gradually the atmosphere became disturbing. The mother went to check on him, and when she returned, she told Morobushi to hide in a closet. What Morobushi sensed in the closet was the smell of iron, the strange words of the murderer, and a tattoo on his shoulder that looked like a goblet.
1062	23	"The Spiral of Rain and Malice"; Transliteration: "Ame to Akui no Supairaru" (Japanese: 雨と悪意のスパイラル)	Masahiro Takada	Jun'ichi Miyashita	November 5, 2022
Conan, Haibara, Ayumi, Mitsuhiko, and Genta found an abandoned car on the riverbank. Although they complain about the insanity of the situation, rain is forecast for the evening, so the five of them decide to rush off to play. Conan and his friends begin to play soccer, but Genta almost hits a woman on a nearby bench. She is Tamaki Onda, a representative of a design company. She is fidgety and blurts out her voice into the voice recorder, but after talking to Genta, she shows them some spectacular lifting. They became good friends through soccer, which they used to play in college, but then they heard the sound of thunder as predicted. Conan and his friends leave Tamaki, who seems to be waiting for someone, and go back to their homes. The next day, Conan sees a news report that "Tamaki's body was found in a car abandoned on a riverside. Conan rushes to the riverside, where he finds the four of them already there. Conan and his friends find Detectives Takagi and Chiba near the abandoned car, and go to talk to them about what happened yesterday. Since it was pouring, there were no witnesses at the time of the incident. Meanwhile, Conan becomes concerned about Ryuji Koyabu, who looks thoughtful among the onlookers. Conan heads to the delivery company where he works and finds Koyabu grabbing at his boss. According to Detective Takagi and the others who came to stop him, Koyabu has a criminal record and his fingerprints were found on Tamaki's glasses. In addition, Yurina Kinosaki, a subordinate of Tamaki's, also surfaced from the earrings Tamaki was clutching. However, both of them seem to have alibis for the estimated time of death. ......
1063	24	"The Targeted Chicken Sexer " Transliteration: "Nerawa Reta Hiyoko Kantei-shi" (Japanese: 狙われたひよこ鑑定士)	Minoru Tozawa	Akatsuki Yamatoya	November 12, 2022
Conan, Ran, and Kogoro arrive at the Kusano Chicken Egg Factory. Hitoshi Namba, the national champion of firstborn chick identifiers, a.k.a. chick appraisers, came to Kogoro for advice, saying, "Strange things have been happening for the past few weeks. The contents were all strange: a rubbery cannonball flying at him while he was walking, a magnifying glass scorching his hand from a distance while he was dozing off, a smartphone exploding, and so on. Kogoro had no idea who was being targeted, so he was assigned to investigate the cause and to act as Namba's bodyguard. When he goes to talk to the people at the factory, Saburo Kusano, the president, says that he has the best track record and personality, and that it is unthinkable that anyone would target him, but his colleague Takashi Nakamura, a Hatsumei Hina identification specialist, replies with the implication that he has a good outward appearance ....... Introduced by Mamiko Hirasawa, an accountant, he is asked to talk to Kazumasa Kitazawa, a magazine reporter, where the topic of industry legend Yuji Okabe comes up. Compared to Okabe's spectacular record, Namba is apparently regarded as "not bad at all, but not even close to Okabe at his peak. Conan, Ran, and Kogoro, who had accompanied Namba to the afternoon lecture as his bodyguards, witnessed the actual scene where Namba was targeted. ......
1064	25	"The Dreamy-Eyed Woman's Last Shot at Love"; Transliteration: "Yumemiru Kifujin, Saigo no Koi" (Japanese: 夢見る貴婦人、最後の恋)	Kōichirō Kuroda	Tatsurō Inamoto	November 19, 2022
Conan, Ran and Sonoko arrive at the trendiest dating spot. They find an old woman, Hal Kamogawa, sitting on a bench with an anxious look on her face, and try to talk to her to see if she is lost. Then a man arrives. Conan and his friends think he is Hal's son from his appearance, but he, Joji Kazama, says he is her lover. Sonoko, seeing that Hal is a very wealthy woman, considers the possibility that Kazama, who is as old as her son, approached her for her money, and tries to give her some advice, but she is given the cold shoulder. When Sonoko gets angry and says, "I'm sure he's going to try to swindle you out of a lot of money for the sake of his daughter who has an incurable disease," Kazama turns sad and ....... As the conversation went on, he introduced his daughter, Yuki Kazama. She has a heart condition that is one in a million, and she seems to be concerned about the future of her father, Kazama. Hal vows to make them both happy, and Ran and Sonoko are filled with emotion. Hal and Kazama drive away to give her money for her treatment. They see them off and it seems like a happy ending, but there is something that is bugging Conan. ......
1065	26	"Detectives Don't Sleep"; Transliteration: "Tantei wa Nemuranai" (Japanese: 探偵は眠らない)	Tsurumi Mukaiyama	Nobuo Ōgizawa	November 26, 2022
A woman, Kae Nishiwaki, comes to the Mori Detective Agency where Conan and Kogoro are. She came to ask Kogoro for help, saying that someone had broken into her room while she was at work. The intruder, who appeared about a month ago, is not a burglar, but is said to leave gifts in the room. She came to Kogoro's office because she thought the police would not believe her story because of its strangeness. Conan and Kogoro arrive at Kae's apartment and find a trunk with a ribbon on the front door. Thinking it was a new present from the intruder, Kogoro opened it and found the body of Ryuko Kusakabe, bleeding from the head, stuffed inside. ...... Kae's immediate boss, Ryuko, has a strict attitude, and Kae is not very good at her job. Kogoro deduces that the intruder tried to tell her, "I took care of the person you hate and resent" by presenting her body. Inspector Megure and his team search Kae's room and find a wiretap, which reveals that the intruder had obtained information from the room. Since the room was always broken into on Thursdays, there is a possibility that the place where he works is closed on Thursdays. Furthermore, a figure was seen carrying a large trunk from the parking lot late last night. However, it was not midnight when the trunk was brought into the room. Where on earth had it been hidden until then? Then, the name of Hisashi Kujukyu, a resident of the apartment building, surfaced. ......
1066	27	"Till Death Do Us Part"; Transliteration: "Shi ga Futari o Wakatsu Made" (Japanese: 死が二人を分かつまで)	Akira Yoshimura	Akatsuki Yamatoya	December 3, 2022
Conan and Kogoro were attending the wedding of Shinpo Yokoyama and Sayoko Imamura. They met the groom's father, Mitsuteru Yokoyama, at Kogoro's favorite bar, and in the excitement of the occasion, they were invited to the wedding. At the venue were the wedding planner, Hiroko Nagashima, the pastor, Harutoshi Alex Kawasu, and other staff members, as well as Takehito Yamada, a close friend of Shinobu's, and Sayoko's friends. The wedding ceremony began, but just as Sayoko entered the chapel, she suddenly began to suffer and died. Sayoko's friend Naho Mizuguchi and other people in the hall say disturbing words such as, "Of course she suffered" and "She was cursed." Sayoko suffered no external injuries, and the cause of death was poisoning. It is said that even a small amount of a poisonous mushroom can paralyze the entire body and kill a person in about an hour. Conan and the others begin to investigate what Sayoko had eaten and who gave it to her.
1067	28	"The Shopping Center in Love"; Transliteration: "Koisuru Shōten Machi" (Japanese: 恋する商店街)	Taiki Nishimura	Yoshio Urasawa	December 24, 2022
Conan and Kogoro pass by the desolate Bundo Shopping Arcade on a back street. They decide to shop at a grocery store they see called "Yaokyoshi," but the owner, Yoshinobu Yamazaki, seems to be in low spirits. Then Madame Gaga, a "producer who revitalizes run-down shopping arcades," and her assistant, Rabbit Suzuki, arrive on the scene. Madame Gaga calls out, "Let's hold a wrestling tournament to revive the shopping arcade! to revitalize the shopping arcade. The shopkeepers in the shopping arcade train their bodies in various ways, and Kogoro joins in as a referee. Under the direction of Madame and Rabbit, preparations for the wrestling tournament are steadily underway. Conan, who had come to watch the event with Ran, is concerned about something.
1068	29	"Mitsuhiko Tsuburaya's Detective Notes"; Transliteration: "Tsuburaya Mitsuhiko no Tantei Nōto" (Japanese: 円谷光彦の探偵ノート)	Yōsuke Fujino	Chisato Matsuda	January 7, 2023
Conan, Haibara, Ayumi, Genta, and Mitsuhiko come to "Maxima's Pizza," a pizza shop specializing in take-out. They participate in a campaign to guess the size of the pizza dough, and thanks to Genta's efforts, they get a piece of pizza. The pizzas are divided into five equal portions, placed in a special box, and Conan and his friends head home. On their way home, someone steals all the pizzas! When Conan and his friends gathered again, they were holding a box of battered pizzas. The contents were safe, but the special box had been left a short distance away with scratches on it. Conan and Mitsuhiko realize that the culprit's target is the box from the way it is scratched. As they head back to the pizza shop, they see a police car parked in front of the store, and Detectives Takagi and Chiba. Apparently, a nearby jewelry store has been robbed, and they are canvassing the area. The pizza shop seems to have nothing to do with the robbery, but the route of escape and the stolen items lead Conan and his friends to the criminals' goal. ......
1069	30	"The Sweet Voice Heard Through the Phone"; Transliteration: "Juwaki Goshi no Suīto Boisu" (Japanese: 受話器ごしのスウィートボイス)	Tsurumi Mukaiyama	Toshimichi Ōkawa	January 14, 2023
The Mori Detective Agency receives a call from a client, Mayako Nagamine. Mayako was supposed to come to the office, but she seems to be lost. It was past the scheduled time, but Kogoro was thrilled, knowing that Mayako is a beautiful woman after checking her photo on Instagram. Mayako married Haruhiko Nagamine, her boss at work, a year ago. She is now a full-time housewife. Listening to the phone call, Conan assumed that he was supposed to investigate Haruhiko, who is constantly rumored to be having an affair. However, she was told that the request was to investigate Haruhiko's possible involvement in a crime. Mayako saw Haruhiko bring in a suitcase in the middle of the night and hide it in the garage. She tried to check inside, but was unable to open it because it was locked, and the fact that it was unnaturally heavy made her suspicious. When Kogoro receives another call, he is told by Mayako, who is on her way here, that Haruhiko is following him. Conan and Kogoro confirm that it is Mayako, and head for the place where she is said to have run away to help her.......
1070	31	"The Surprise That Leads to Tragedy"; Transliteration: "Sapuraizu wa Higeki no Hajimari" (Japanese: サプライズは悲劇のはじまり)	Akira Yoshimura	Tatsurō Inamoto	January 21, 2023
Conan, Ayumi, Mitsuhiko, and Genta were at the apartment of a friend of Dr. Agasa's when they heard a scream on their way home. They rush to the scene to find a man and two women lying on the floor, bleeding from the head. The woman who owned the house, coming home from work, sensed something strange in the room and picked up a golf club for self-defense. No lights were on, and as she proceeded through the darkness, she heard a loud noise ....... The police confirm that it was as described in the statement and consider it an unfortunate accident. However, Conan has some concerns .......
1071	32	"Yusaku Kudo's Detective Show (Part 1)"; Transliteration: "Kudō Yūsaku no Suiri Shō (Zenpen)" (Japanese: 工藤優作の推理ショー（前編）)	Masahiro Takada	N/A	January 28, 2023
Yusaku is asked to solve a series of locked room murders in a TV show but suddenly falls ill to food poisoning on the day of the broadcast. Yukiko, his wife, disguises herself, takes his place, and reviews the details of the crimes with Conan. Yukiko falls ill as well, and someone disguised as Yusako arrives at the manor. Believing it is Kid (who wants to repay Yusako for clearing his name when he was falsely accused of crimes he did not commit), Conan enlists him with the case. They are interviewed by reporter Saiko Yumekawa. The victims, Atsumi Morita (whose best friend is Saiko who lead the discovery of Atsumi's corpse), Taiji Kiryuu (the only victim who put up a fight and has the culprit’s skin under his nails), and Koretsugu Kanzawa were all murdered differently in various parts of town, in different age groups, and didn’t appear to know one another. The only thing linking all three together is the fact they are fans of a popular MMRPG called Dungeon Holmes, they were found in a messy locked room and the door handles were the same. Yusaku says it’s a coincidence, but Conan believes a serial killer is responsible for the murders.
1072	33	"Yusaku Kudo's Detective Show (Part 2)"; Transliteration: "Kudō Yūsaku no Suiri Shō (Kōhen)" (Japanese: 工藤優作の推理ショー（後編）)	Minoru Tozawa	N/A	February 4, 2023
Conan, using Yusako’s voice, reveals the murders were all committed by one individual using the same method. After killing the victims, the culprit locked the door using a bag and long items, then ransacked the scene to disguise the trick being utilized. All three victims knew their killer through the Dungeon Holmes game, revealing Saiko, who also plays the game, to be the serial killer, much to the shock of the TV staff and everyone viewing at home. Thorough and cunning, yet evil and calculating, Saiko made various errors and mistakes in her plans (not ransacking the top shelf at Atsumi's crime scene indicating the murderer to be of short stature and the placement of chopsticks in Taiji's murder: they were on the left side of the cup, even though the victim was right-handed, indicating that the culprit was left-handed. As evidence, Taiji (the second victim) sprung back to life having been knocked out with a stun gun and valiantly attempted to fight Saiko off, scratching her left wrist in the process, thereby having Saiki’s skin under his nails, causing her to hide the mark with the wristwatch. Saiko confesses, revealing she came up with the trick and asked her gaming friends to test it out. Atsumi tested it and uploaded it as her own work. Saiko confronts her and demands she take it down, but killed her in a fit of rage. She went on and murdered the others as they may discover the trick and naturally become suspicious of her. Saiko could have refused to do the broadcast but wanted to see if she could fool Yusako to get rid of her paranoia of getting caught for her crimes, but ultimately failed. As Saiko is arrested, Inspector Nakamori announces on it TV that he is on Kid’s trail. This contradicts Conan’s first thought and Yusako, having fled the scene already, is reveal to be Vermouth who is investigating the process of the Black Originization's plan of killing Shinichi's parents as Yusaku is deemed a threat to their group. Yusaku and Yukiko are fine, having faked the illness after seeing through their plans.
1073	34	"The Detective Boys' Pursuit of the Purse-snatcher"; Transliteration: "Tantei-dan no Hittakuri dai Tsuiseki" (Japanese: 探偵団の引ったくり大追跡)	Masahiro Takada	Nobuo Ōgizawa	February 11, 2023
On a main street outside of town, Ayumi sees a man running frantically. The man has long hair, wears a red jumper, a mask and gloves. He is carrying a small black bag in his hand and runs straight into the premises of a large apartment complex. An elderly man, Shosaku Kume, appears from the same direction, shouting "Snatch and grab! and chased after the long-haired man. Ayumi hears from Kume that he has snatched a bag containing 300,000 yen that she had unloaded, and she calls Conan and the others. Conan and his team arrive at the apartment complex, and while they are listening to the story, a body is discovered inside the complex. The victim is Koichi Samura, a resident of Room 301 in Building B. Lying beside him was a red jumper and a small black bag. However, there was no 300,000 yen in the bag, and he did not have long hair like a purse snatcher. He also had one leg in a cast and did not appear to be able to run. Conan searches his room and discovers something. Meanwhile, Inspector Megure, who was investigating the case, receives a call that a man's body has been found with a wallet and 300,000 yen that are believed to belong to Kume. The man, Katsumi Togane, who had died after consuming poison at a tavern, was apparently a fellow bad guy with Samura. It is thought that he may have killed Samura in a struggle during a snatch-and-grab and drank the poison himself in a fit of desperation. After seeing Kume off with the money back, the case seems to be safely closed, but Conan has something on his mind. ......
1074	35	"The Boiled Fugu Mystery Tour Showdown (Mojiko & Kokura Part)"; Transliteration: "Tetchiri Taiketsu Misuterī Tsuā (Monjikō Kokura-hen)" (Japanese: てっちり対決ミステリーツアー（門司港・小倉編）)	Minoru Tozawa	Akatsuki Yamatoya	February 18, 2023
Conan, Ran, and Kogoro come to Shimonoseki by way of an introduction from attorney Hiroki Oi, whom they met in a past inheritance case. The clients this time are Makoto Izumiya, the fourth generation owner of the long-established fugu restaurant "Izumiya," which has been in business for over 100 years, and his daughter Kaede Izumiya. They say that the burglar broke into their house during the busiest time of the day when the restaurant is busiest and there is no one in the house. Without paying attention to the money or goods, what the burglar stole from the safe was a pot. The pots and pans were all made by the same artist, and each of them could have cost several million dollars, but what was important to them was "the broth from the skin of the pot, which has soaked up the flavor of the pot since its establishment. The theft was a big blow to Izumiya, who was about to compete in the finals of a national event called "Tekchiri GP" in the near future. Oi's investigation narrowed down the list of potential suspects to four. One is Ko Kobayashi, a restaurant worker who was caught stealing from Izumiya two years ago; Shinichi Fujii, owner of the Japanese restaurant chain KAN, who had tried to buy Izumiya in the past; Satoru Oehara, owner-chef of the restaurant King Arthur in Moji; and Keisuke Ban, a former employee of Izumiya who knows about the existence of the nabe. Keisuke Ban, a former employee of "Izumiya" who knows about the existence of the nabe. They all seem to have alibis. Will the culprit really .......
1075	36	"The Boiled Fugu Mystery Tour Showdown (Shimonoseki Part)"; Transliteration: "Tetchiri Taiketsu Misuterī Tsuā (Shimonoseki-hen)" (Japanese: てっちり対決ミステリーツアー（下関編）)	Yōsuke Fujino	Akatsuki Yamatoya	February 25, 2023
Conan, Ran, and Kogoro visit Izumitani, a traditional fugu (blowfish) restaurant in Shimonoseki, through the introduction of attorney Hiroki Ooi. They are asked by the fourth generation owner, Makoto Izumiya, and his daughter, Kaede Izumiya, to recover an heirloom pot that was stolen by a burglar. As they continue their investigation, they come into contact with a suspicious person following Conan and his friends in the night. When Kogoro is left alone, he is attacked and told not to get involved in the case any further. The potential suspects interviewed in the investigation: Yasushi Kobayashi, a restaurant worker; Shinichi Fujii, the owner of the Japanese restaurant chain "Kan"; Satoru Oehara, the owner-chef of the restaurant "King Arthur" in Moji; and Keisuke Ban, a former employee of "Izumiya". Are any of these four culprits involved? Conan and his friends go back to their respective restaurants to talk to them again and taste their prized dishes. Meanwhile, Ooi informs them that Kobayashi, whose alibi has been destroyed, is trying to escape. ......
1076	37	"The Charismatic CEO's Secret Plan"; Transliteration: "Karisuma Shachō no Gokuhi Keikaku" (Japanese: カリスマ社長の極秘計画)	Tsurumi Mukaiyama	Nobuo Ōgizawa	March 4, 2023
Conan and Kogoro find a body downtown. It appears that he was killed by a blow to the head with a pipe, and a dying message was left on the road surface. Conan and his friends visit the apartment where the victim lived, and are told by the caretaker that he said he would pay the rent that had accumulated tomorrow. Furthermore, the presence of Utagawa Sogyo's president emerges from a response to a weekly magazine the caretaker was reading that day. The possibility that he was involved in the incident by trying to extort him came up and .......
SP (Note: Even though all previous episodes from Police Academy Arc Wild Police Story were officially included in total episode count, this episode was skipped and is therefore regarded as a special.)	38	"Police Academy Arc Wild Police Story CASE. Rei Furuya"; Transliteration: "Keisatsu Gakkō-hen Wairudo Porīsu Sutōrī Kēsu. Furuya Rei" (Japanese: 警察学校編 Wild Police Story CASE. 降谷零)	Yasuichirō Yamamoto	N/A	March 11, 2023
While Furuya was getting ready in his room, Morofushi, who was about to leave, came to him. As they were talking, Matsuda joined them and they decided to go out to a convenience store. Hagiwara and Date greet them with a look of dismay as the three of them take it easy before an important ceremony. Today, the graduation ceremony of the police academy where Furuya, Matsuda, Hagiwara, Date, and Morofushi spent their time, was celebrated with many fond memories. Meanwhile, a woman and her friend were touching an RX-7 parked in front of the police academy. Matsuda sees them and unintentionally yells at them. Hagiwara calms him down and pulls him inside the gate, as Matsuda had just repaired a scratch he sustained in an incident the five of them had encountered. As Date and Morofushi hurriedly followed, Furuya told the women that if they were interested in becoming police officers, they should observe the graduation ceremony. After their graduation, the five walk off into their own tomorrows.
1077	39	"The Black Organization's Scheme (Hunt)"; Transliteration: "Kuro-zukume no Bōryaku (Kari)" (Japanese: 黒ずくめの謀略（狩り）)	Minoru Tozawa	N/A	March 25, 2023
For several days, pairs of unidentified foreigners have been turning up dead. While discussing the case on their way home from school, Conan, Genta, Mitsuhiko, Ayumi, and Haibara come across a foreigner who has fallen off a building. When Conan sees Vodka on the roof, he instructs Haibara to take the three kids and leave the scene. Conan discovers an FBI ID and phone displaying a coded message on the fallen foreigner and heads to the Kudo family home, where he finds a gathering of FBI agents.
1078	40	"The Black Organization's Scheme (Landing)"; Transliteration: "Kuro-zukume no Bōryaku (Jōriku)" (Japanese: 黒ずくめの謀略（上陸）)	Nobuharu Kamanaka	N/A	April 1, 2023
For several days, the Black Organization has been killing FBI agents. Conan and the FBI deduce that the Organization must be deciphering the FBI's coded messages, so they decide to use it against them by laying a trap for them. Supposedly dead Camel and Mark, the older brother of a killed agent, are chosen to go to the meeting location. However, no one arrives at the location indicated by the code, and shots are fired on the agents keeping watch.
1079	41	"The Black Organization's Scheme (Identity)"; Transliteration: "Kuro-zukume no Bōryaku (Shōtai)" (Japanese: 黒ずくめの謀略（正体）)	Yasuichirō Yamamoto	N/A	April 8, 2023
Cornered by the Black Organization the FBI were trying to trap, Camel drives his car into the ocean. He manages to escape to Umizaru Island, where he warms up at the campsite. However, his location is given away when they spot his fire. The Black Organization arrives on the island in order to kill Camel and get a look at his face. In order to evade them, Camel acquires coffee bean bags and straws from the cafe on the island as instructed by Akai, but...how will the Black Organization's battle against the FBI over Agent Camel end?!
