= Case Closed season 33 =

Season of television series

Case Closed
- Season 33
- Cover of the first DVD box set of season 33 by Shogakukan and B Zone.
- No. of episodes: 143

Release
- Original network: NNS (ytv)
- Original release: April 15, 2023 – present

Season chronology
- ← Previous; Season 32

The thirty-third season of the Case Closed anime was directed by Yasuichirō Yamamoto and Nobuharu Kamanaka, and produced by TMS Entertainment and Yomiuri Telecasting Corporation. The series is based on Gosho Aoyama's Case Closed manga series. In Japan, the series is titled Meitantei Conan (名探偵コナン, lit. Great Detective Conan, officially translated as Detective Conan) but was changed due to legal issues with the title Detective Conan. The series focuses on the adventures of teenage detective Shinichi Kudo who was turned into a child by a poison called APTX 4869, but continues working as a detective under the alias Conan Edogawa.

The episodes use eleven pieces of theme music: six openings and eight endings. The first ending theme is Kuufuku (starring VALSHE) (クウフク, Kuufuku) by Konya, Anomachikara used for episodes 1074–1087. The first opening theme is RAISE INSIGHT by WANDS used for episodes 1077–1101. The second ending theme is ...and Rescue Me by Rainy。 used for episode 1088–1104. The second opening theme is Unraveling Love ~Sukoshi no Yūki~ (Unraveling Love～少しの勇気～; lit. Unraveling Love ~A Little Courage~) by Mai Kuraki used for episodes 1102–1147. The third ending theme is You & I by Mai Kuraki used for episodes 1105–1131. The fourth ending theme is Yume de Aimashō (夢で逢いましょう; lit. "Let's Meet in Our Dreams") by SARD UNDERGROUND used for episodes 1132–1147. The third opening theme is But No Love (But ノーラヴ) by Rainy。used from episodes 1148–1167. The fourth opening theme is titled Poker Face by Amyuri, used from episodes 1168–1186. The fifth ending theme is Shooting Star by WANDS used for episodes 1148–1157. The sixth ending theme is Fun! Fun! Fun! by Leon Niihama used from episodes 1158–1186. For episode 1187, the special opening theme was titled Mune ga Doki Doki by The High-Lows while the special ending theme was titled Step by Step by Ziggy. The fifth opening theme is titled Heaven Knows, by B'z used from episodes 1188–1205. The seventh ending theme is titled TOWA ~Towa ni Kaze ni Noru~ by Mai Kuraki used from episodes 1188–1202. From episode 1203 onwards, the ending theme is titled 7 Days by Rainy。. From episode 1206 onwards, the opening theme is titled Ai no Fire by Leon Niihama.

The season has been airing since April 15, 2023, on Yomiuri TV, Nippon Television and other NNS stations in Japan. Crunchyroll began simulcasting the series in October 2014, starting with episode 754. In February 2023, episodes of the anime appeared on Tubi with an English dub, starting at episode 965. This is the first time since 2010 that any episodes of the main anime series have been dubbed and released in English.

== Episode list ==
No. overall	No. in season	Title	Directed by	Written by	Original release date
1080	1	"The Cameras Targeting Haibara"; Transliteration: "Haihara o Nerau Kamera" (Japanese: 灰原を狙うカメラ)	Taiki Nishimura	Takeharu Sakurai	April 15, 2023
Ayumi, Genta, and Mitsuhiko invite Conan and Haibara to the Beika department store. They have their sights set on the department store lottery's grand prize, a Hachijo-jima whale watching tour. The professor asks Haibara to withdraw some cash for him, so she heads to the bank's ATM. However, Kogoro arrived just before her, and his card has been swallowed by the machine. On their way to another branch, they spot a suspicious man in a black coat. He appears shocked when he sees Haibara, and then...
1081	2	"My Beloved Dog Pan-kun is a Good Boy"; Transliteration: "Aiken Pan-kun wa Orikō-san" (Japanese: 愛犬パン君はおりこうさん)	Akira Yoshimura	Akatsuki Yamatoya	April 22, 2023
While playing at the park, Conan, Genta, Mitsuhiko, Ayumi, and Haibara hear a dog barking loudly and a woman screaming. They head to the location of the sound, where they find housewife Yamada Sachiko and her beloved dog Pan being attacked by a man wearing a ski mask. Rather than rescuing his owner, Pan flees during the commotion. With help from Conan and the kids, Sachiko escapes danger. Sachiko, who doesn't know why she was attacked, heads home with Pan once he returns, but Conan and the kids are curious about the masked man's goals and decide to investigate.
1082	3	"The Alley of Sad Betrayal"; Transliteration: "Kanashimi no Uragiri Yokochō" (Japanese: 哀しみの裏切り横丁)	Tsurumi Mukaiyama	Asami Ishikawa	April 29, 2023
Conan and Kogoro are enjoying a meal at an Italian bar in an alley while chatting with the owner Yamaura when the wall is suddenly demolished. The culprit is Kusumi, the owner of the alley, who has been harassing shop owners who refuse to vacate the alley. One shop owner even died from the stress. Sushi restaurant owner Fumio and creative cuisine restaurant owner Yonezawa arrive when they hear the commotion, and with their help, they successfully run off Kusumi. But when Kogoro visits the bathroom a while later, he discovers someone inside...
1083	4	"Behind the Scenes of the J League Finals"; Transliteration: "J Rīgu Kessen no Butaiura" (Japanese: Jリーグ決戦の舞台裏)	Minoru Tozawa	Akatsuki Yamatoya	May 13, 2023
Kawasaki Frontale takes on FC Tokyo in the J League 30th anniversary match. Conan and the Detective Boys have fun participating in the special event. However, once the event ends and they return to their seats, for some reason Haibara is in a bad mood. She wanted to enter the pitch holding hands with her favorite player Higo of Big Osaka, but she showed up on the wrong day. Haibara expresses her disappointment over her team's loss and Sanada's poor play... only to realize Sanada is standing right next to her! While watching the match together, Haibara notices something odd in the stands.
1084	5	"The Freezing Cold Men"; Transliteration: "Hie Kitta Otokotachi" (Japanese: 冷え切った男達)	Yōsuke Fujino	Tatsurō Inamoto	May 20, 2023
Conan, Ran, and Kogoro encounter some men arguing at the hospital. They are Ryoichi and Reiji, the sons of Kenzo, president of Aizawa foods, and senior executive director Bando. Kenzo, who is inside the treatment room, is the cause of their argument. The three men begin telling Kogoro about the circumstances when Kenzo collapsed in the refrigerated warehouse when the doctor finishes treating Kenzo. Kenzo, who is now awake, tells the others that he simply fell asleep from exhaustion. However, Conan senses there is something off about Kenzo's words and behavior.
1085	6	"The Unlucky Matchmaking (Part 1)"; Transliteration: "Fukitsuna Enmusubi (Zenpen)" (Japanese: 不吉な縁結び（前編）)	Taiki Nishimura	N/A	June 3, 2023
Kazuha is visiting Tokyo, and Conan and Ran join her on a trip to Haido Shrine, which is said to provide matchmaking benefits. Because today is a lucky day, the shrine grounds are crowded with people. Ran, who wasn't aware the shrine was a popular spot, asks Kazuha how she learned about it. She apparently learned about the shrine through Heiji when she happened to see him looking it up on his phone. Based on his recent behavior, Conan realizes Heiji must be here as well and goes after the suspicious man wearing a fox man he spots. Meanwhile, Kazuha notices someone in the crowd who doesn't seem interested in matchmaking...
1086	7	"The Unlucky Matchmaking (Part 2)"; Transliteration: "Fukitsuna Enmusubi (Kōhen)" (Japanese: 不吉な縁結び（後編）)	Tsurumi Mukaiyama	N/A	June 10, 2023
Conan and Ran are invited to Haido Shrine by Kazuha, where they meet Heiji wearing a fox mask. The four of them get caught up in the murder that takes place there. The victim is Hidaka, an investigative police officer, who was looking at flashcards of mugshots of wanted criminals. Believing Hidaka was pursuing wanted criminals at the shrine, Conan and Heiji contact Detective Takagi, who finds three wanted criminals among the shrine visitors. Each criminal has a reason for remaining at the shrine and seems to have been aware of Hidaka's presence...
1087	8	"The Case of Ayumi's Illustrated Diary 3"; Transliteration: "Ayumi no Enikki Jikenbo Surī" (Japanese: 歩美の絵日記事件簿３)	Yasuichirō Yamamoto	Akatsuki Yamatoya	June 17, 2023
While on their way to go shopping, Conan and the Detective Boys hear a man scream. They head towards the sound, which brings them to a tanning salon. Inside the building is salon employee Tsunoda Yasuo, who informs them that there is a dead body in the third room from the back. They head down the dark hallway and find the body of Nishitani Shin inside a tanning machine. He is a bodybuilder with tanning gel rubbed all over his body in order to achieve an even tan. The police arrive, and according to their investigation, the gel was poisoned...
1088	9	"The Unfortunate and Suspicious Victim"; Transliteration: "Fūn de Fushin'na Higaisha" (Japanese: 不運で不審な被害者)	Minoru Tozawa	Nobuo Ōgizawa	June 24, 2023
While passing by Doterasu Shrine in Beika City, the Detective Boys hear a scream and rush to the scene. They find Jupita on the ground, who struck his head after falling down the stone steps. Jupita is taken to the hospital and is likely to survive. Jupita's older sister and rising songwriter Juria and her mentor Saimon meet the Detective Boys at the hospital. Just before being attacked by a mugger, Jupita called Juria to tell her he was in another town. The Detective Boys begin investigating why Jupita lied about coming to Beika City.
1089	10	"The Genius Restaurant"; Transliteration: "Tensai Resutoran" (Japanese: 天才レストラン)	Akira Yoshimura	Yoshio Urasawa	July 8, 2023
Conan and the Detective Boys arrive at a candy shop that's just reopened. A band is playing, and the kids are given plums to celebrate the grand opening. Ayumi, Mitsuhiko, and Genta are fascinated by their first traditional candy, but Conan doesn't seem interested. Genta calls Conan arrogant for acting all grown up. The two get into an argument, and Conan leaves alone. On his way home, an old man jumps out of an alleyway, declares he's seen an omurice corpse, and requests Conan's help...!
1090	11	"The Culprit Who Disappeared Into the Sleeping Town"; Transliteration: "Nemureru Machi ni Kieta Hannin" (Japanese: 眠れる街に消えた犯人)	Yōsuke Fujino	Tatsurō Inamoto	July 15, 2023
While walking down a deserted road after completing a job, Conan, Ran, and Kogoro hear the sound of an alarm whistle and a scream. The sound leads them to security guard Nezu Goro, who has been stabbed in the stomach with a knife. Nezu points towards the main avenue and says the words "white clothes" before he dies. Furthermore, at the top of the stairs Nezu is thought to have fallen down is the crying and screaming Yuki Keiko and the body of her husband Yuki Hideto, the IT company president. Conan heads towards the main avenue in pursuit of the culprit where he encounters a young man dressed in black.
1091	12	"Girls Day Mystery"; Transliteration: "Joshikai Misuterī" (Japanese: 女子会ミステリー)	Tsurumi Mukaiyama	Akatsuki Yamatoya	July 22, 2023
Even as the band rushes around to get ready, the day of their first live performance is upon them. None of them feel ready, but before they know it, it's time to go on. As Tomori stands on the stage, her legs trembling, the crowd grows restless.
1092	13	"Stakeout 2"; Transliteration: "Harikomi Tsū" (Japanese: 張り込み２)	Minoru Tozawa	Nobuo Ōgizawa	July 29, 2023
Conan and the Detective Boys discover Detectives Takagi and Chiba on a stakeout. Believing the children will leave once they realize there's nothing for them to do, they begin explaining the robbery that occurred that morning. The culprit has been identified as unemployed man Fujiki Kazuma, but he hasn't returned home. The police's investigation turned up Fujiki's ex-girlfriend, who he is likely to turn to for help if he's on the run. Though the children are told the culprit has been identified and there's no mystery to solve, something catches Conan's attention...
1093	14	"Akemi Miyano's Time Capsule (Part 1)"; Transliteration: "Miyano Akemi no Taimu Kapuseru (Zenpen)" (Japanese: 宮野明美のタイムカプセル（前編）)	Nobuharu Kamanaka	N/A	August 5, 2023
Conan, Haibara, Ayumi, Genta, and Mitsuhiko visit Teitan Elementary School to take care of the rabbits. The man they encounter there sees Haibara and asks if she's Miyano Akemi's younger sister Shiho. His question frightens Haibara, but he is Teitan Elementary School graduate Murata Sho. His former classmates Yanagimachi Gaku and Ichihashi Seiko join him, and Conan and the Detective Boys learn Akemi attended Teitan Elementary School. The graduates planned to dig up the time capsule they buried when they graduated, but only Akemi knew where it was buried...
1094	15	"Akemi Miyano's Time Capsule (Part 2)"; Transliteration: "Miyano Akemi no Taimu Kapuseru (Kōhen)" (Japanese: 宮野明美のタイムカプセル（前編）)	Nobuharu Kamanaka	N/A	August 12, 2023
While taking care of the rabbits at the animal shed, Conan, Haibara, Ayumi, Genta, and Mitsuhiko meet Teitan Elementary School graduates Murata Sho, Yanagimachi Gaku, and Ichihashi Seiko. They've been asked to dig up a time capsule while the rest of their class prepares for the class reunion. Akemi, the only person who knows the location of the buried time capsule, left behind a code, and the Detective Boys work with the graduates to find clues. But something strange happens during the search, and Conan believes someone may be interfering with their search for the time capsule.
1095	16	"The Missing Man's Dream"; Transliteration: "Kieta Otoko no Yume" (Japanese: 消えた男の夢)	Yōsuke Fujino	Akatsuki Yamatoya	September 2, 2023
Nakajima Takako visits the Mori Detective Agency and explains that her husband is missing. She lost contact with him three days ago, and the police aren't taking her concerns seriously. Conan and Kogoro begin examining the husband's personal effects they received from Takako. Among his belongings are photos from their honeymoon, of her husband diving with his coworker and a ship's captain, and her husband posing with his younger brother in front of their parents' home. They find nothing remarkable on the husband's computer, so they visit his workplace, but...
1096	17	"Mitsuhiko Tsuburaya's Detective Notes 2"; Transliteration: "Tsuburaya Mitsuhiko no Tantei Nōto Tsū" (Japanese: 円谷光彦の探偵ノート２)	Tsurumi Mukaiyama	Chisato Matsuda	September 9, 2023
As Conan, Ayumi, Genta, Mitsuhiko, and Haibara finish helping park warden Kimishima Satoshi, he asks them to find the owner of a lost baseball cap. They follow the clues to the home of Katsumi Nozomu, where they find a police officer patrolling the neighborhood and warning Katsumi about burglaries. When the Detective Boys hear his warning, they decide to investigate the burglaries themselves.
1097	18	"Did I Do It?"; Transliteration: "Watashi ga Yarimashita ka?" (Japanese: 私がやりましたか？)	Minoru Tozawa	Tatsurō Inamoto	September 16, 2023
Sako Manabu, a man with bloody clothes, arrives at the Mori Detective Agency. After a series of unfortunate events, yesterday Sako went out to drown his sorrows, but he can't remember what happened. When he woke up, his glasses were broken and his clothes were covered with blood. He only had a bump on his head, so he realized the blood belonged to someone else. Concerned that he might have done something terrible, he sought help. Though they initially believe there are no clues, Conan finds hints on Sako's body...
1098	19	"Chihaya Hagiwara, Goddess of the Wind (Part 1)"; Transliteration: "Kaze no Megami Hagiwara Chihaya (Zenpen)" (Japanese: 風の女神・萩原千速 （前編）)	Akira Yoshimura	N/A	September 23, 2023
Ran, Kogoro, and Sonoko arrive at a popular restaurant. Conan and Professor Agasa join them inside after showing up late, where they are greeted by Nanjo, president of Suzuki Security, in disguise. He has been receiving threats since he provoked the thieves who stole a safe the other day, and is feeling constrained by the bodyguards assigned to him. Later, Nanjo steps away to visit the restroom. Conan realizes the professor has been in the restroom for a long time, and when he goes to check on him...
1099	20	"Chihaya Hagiwara, Goddess of the Wind (Part 2)"; Transliteration: "Kaze no Megami Hagiwara Chihaya (Kōhen)" (Japanese: 風の女神・萩原千速 （後編）)	Masahiro Takada	Akatsuki Yamatoya	September 30, 2023
Conan, Ran, Kogoro, Sonoko, and the professor visit a popular restaurant. The professor runs into Nanjo, who asks to swap places with him, and he is mistakenly kidnapped by a couple who were planning to kidnap Nanjo. While pursuing the culprits, Conan is rescued by Kanagawa police officer Hagiwara Chihaya. They pursue the yellow getaway vehicle on Chihaya's motorbike, but the detective badge they had been relying on is disposed of. The professor still has in his possession a listening device, and they use the sound heard through it alone to continue their pursuit...
1100	21	"The Troublesome 20 Million Yen"; Transliteration: "Giwaku no Nisenman-en" (Japanese: 疑惑の２０００万円)	Yōsuke Fujino	Akatsuki Yamatoya	October 14, 2023
Conan, Kogoro, and Ran visit the home of client Nemoto Eriko. Three months ago, Eriko lost her husband Nemoto Yutaka in a traffic accident. While going through his things, she found 20 million yen in the back of the closet. Believing it could be dirty money, Eriko hired Kogoro to determine where the money came from. Kogoro considers the possibilities of savings or lottery winnings but eventually begins investigating armed robberies that took place recently. They narrow down the list of possible cases and visit the victims.
1101	22	"Pride of the Immortal Man"; Transliteration: "Fujimi Otoko no Puraido" (Japanese: 不死身男のプライド)	Tsurumi Mukaiyama	Nobuo Ōgizawa	October 21, 2023
Conan and Kogoro discover the body of Tsukuba Corporation president Tsukuba. He died after falling from the roof of a building, and a mysterious message was inside his pocket. When they visit his office to gather information, the employees respond to the message's words "third time's the charm". Tsukuba was attacked twice over the span of several days. Just as the police decide to investigate the death as a successful attack by the culprit, Tsukuba's aunt shows up and says she received a call suggesting it might be a suicide. The police begin investigating the death as both a murder and suicide, but...
1102	23	"The Akabeko and the Three Lucky Men"; Transliteration: "Akabeko to San'nin no Fukuotoko" (Japanese: 赤べこと３人の福男)	Minoru Tozawa	Akatsuki Yamatoya	November 4, 2023
1103	24	"The Teen Novel That Smells Like Guilt"; Transliteration: "Seishun Shōsetsu ni Tsumi no Nioi" (Japanese: 青春小説に罪の匂い)	Masahiro Takada	Hiro Masaki	November 11, 2023
1104	25	"The Real Culprit is on The Run"; Transliteration: "Shinhan'nin wa Tōsō-chū" (Japanese: 真犯人は逃走中)	Yōsuke Fujino	Yūki Nōtsuka	November 18, 2023
1105	26	"Kid vs. Amuro: The Queen's Bangs (Part 1)"; Transliteration: "Kiddo Vāsasu Amuro Kuīnzu Bangu (Zenpen)" (Japanese: キッドＶＳ安室 王妃の前髪(クイーンズ・バング)（前編）)	Nobuharu Kamanaka	N/A	December 2, 2023
1106	27	"Kid vs. Amuro: The Queen's Bangs (Part 2)"; Transliteration: "Kiddo Vāsasu Amuro Kuīnzu Bangu (Kōhen)" (Japanese: キッドＶＳ安室 王妃の前髪(クイーンズ・バング)（後編）)	Nobuharu Kamanaka	N/A	December 9, 2023
1107	28	"I Was Set Up"; Transliteration: "Hamerareta no wa Watashi" (Japanese: ハメられたのは私)	Tsurumi Mukaiyama	Nobuo Ōgizawa	December 16, 2023
1108	29	"The Secret Hidden By the Cards"; Transliteration: "Kādo ni Fusera Reta Himitsu" (Japanese: カードに伏せられた秘密)	Minoru Tozawa	Tatsurō Inamoto	December 23, 2023
1109	30	"Takagi and Date and the Notebook Promise (Part 1)"; Transliteration: "Takagi to Date to Techō no Yakusoku (Zenpen)" (Japanese: 高木と伊達と手帳の約束（前編）)	Akira Yoshimura	N/A	January 6, 2024
1110	31	"Takagi and Date and the Notebook Promise (Part 2)"; Transliteration: "Takagi to Date to Techō no Yakusoku (Kōhen)" (Japanese: 高木と伊達と手帳の約束（後編）)	Masahiro Takada	N/A	January 13, 2024
1111	32	"Rube Goldberg Machine (Part 1)"; Transliteration: "Rūbu Gōrudobāgu Mashin (Zenpen)" (Japanese: ルーブ・ゴールドバーグマシン（前編）)	Yōsuke Fujino	Akatsuki Yamatoya	January 20, 2024
1112	33	"Rube Goldberg Machine (Part 2)"; Transliteration: "Rūbu Gōrudobāgu Mashin (Kōhen)" (Japanese: ルーブ・ゴールドバーグマシン（後編）)	Tsurumi Mukaiyama	Akatsuki Yamatoya	January 27, 2024
1113	34	"Last Dinner for You"; Transliteration: "Rasuto Dinā o Anata ni" (Japanese: ラスト・ディナーをあなたに)	Minoru Tozawa	Hiro Masaki	February 3, 2024
1114	35	"The Holed-Up Sensation"; Transliteration: "O Sawagasena Rōjō" (Japanese: お騒がせな籠城)	Yōsuke Fujino	Nobuo Ōgizawa	February 10, 2024
1115	36	"Chihaya and Jugo's Matchmaking Party (Part 1)"; Transliteration: "Chihaya to Jūgo no Kon Katsu Pātī (Zenpen)" (Japanese: 千速と重悟の婚活パーティー（前編）)	Akira Yoshimura	N/A	March 2, 2024
1116	37	"Chihaya and Jugo's Matchmaking Party (Part 2)"; Transliteration: "Chihaya to Jūgo no Kon Katsu Pātī (Kōhen)" (Japanese: 千速と重悟の婚活パーティー（後編）)	Minoru Tozawa	N/A	March 9, 2024
1117	38	"Karate Teacher, Ran Mouri"; Transliteration: "Karate no Sensei, Mōri Ran" (Japanese: 空手の先生、毛利蘭)	Masahiro Takada	Chisato Matsuda	March 16, 2024
1118	39	"Girls Day Mystery 2"; Transliteration: "Joshikai Misuterī Tsū" (Japanese: 女子会ミステリー２)	Tsurumi Mukaiyama	Akatsuki Yamatoya	March 23, 2024
1119	40	"The Four-Person Class Reunion"; Transliteration: "Yonin Dake no Dōsōkai" (Japanese: ４人だけの同窓会)	Yōsuke Fujino	Yoshio Urasawa	April 6, 2024
1120	41	"Mystery of the Lost Treasure"; Transliteration: "Ushinawareta Otakara Misuterī" (Japanese: 失われたお宝ミステリー)	Nobuharu Kamanaka	Takahiro Ōkura	April 13, 2024
1121	42	"The Dangerous Melon Field"; Transliteration: "Abuna Sugiru Meron Batake" (Japanese: あぶなすぎるメロン畑)	Minoru Tozawa	Akatsuki Yamatoya	April 27, 2024
1122	43	"Stakeout 3"; Transliteration: "Harikomi Surī" (Japanese: 張り込み３)	Masahiro Takada	Tatsurō Inamoto	May 4, 2024
1123	44	"The Body on the Gunma-Nagano Border (Part 1)"; Transliteration: "Gunma to Nagano Bōdā no Itai (Zenpen)" (Japanese: 群馬と長野 県境(ボーダー)の遺体（前編）)	Tsurumi Mukaiyama	N/A	May 11, 2024
1124	45	"The Body on the Gunma-Nagano Border (Part 2)"; Transliteration: "Gunma to Nagano Bōdā no Itai (Kōhen)" (Japanese: 群馬と長野 県境(ボーダー)の遺体（後編）)	Nobuharu Kamanaka	N/A	May 18, 2024
1125	46	"The Case of Ayumi's Illustrated Diary 4"; Transliteration: "Ayumi no Enikki Jikenbo Fō" (Japanese: 歩美の絵日記事件簿４)	Akira Yoshimura	Akatsuki Yamatoya	June 1, 2024
1126	47	"The Detective Who Lost His Mind"; Transliteration: "Nobose Agatta Tantei" (Japanese: 逆上せあがった探偵)	Yōsuke Fujino	Yoshio Urasawa	June 8, 2024
1127	48	"The Interrogation Room 2"; Transliteration: "Za・Torishirabeshitsu Tsū" (Japanese: ザ・取調室２)	Minoru Tozawa	Nobuo Ōgizawa	June 15, 2024
1128	49	"Conan and Megure's Two Hostages (Part 1)"; Transliteration: "Konan to Megure Futari no Hitojichi (Zenpen)" (Japanese: コナンと目暮 ２人の人質（前編）)	Masahiro Takada	Akatsuki Yamatoya	June 22, 2024
1129	50	"Conan and Megure's Two Hostages (Part 2)"; Transliteration: "Konan to Megure Futari no Hitojichi (Kōhen)" (Japanese: コナンと目暮 ２人の人質（後編）)	Tsurumi Mukaiyama	Akatsuki Yamatoya	June 29, 2024
1130	51	"Infidelity Concerns of Triple Collaboration (Part 1)"; Transliteration: "Toripuru Korabo no Uwaki Giwaku (Zenpen)" (Japanese: トリプルコラボの浮気疑惑（前編）)	Ayumi Iemura	N/A	July 20, 2024
1131	52	"Infidelity Concerns of Triple Collaboration (Part 2)"; Transliteration: "Toripuru Korabo no Uwaki Giwaku (Kōhen)" (Japanese: トリプルコラボの浮気疑惑（後編）)	Yōsuke Fujino	N/A	August 3, 2024
1132	53	"Mitsuhiko Tsuburaya's Detective Notes 3"; Transliteration: "Tsuburaya Mitsuhiko no Tantei Nōto Surī" (Japanese: 円谷光彦の探偵ノート３)	Minoru Tozawa	Chisato Matsuda	August 17, 2024
1133	54	"Best Husband"; Transliteration: "Besuto Hazubando" (Japanese: ベストハズバンド)	Masahiro Takada	Tatsurō Inamoto	August 24, 2024
1134	55	"Misfortune of A Positive Man"; Transliteration: "Pojitibu Otoko no Sainan" (Japanese: ポジティブ男の災難)	Yoshitsugu Kimura	Nobuo Ōgizawa	September 14, 2024
1135	56	"Momiji Ooka's Sweet Trap (Part 1)"; Transliteration: "Ōoka Momiji no Amai Wana (Zenpen)" (Japanese: 大岡紅葉の甘い罠（前編）)	Tsurumi Mukaiyama	N/A	September 21, 2024
1136	57	"Momiji Ooka's Sweet Trap (Part 2)"; Transliteration: "Ōoka Momiji no Amai Wana (Kōhen)" (Japanese: 大岡紅葉の甘い罠（後編）)	Ayumi Iemura	N/A	September 28, 2024
1137	58	"The Secret of the Popular Restaurant's Changing Flavor"; Transliteration: "Gyōretsu-ten, Aji hen no Himitsu" (Japanese: 行列店、味変の秘密)	Minoru Tozawa	Tatsurō Inamoto	October 5, 2024
1138	59	"The Moving Police Box"; Transliteration: "Ugoku Kōban" (Japanese: 動く交番)	Yōsuke Fujino	Yasutoshi Murakawa	October 12, 2024
1139	60	"The Sister Troubled By Her Naughty Brother"; Transliteration: "Ijiwaruna Otōto ni Komaru ane" (Japanese: 意地悪な弟に困る姉)	Yūdai Takamoto	Nobuo Ōgizawa	October 19, 2024
1140	61	"Girls Day Mystery 3"; Transliteration: "Joshikai Misuterī Surī" (Japanese: 女子会ミステリー３)	Masahiro Takada	Akatsuki Yamatoya	November 2, 2024
1141	62	"The Mouri Family House Sits"; Transliteration: "Orusuban Mōri Ikka" (Japanese: お留守番毛利一家)	Taiki Nishimura	Nobuo Ōgizawa	November 9, 2024
1142	63	"The Rampo Mansion Murder Case (Part 1)"; Transliteration: "Ranpo-tei Satsujin Jiken (Zenpen)" (Japanese: 乱歩邸殺人事件（前編）)	Tsurumi Mukaiyama	Takahiro Ōkura	November 16, 2024
1143	64	"The Rampo Mansion Murder Case (Part 2)"; Transliteration: "Ranpo-tei Satsujin Jiken (Kōhen)" (Japanese: 乱歩邸殺人事件（後編）)	Minoru Tozawa	Takahiro Ōkura	November 23, 2024
1144	65	"Hotel Serial Bombing Case (Part 1)"; Transliteration: "Hoteru Renzoku Bakuha Jiken (Zenpen)" (Japanese: ホテル連続爆破事件（前編）)	Akira Yoshimura	N/A	December 7, 2024
1145	66	"Hotel Serial Bombing Case (Part 2)"; Transliteration: "Hoteru Renzoku Bakuha Jiken (Kōhen)" (Japanese: ホテル連続爆破事件（後編）)	Ayumi Iemura	N/A	December 14, 2024
1146	67	"The Whistling Bookstore 4"; Transliteration: "Kiteki no Kikoeru Kosho-ten Fō" (Japanese: 汽笛の聞こえる古書店４)	Akira Yoshimura	Yūki Nōtsuka	December 21, 2024
1147	68	"Stakeout 4"; Transliteration: "Harikomi Fō" (Japanese: 張り込み４)	Yōsuke Fujino	Toshimichi Ōkawa	December 28, 2024
1148	69	"The Detective Boys and the Two Leaders (Part 1)"; Transliteration: "Tantei-dan to Futari no Insotsu-sha (Zenpen)" (Japanese: 探偵団と二人の引率者（前編）)	Masahiro Takada	N/A	January 4, 2025
1149	70	"The Detective Boys and the Two Leaders (Part 2)"; Transliteration: "Tantei-dan to Futari no Insotsu-sha (Kōhen)" (Japanese: 探偵団と二人の引率者（後編）)	Tsurumi Mukaiyama	N/A	January 11, 2025
1150	71	"Kaito Kid and the Magic Crown (Part 1)"; Transliteration: "Kaitō Kiddo to Ōkan Majikku (Zenpen)" (Japanese: 怪盗キッドと王冠マジック（前編）)	Minoru Tozawa	N/A	January 18, 2025
1151	72	"Kaito Kid and the Magic Crown (Part 2)"; Transliteration: "Kaitō Kiddo to Ōkan Majikku (Kōhen)" (Japanese: 怪盗キッドと王冠マジック（後編）)	Yoshitsugu Kimura	N/A	January 25, 2025
1152	73	"Last Dance"; Transliteration: "Rasuto Dansu" (Japanese: ラストダンス)	Masahiko Suzuki	Yūki Nōtsuka	February 8, 2025
1153	74	"The Yamahime of Yakushima (Part 1)"; Transliteration: "Yakushima no Yamahime (Zenpen)" (Japanese: 屋久島の山姫（前編）)	Hiroyuki Okuno	Akatsuki Yamatoya	February 15, 2025
1154	75	"The Yamahime of Yakushima (Part 2)"; Transliteration: "Yakushima no Yamahime (Kōhen)" (Japanese: 屋久島の山姫（後編）)	Yūki Kawakata	Akatsuki Yamatoya	February 22, 2025
1155	76	"Follow Them! Detective Taxi 2"; Transliteration: "Tsuiseki! Tantei Takushī Tsū" (Japanese: 追跡！ 探偵タクシー２)	Hiroaki Takagi	Yoshio Urasawa	March 1, 2025
1156	77	"The Ishikawa Yorumasshi Mystery (Part 1)"; Transliteration: "Ishikawa Yorumasshi Misuterī (Zenpen)" (Japanese: 石川よるまっしミステリー（前編）)	Akira Yoshimura	Toshimichi Ōkawa	March 8, 2025
1157	78	"The Ishikawa Yorumasshi Mystery (Part 2)"; Transliteration: "Ishikawa Yorumasshi Misuterī (Kōhen)" (Japanese: 石川よるまっしミステリー（後編）)	Masahiro Takada	Toshimichi Ōkawa	March 15, 2025
1158	79	"The Detective Boys and Their Beloved Old House"; Transliteration: "Tantei-dan to Akogareno ko Minka" (Japanese: 探偵団と憧れの古民家)	Taiki Nishimura	Chisato Matsuda	April 12, 2025
1159	80	"The Whereabouts of the Goodbye"; Transliteration: "Sayonara no Yukue" (Japanese: サヨナラの行方)	Tsurumi Mukaiyama	Nobuo Ōgizawa	April 19, 2025
1160	81	"When the Shishi-odoshi Resonates"; Transliteration: "Shishi-odoshi ga Hibiku Toki" (Japanese: 鹿威しが響く刻)	Yūki Kawakata	Akatsuki Yamatoya	April 26, 2025
1161	82	"The Secret's Afterimage"; Transliteration: "Himitsu no Zanzō" (Japanese: 秘密の残像)	Minoru Tozawa	Takeharu Sakurai	May 3, 2025
1162	83	"The Case of Ayumi's Illustrated Diary 5"; Transliteration: "Ayumi no Enikki Jikenbo Faibu" (Japanese: 歩美の絵日記事件簿５)	Akira Yoshimura	Akatsuki Yamatoya	May 10, 2025
1163	84	"The Counting Song Heard in the Dark"; Transliteration: "Yami ni Kikoeru Kazoeuta" (Japanese: 闇に聞こえる数え歌)	Minoru Tozawa	Yasutoshi Murakawa	May 17, 2025
1164	85	"The 17-Year-Old Truth (The Bloody Knight)"; Transliteration: "Jūnana-nen Mae no Shinsō Chizome no Naito" (Japanese: 17年前の真相 血染めの騎士(ナイト))	Masahiro Takada	N/A	June 7, 2025
1165	86	"The 17-Year-Old Truth (The Perceptive Devil)"; Transliteration: "Jūnana-nen Mae no Shinsō-tachi me no Akuma" (Japanese: 17年前の真相 達眼の悪魔)	Ayumi Iemura	N/A	June 14, 2025
1166	87	"The 17-Year-Old Truth (The Watchtower Bishop)"; Transliteration: "Jūnana-nen Mae no Shinsō Tōminokaku Gyō" (Japanese: 17年前の真相 遠見の角行)	Nobuharu Kamanaka	N/A	June 21, 2025
1167	88	"The 17-Year-Old Truth (The Queen's Gambit)"; Transliteration: "Jūnana-nen Mae no Shinsō Kuīnzu Gyanbitto" (Japanese: 17年前の真相 女王の謀(クイーンズ・ギャンビット))	Minoru Tozawa	N/A	June 28, 2025
1168	89	"Genta's Eel Casebook"; Transliteration: "Genta no Unagi Torimonochō" (Japanese: 元太のうなぎ捕物帳)	Tsurumi Mukaiyama	Yūki Nōtsuka	July 19, 2025
1169	90	"The Mystery of the Man-Eating Classroom (Part 1)"; Transliteration: "Hitokui Kyōshitsu no Kai (Zenpen)" (Japanese: 人喰い教室の怪 （前編）)	Yūki Kawakata	N/A	July 26, 2025
1170	91	"The Mystery of the Man-Eating Classroom (Part 2)"; Transliteration: "Hitokui Kyōshitsu no Kai (Kōhen)" (Japanese: 人喰い教室の怪 （後編）)	Masahiro Takada	N/A	August 2, 2025
1171	92	"Why I Became Her Butler (Part 1)"; Transliteration: "Shitsuji ni Natta Riyū (Zenpen)" (Japanese: 執事になった理由 （前編）)	Akira Yoshimura	N/A	August 16, 2025
1172	93	"Why I Became Her Butler (Part 2)"; Transliteration: "Shitsuji ni Natta Riyū (Kōhen)" (Japanese: 執事になった理由 （後編）)	Hiroaki Takagi	N/A	August 23, 2025
1173	94	"It's a Ghost!"; Transliteration: "Obake ga Deta!" (Japanese: オバケが出た！)	Minoru Tozawa	Chisato Matsuda	August 30, 2025
1174	95	"The Glassy Water's Surface (Part 1)"; Transliteration: "Garasu no Minamo (Zenpen)" (Japanese: ガラスの水面（前編）)	Masahiko Suzuki	Akatsuki Yamatoya	September 6, 2025
1175	96	"The Glassy Water's Surface (Part 2)"; Transliteration: "Garasu no Minamo (Kōhen)" (Japanese: ガラスの水面（後編）)	Yoshihiro Sugai	Akatsuki Yamatoya	September 13, 2025
1176	97	"The Hero of Ishinomaki"; Transliteration: "Ishinomaki no Hīrō" (Japanese: 石巻のヒーロー)	Masahiro Takada Yoshitsugu Kimura	Jun'ichi Miyashita	September 20, 2025
1177	98	"Search for the Phantom Giant"; Transliteration: "Maboroshi no Ōotoko o Sagase" (Japanese: 幻の大男を探せ)	Ryōtarō Aoba	Chisato Matsuda	September 27, 2025
1178	99	"The Crimson Skull of Mt. Washio (Part 1)"; Transliteration: "Washio-san no Guren Dokuro (Zenpen)" (Japanese: 鷲雄山の紅蓮髑髏（前編）)	Ayumi Iemura	N/A	October 11, 2025
1179	100	"The Crimson Skull of Mt. Washio (Part 2)"; Transliteration: "Washio-san no Guren Dokuro (Kōhen)" (Japanese: 鷲雄山の紅蓮髑髏（後編）)	Minoru Tozawa	N/A	October 18, 2025
1180	101	"The Lucky Cat Saw Everything"; Transliteration: "Manekineko wa Mite ita" (Japanese: 招き猫は見ていた)	Mao Yingxing	Hiro Masaki	November 1, 2025
1181	102	"Buchi Returns a Favor"; Transliteration: "Buchi no Ongaeshi" (Japanese: ブチの恩返し)	Yūki Kawakata	Nobuo Ōgizawa	November 8, 2025
1182	103	"Arrest That Face"; Transliteration: "Sono Kao o Tsukamaero" (Japanese: その顔を捕まえろ)	Yoshihiro Sugai	Tatsurō Inamoto	November 15, 2025
1183	104	"The Interrogation Room 3"; Transliteration: "Za・Torishirabeshitsu Surī" (Japanese: ザ・取調室３)	Kōta Nakamura	Toshimichi Ōkawa	November 29, 2025
1184	105	"The Red-Brick Warehouse and the Vanishing Kidnapper (Part 1)"; Transliteration: "Akarenga Sōko Kieta Yūkai-han (Zenpen)" (Japanese: 赤レンガ倉庫 消えた誘拐犯（前編）)	Masahiro Takada	N/A	December 6, 2025
1185	106	"The Red-Brick Warehouse and the Vanishing Kidnapper (Part 2)"; Transliteration: "Akarenga Sōko Kieta Yūkai-han (Kōhen)" (Japanese: 赤レンガ倉庫 消えた誘拐犯（後編）)	Ayumi Iemura	N/A	December 13, 2025
1186	107	"Girls Day Mystery 4"; Transliteration: "Joshikai Misuterī Fō" (Japanese: 女子会ミステリー4)	Minoru Tozawa	Akatsuki Yamatoya	December 27, 2025
1187	108	"Episode "ZERO" Kudo Shinichi and the Aquarium Case"; Transliteration: "Episōdo "Zero" Kudō Shin'ichi Suizokukan Jiken" (Japanese: エピソード“ZERO”工藤新一水族館事件)	Yasuichirō Yamamoto	N/A	January 3, 2026
1188	109	"Follow Them! Detective Taxi 3"; Transliteration: "Tsuiseki! Tantei Takushī Surī" (Japanese: 追跡！ 探偵タクシー3)	Hiroaki Takagi	Yoshio Urasawa	January 10, 2026
1189	110	"Double Alibi"; Transliteration: "Daburu・Aribai" (Japanese: W・アリバイ)	Yoshihiro Sugai	Asami Ishikawa	January 17, 2026
1190	111	"The Lover Who Vanished on Pont Koitani (Tottori Tour)"; Transliteration: "Koidanibashi ni Kieta Koibito (Tottori Shūyū-hen)" (Japanese: 恋谷橋に消えた恋人 (鳥取周遊編))	Yūki Kawakata	Kōshirō Mikami	January 24, 2026
1191	112	"The Lover Who Vanished on Pont Koitani (Misasa Arc)"; Transliteration: "Koidanibashi ni Kieta Koibito (Misasa-hen)" (Japanese: 恋谷橋に消えた恋人 (三朝編))	Masahiro Takada	Kōshirō Mikami	January 31, 2026
1192	113	"Mitsuhiko Tsuburaya's Detective Notes 4"; Transliteration: "Tsuburaya Mitsuhiko no Tantei Nōto Fō" (Japanese: 円谷光彦の探偵ノート４)	Hiroyuki Okuno	Chisato Matsuda	March 7, 2026
1193	114	"Kid vs. Hakuba: The Azure Throne (Part 1)"; Transliteration: "Kiddo Vāsasu Hakuba Azūru Surōn (Zenpen)" (Japanese: キッドVS白馬 青の玉座(アズール・スローン)（前編）)	Kōta Nakamura	N/A	March 14, 2026
1194	115	"Kid vs. Hakuba: The Azure Throne (Part 2)"; Transliteration: "Kiddo Vāsasu Hakuba Azūru Surōn (Kōhen)" (Japanese: キッドVS白馬 青の玉座(アズール・スローン)（後編）)	Minoru Tozawa	N/A	March 21, 2026
1195	116	"The Spiral Mansion Mystery (Part 1)"; Transliteration: "Yakata Nisuterī Uzumaki-kan (Zenpen)" (Japanese: 館ミステリー 渦巻館（前編）)	Yūki Kawakata	Hiro Masaki	March 28, 2026
1196	117	"The Spiral Mansion Mystery (Part 2)"; Transliteration: "Yakata Nisuterī Uzumaki-kan (Kōhen)" (Japanese: 館ミステリー 渦巻館（後編）)	Yoshihiro Sugai	Hiro Masaki	April 4, 2026
1197	118	"The Cosplay Rider of the Wind"; Transliteration: "Senpū no Kosupureraidā" (Japanese: 旋風のコスプレライダー)	Masahiro Takada	Takahiro Ōkura	April 11, 2026
1198	119	"Cinderella's Shoe"; Transliteration: "Shinderera no Kutsu" (Japanese: シンデレラの靴)	Minoru Tozawa	Tatsurō Inamoto	April 18, 2026
1199	120	"The Detective Boys VS the Silver Detectives 2"; Transliteration: "Shōnen Tanteidan Vāsasu Shirubā Tanteidan Tsū" (Japanese: 少年探偵団VS老人(シルバー)探偵団２)	Kōta Nakamura	Nobuo Ōgizawa	April 25, 2026
1200	121	"The Porch Pirate Epidemic"; Transliteration: "Okihai Dorobō Tahatsuchū" (Japanese: 置き配泥棒多発中)	Yūki Kawakata	Yūki Nōtsuka	May 2, 2026
1201	122	"I'm the Culprit"; Transliteration: "Watashi ga Hannin Desu" (Japanese: 私が犯人です)	Yoshihiro Sugai	Akatsuki Yamatoya	May 9, 2026
1202	123	"I Cannot Lie to Archery"; Transliteration: "Ācherī ni uso wa Tsukenai" (Japanese: アーチェリーに嘘はつけない)	Masahiro Takada	Yoshio Urasawa	May 30, 2026
SP (Note: Despite this episode being introduced in the international numbering (mainly has to do with copyright-fee settlements), in Japan locally, however, this episode was skipped and is therefore regarded as a special.)	124	"The Gold-Star Answer"; Transliteration: "Hanamaru na Ansā" (Japanese: はなまるな真実(アンサー))	Hiroaki Takagi Minoru Tozawa	Akatsuki Yamatoya	June 6, 2026
Note: Second part of a crossover with Toei Animation's Star Detective Precure!.
1203	125	"Sonoko and Conan's Spooky Story Night"; Transliteration: "Sonoko to Konan no Kaidan Naito" (Japanese: 園子とコナンの怪談ナイト)	Akira Mano	Tatsurō Inamoto	June 13, 2026
1204	126	"Who Kidnapped Conan and Azusa? (Part 1)"; Transliteration: "Konan to Azusa Yūkai Shita no wa Dare? (Zenpen)" (Japanese: コナンと梓 誘拐したのは誰？（前編）)	Minoru Tozawa	N/A	June 20, 2026
1205	127	"Who Kidnapped Conan and Azusa? (Part 2)"; Transliteration: "Konan to Azusa Yūkai Shita no wa Dare? (Kōhen)" (Japanese: コナンと梓 誘拐したのは誰？（後編）)	Yoshihiro Sugai	N/A	June 27, 2026
1206	128	"The Man Who Came Falling Down"; Transliteration: "Korogeochite Kita Otoko" (Japanese: 転げ落ちてきた男)	Yūichi Nobe	Nobuo Ōgizawa	July 11, 2026
1207	129	"The J.League Starting Whistle"; Transliteration: "J Rīgu Kaimaku no Hoissuru" (Japanese: Jリーグ開幕の警笛)	Akira Yoshimura Masahiro Takada	Toshimichi Ōkawa	July 18, 2026
1208	130	"Welcome to the Stone Age Village"; Transliteration: "Oide yo Sekkijin no Sato" (Japanese: おいでよ石器人の里)	Yūki Kawakata	Hiro Masaki	July 25, 2026
1209	131	"Who's the Target?"; Transliteration: "Nerawa Reta no wa Dare?" (Japanese: 狙われたのは誰？)	Chihiro Wada	Tatsurō Inamoto	August 1, 2026
1210	132	"The Cursed Neighbor's House"; Transliteration: "Noroi no Rinka" (Japanese: 呪いの隣家)	Daiki Koyama	Nobuo Ōgizawa	August 22, 2026
1211	133	"Birdman Contest Bombing Case (Part 1)"; Transliteration: "Tori Ningen Kontesuto Bakuha Jiken (Zenpen)" (Japanese: 鳥人間コンテスト爆破事件（前編）)	Yoshihiro Sugai Tsukasa Saitō	Takahiro Ōkura	August 29, 2026
1212	134	"Birdman Contest Bombing Case (Part 2)"; Transliteration: "Tori Ningen Kontesuto Bakuha Jiken (Kōhen)" (Japanese: 鳥人間コンテスト爆破事件（後編）)	Masahiro Takada	Takahiro Ōkura	September 5, 2026
1213	135	"Ran Mouri, The Eyewitness"; Transliteration: "Mokugeki-sha, Moriran" (Japanese: 目撃者、毛利蘭)	Yūki Kawakata	Chisato Matsuda	September 19, 2026
1214	136	"The Crimson Closing Day (Opening Day)"; Transliteration: "Akaneiro no Senshūraku (Shonichi)" (Japanese: 茜色の千秋楽（初日))	Yoshitsugu Kimura	Hiroaki Takagi	September 26, 2026
1215	137	"The Crimson Closing Day (The Penultimate Show)"; Transliteration: "Akaneiro no Senshūraku (Maeraku)" (Japanese: 茜色の千秋楽（前楽))	Minoru Tozawa	Hiroaki Takagi	October 3, 2026
1216	138	"The Crimson Closing Day (The Final Show)"; Transliteration: "Akaneiro no Senshūraku (Ōraku)" (Japanese: 茜色の千秋楽（大楽))	Hiroaki Takagi	Hiroaki Takagi	October 10, 2026
1217	139	"The Hands Pushing Their Back"; Transliteration: "Senaka o Osu te" (Japanese: 背中を押す手)	Yoshihiro Sugai Tsukasa Saitō	Tatsurō Inamoto	October 17, 2026
1218	140	"A Paw-sitively Wonderful Investigation"; Transliteration: "Wandafuru na Sōsa" (Japanese: わんだふるな捜査)	Masahiro Takada	Hiro Masaki	October 31, 2026
1219	141	"The Café of Many Refusals"; Transliteration: "Okotowari no ōi Kissaten" (Japanese: お断りの多い喫茶店)	Chihiro Wada	Nobuo Ōgizawa	November 7, 2026
1220	142	"Girls Day Mystery 5 (Part 1)"; Transliteration: "Onagokai Misuterī Faibu (Zenpen)" (Japanese: 女子会ミステリー５（前編）)	Kōta Nakamura	Akatsuki Yamatoya	November 14, 2026
1221	143	"Girls Day Mystery 5 (Part 2)"; Transliteration: "Onagokai Misuterī Faibu (Kōhen)" (Japanese: 女子会ミステリー５（後編）)	Minoru Tozawa	Akatsuki Yamatoya	November 21, 2026
